= Perris Block =

Geological unit in California, US

Coordinates: 33°51′9″N 117°15′19″W

The Perris Block is the central block of three major fault-bounded blocks of the northern part of the Peninsular Ranges. The Perris Block lies between the Santa Ana Block to the west and the San Jacinto Block to the east. The Perris Block was named by Walter A. English in 1925 for the city of Perris, located near the center of the block.

Structurally stable for millions of years, the Perris Block is an internally unfaulted, eroded mass of Cretaceous and older granitic rocks of the Southern California Batholith and metasedimentary basement rocks. These rocks compose various ranges of mountains and hills and monadnocks and underlie the valleys within it. It is bounded on the west by the Chino Fault and Elsinore Trough, on the east and northeast by the San Jacinto Fault Zone including the San Jacinto Valley graben. It is bounded on the north by the Cucamonga Fault Zone, in the San Bernardino Valley and San Jose Hills Fault in the Pomona Valley. To the south, the Perris Block is bounded by the San Felipe Fault Zone between it and the Temecula, Aguanga, and Anza sedimentary basins that lie between Temecula and Anza. The interior of the Perris Block has various low bedrock mountains, hills and bedrock plains with intervening sediment-filled valleys, that make up six erosional surfaces sculpted by the effects of the vertical oscillation of the block during the Plio – Pleistocene era.

== Northern Perris Block ==
The northern part of the Perris Block lies north of the Santa Ana River. Here in the Pomona Valley and San Bernardino Valley it has been mostly buried by the sediments from the Transverse Ranges as they rose over the last 2-3 million years. Exceptions are the Jurupa Mountains and Pedley Hills that still rise above that deposition. The now obliterated Slover Mountain also did so before it was mined out of existence. These sediments under the Pomona and San Bernardino Valleys form the Inland Santa Ana Basin aquifer.

East of the Santa Ana River lie the La Loma Hills, Box Springs Mountains and northeastward of them, across the canyon of Spring Brook and of the Pigeon Pass Valley, the range of mountains formed by Blue Mountain, Reche Summit, Olive Hill and the Kalmia Hills that border the northeast edge of the Perris Block along the San Jacinto Fault Zone to the Perris Plain.

== Central Perris Block ==
The western side of the central Perris Block and across its width eastward south of the Santa Ana River, is bordered by the range of the Temescal Mountains. They run southeastward along the Elsinore Trough to the Temecula Basin. Eastward, these mountains run to the south of the Santa Ana River to Sycamore Canyon, bordering on the Box Springs Mountains. They enclose the Gavilan Plateau and partially enclose the Riverside Valley on the west, south and east. They extend their ancient eroded surfaces eastward to the Perris Plain and the Plains of Leon, which they border on the west, southward to the Temecula Basin.

=== Perris Plain ===
The Perris Plain, an uplifted peneplain, is drained primarily in the San Jacinto Basin, the San Jacinto River watershed flowing into Lake Elsinore, that is dotted by monadnocks and by several other ranges of mountains and hills. Above the San Jacinto Basin, the northwest corner of the Perris Plain is drained by Sycamore Canyon and Tequesquito Arroyo into the Santa Ana River. Below the San Jacinto Basin, the Perris Plain is bounded on the south by the Plains of Leon, which continues the plains of the Perris Block and by the mountains of the southern Perris Block.

Plains and Valleys of the Perris Block within the San Jacinto Basin:

- Perris Plain
  - Menifee Valley
  - Moreno Valley
  - Paloma Valley
  - Perris Valley
  - San Jacinto Valley
  - Eastern Diamond Valley

Mountains and hills of the Perris Block within the San Jacinto Basin include:

- Bell Mountain
- Bernasconi Hills
  - Mount Russell
- Domenigoni Mountains
  - Searls Ridge
- Double Butte
- Hemet Butte
- Hules Hill
- Kalmia Hills
- Lakeview Mountains
- Tres Cerritos

== Southern Perris Block ==
The Perris Block south of the Perris Plain and San Jacinto Basin is characterized by the extension of the Perris Plain, the Plains of Leon that includes within it the Domenigoni Valley and western Diamond Valley, the upper part of the valley of Warm Springs Creek and connecting tablelands, French Valley, Auld Valley and Buck Mesa. The southern Perris Block also includes the hills and mountains to the east and south of the Perris Plain, that with the Plains of Leon are all drained by the creeks tributary to the Santa Margarita River into the Temecula Basin.

Tucalota Creek, drains the Rawson Mountains (south of Diamond and Domenigoni Valleys), Black Mountain, the western slopes of Red Mountain, the Magee Hills, the Tucalota Hills and Bachelor Mountain into Lake Skinner then to Santa Gertrudis Creek, a tributary of Murrieta Creek. The west slope of the southern Magee Hills, and the north slope of the Black Hills are drained by Santa Gertrudis Creek or its tributaries, another Murrieta Creek tributary. Billy Goat Mountain, Oak Mountain, Round Top the west and south slopes of the Black Hills are drained by Temecula Creek or its tributaries, as are the south slopes of Red Mountain, Little Cahuilla Mountain and Cahuilla Mountain.
