= Plains of Leon =

Coordinates: 33°37′36″N 117°8′3″W

The Plains of Leon are named for the former gold mining town of Leon, once located near the middle of the plain. It is a plain in the Perris Block, contiguous on the south with the Perris Plain, including within it the Domenigoni Valley and western Diamond Valley, French Valley, Auld Valley, the upper part of the valley of Warm Springs Creek and connecting tablelands.

The Plains of Leon are bounded on the west by the Paloma Valley, the southeastern Temescal Mountains, and the valley of Warm Springs Creek after it drops below the level of the tablelands of the plains. It is bounded on the north by Menifee Valley and the Domenigoni Mountains, and it extends southward to include French Valley, Auld Valley, and the tablelands between them. It is bounded on the south by Tucalota Creek (originally Alamos Creek) and the level land west of it to Warm Springs Creek and northeast of Murrieta Hot Springs. To the east, it was originally bounded by the eastern Diamond Valley, Rawson Mountains, Bachelor Mountain, Black Mountain, and Tucalota Hills. However, now Diamond Valley is bounded on the east by the West Dam of the Diamond Valley Lake. Auld Valley is now bounded to the east by Skinner Reservoir south of Bachelor Mountain on Tucalota Creek.

Unlike the Perris Plain, which lies within the watershed of the San Jacinto River, the Plains of Leon are drained by Warm Springs Creek, French Valley Creek and Tucalota Creek, tributaries of Murrieta Creek and its parent, the Santa Margarita River.
