= Warm Springs Creek (California) =

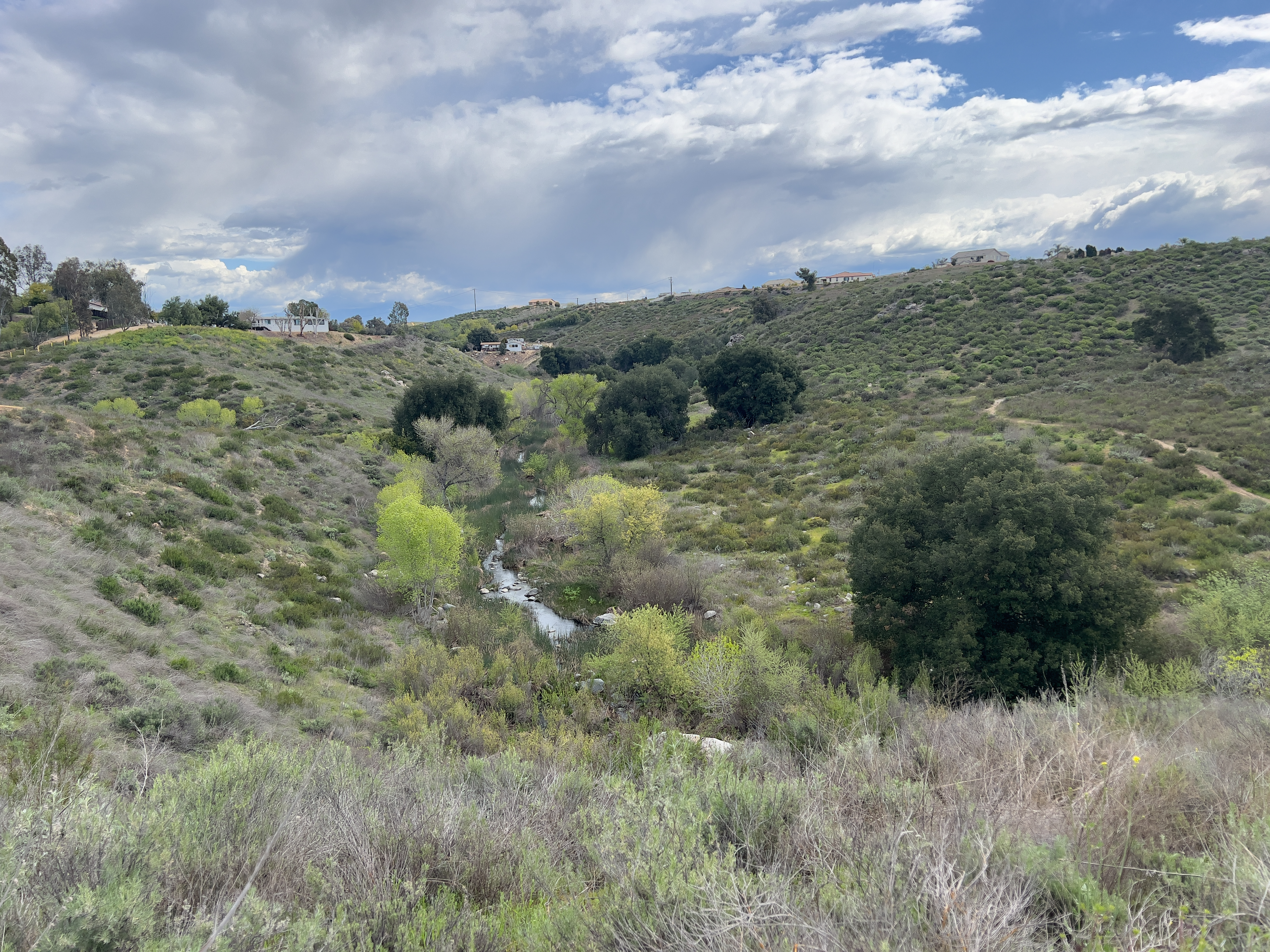
- Warm Springs Creek in Warm Springs Park and Preserve, Murrieta, California

- Location of the mouth within California

Location
- Country: United States
- State: California
- Region: Riverside County

Physical characteristics
- Source: formerly in Diamond Valley, now in Domenigoni Valley, west of Diamond Valley Lake
  - coordinates: 33°35′39″N 117°19′05″W
  - elevation: 1,460 ft (450 m)
- Mouth: confluence with Murrieta Creek, tributary of the Santa Margarita River
  - coordinates: 33°31′37″N 117°11′07″W
  - elevation: 1,033 ft (315 m)
- Length: 18 mi (29 km)
- Discharge
  - location: confluence with Murrieta Creek

Basin features
- Tributaries
  - left: unnamed arroyo from French Valley

Warm Springs Creek is a stream or arroyo, and a tributary of Murrieta Creek, in Riverside County, Southern California.

== Geography ==
The source of Warm Springs Creek was formerly at an altitude of 1,580 feet (480 m) in Diamond Valley, but is now under Diamond Valley Lake at 33°40′31″N 117°04′03″W. The source is now at an altitude of 1,460 feet (450 m) in Domenigoni Valley, west of Diamond Valley Lake and its West Dam.

Warm Springs Creek descends southwest through Domenigoni Valley for 3 miles (4.8 km), past the site of the former mining settlement of Leon, and runs near the intersection of Leon Road and Scott Road. There, at 1,400 feet (430 m), it descends into a canyon running south-southwest, passing east of the Murrieta Hogbacks, where an unnamed arroyo that drains French Valley to the northeast joins Warm Springs Creek. It continues past the community of Murrieta Hot Springs (a former census-designated place that is now part of the city of Murrieta) on its east bank, running under Murrieta Hot Springs Road. After it passes under Interstate 15, it reaches its confluence with Murrieta Creek in southwestern Murrieta, within the Temecula Valley, at an elevation of 1,033 feet (315 m).

== See also ==
- Plains of Leon
