= Rawson Mountains (California) =

Mountain range in California, United States

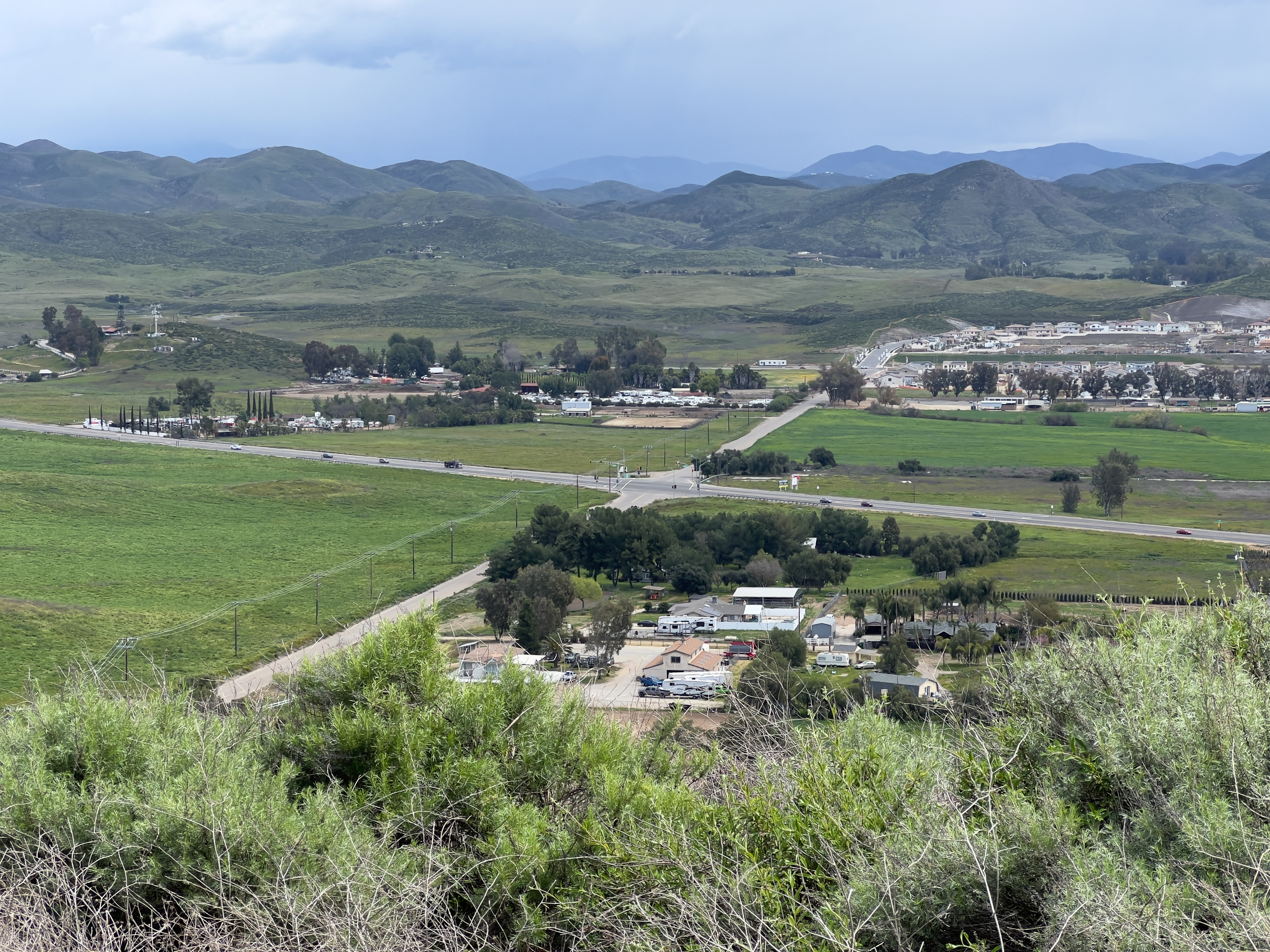
- Rawson Mountains near French Valley, California

Highest point
- Elevation: 814.3 m (2,672 ft)

Geography
- Location within California
- Country: United States
- State: California
- District: Riverside County
- Range coordinates: 33°40′01″N 117°01′19″W
- Topo map: USGS Winchester

The Rawson Mountains are a mountain range in Riverside County, California. The Rawson Mountains are located south of the Diamond Valley Lake, southeast of Domenigoni Valley, east of French Valley, west of Goodhart Canyon and north of Bachelor Mountain, Auld Valley (above Lake Skinner) and Black Mountain. The Rawson Mountains are composed primarily of metamorphic rock of the Triassic - Jurassic French Valley formation, formed as a roof pendant of the Peninsular Range Batholith. The extreme western end of the range and various intrusions within it are Cretaceous granitic rock.

Crown Valley in the midst of the range is drained to the south by Rawson Canyon Creek into Tucalota Creek before it enters Lake Skinner. Its western and northern slopes drain into Warm Springs Creek watershed of the Santa Margarita River, or the reservoir. To the northeast the drainage is into the eastern Diamond Valley and the San Jacinto River.
