= Rawson Mountains =

Rawson Mountains may refer to:

- Rawson Mountains (California)
- Rawson Mountains (Antarctica)
