= San Jacinto Valley =

Valley in Riverside County, California

Coordinates: 33°47′52″N 117°0′19″W

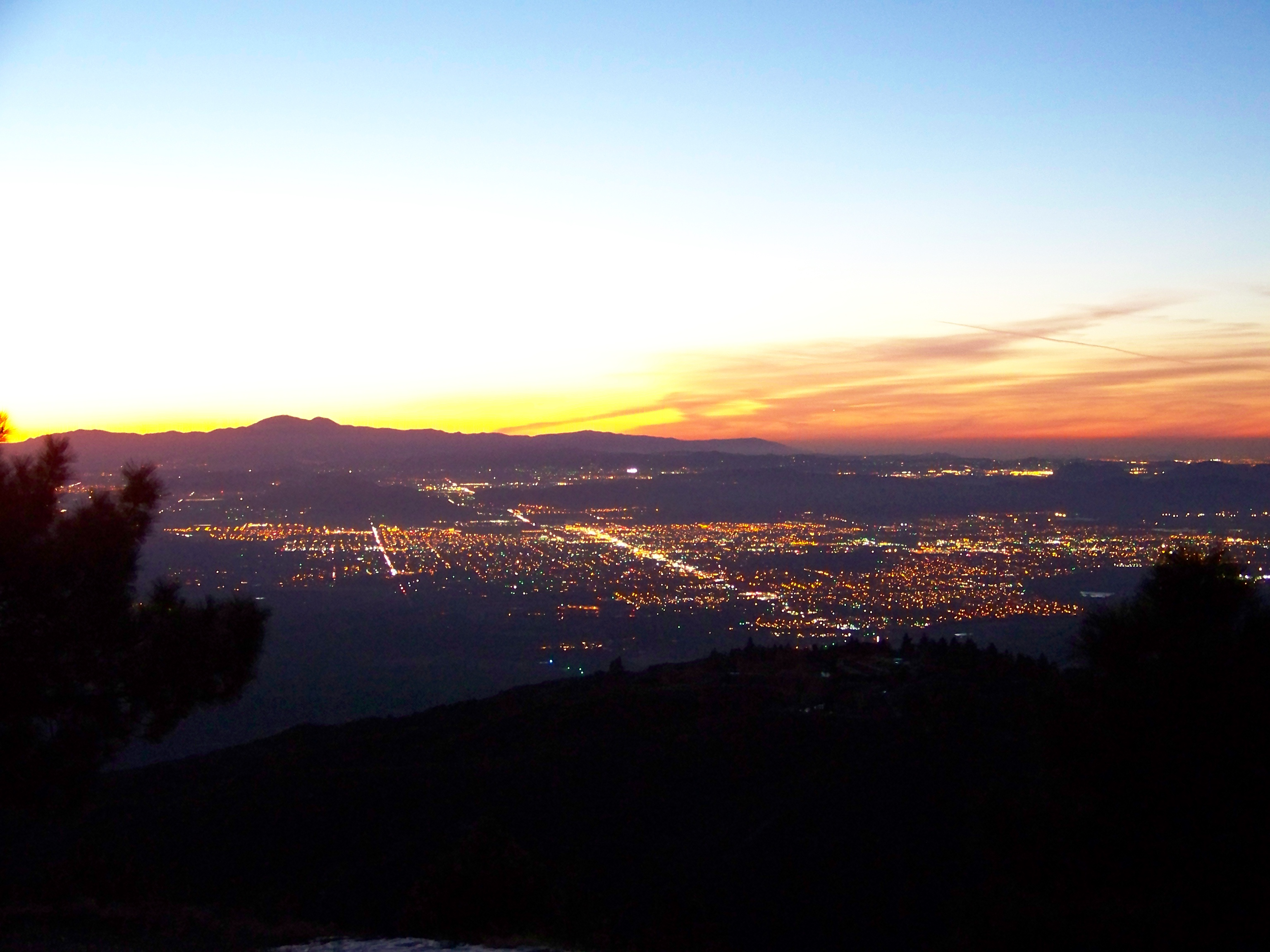
The city of Hemet as seen from the San Jacinto Mountains. The bright streets in the middle and left sides are Florida Avenue And Stetson Avenue, respectively.

The San Jacinto Valley is a valley located in Riverside County, in Southern California, in the Inland Empire. The valley is located at the base of the San Jacinto Mountains in the east and Santa Rosa Hills to the south with the San Gorgonio Pass to the north. The average elevation is 1,500 feet (460 m), with the highest points in the foothills south of Hemet and the western slopes of the San Jacinto Mountains. It is home to two cities, Hemet and San Jacinto, and several unincorporated communities. According to the 2020 census, the valley has a combined population of over 190,000 residents, including more than 143,000 residents within the city limits of Hemet and San Jacinto. The valley is also where the story and play "Ramona" was set; the story was written after author Helen Hunt Jackson visited the valley in the 1880s. The valley is also known for being an area of agriculture, which has given way to more urbanized development.

== History ==
The first native people settled in the San Jacinto Valley thousands of years ago. Later, the Serrano and Cahuilla people arrived, whose villages were located along and near streams and springs. They were hunters and gatherers and they subsisted primarily on small game and acorns. The Soboba Indian Reservation, just east of San Jacinto, is now the home to the descendants of some of these people. The first Spanish explorers entered the San Jacinto Valley in the early 1770s. In 1774, and again in 1775, Colonel Juan Bautista de Anza led two expeditions up from Mexico, crossing the Colorado River at Yuma and continuing across the Borrego Desert and up Coyote Canyon. For a few years, the Valley was on the main overland route to California. In the early 19th century, the area became a cattle ranch for the Spanish Mission San Luis Rey, which is located in the modern-day city of Oceanside. The area was known as Rancho San Jacinto. When the missions were broken up by the Mexican government, the land was given to José Antonio Estudillo in 1842. This land grant eventually became the towns of San Jacinto and Hemet.

== Cities ==
There are two incorporated cities in the San Jacinto Valley, Hemet and San Jacinto. The two cities in the valley have experienced significant growth since the 1980s, and make up one of the fastest-growing areas in the state of California and Riverside County.

=== Hemet ===
Hemet has an area of about 29.3 square miles (76 km^{2}), and a population of 89,833 as of the 2020 census. Hemet was founded in 1887 and was incorporated on January 20, 1910. The city is home to the Ramona Bowl which is where "Ramona", the official outdoor play of California, is performed. Hemet is located at the southern end of the valley. The city is home to the Western Science Center, and Diamond Valley Lake. This city was also named a Tree City USA by the National Arbor Day Foundation, and is home to the only hospital in the valley.

=== San Jacinto ===
The "S" on the mountains just north of San Jacinto

San Jacinto has an area of 26.1 square miles (68 km^{2}), most of it land. The population was 53,898 according to the 2020 census. It was named after Saint Hyacinth and is located at the north end of the valley. The city was founded in 1870, and was incorporated on April 9, 1888, making it one of the oldest cities in the county. The city is also home to Mt. San Jacinto College, a community college which has served the valley and the Inland Empire since 1965. The city is also planned to be the location of the eastern terminus of Mid County Parkway, a new transportation corridor in that will link to I-215 in Perris.

== Unincorporated areas ==
=== East Hemet ===
East Hemet is an unincorporated area just east of Hemet. Its population was 19,432 in the 2020 census. It contains an area of 3.2 square miles (8.3 km^{2}) of land. It is located in between Hemet and Valle Vista.

=== Gilman Hot Springs ===
Gilman Hot Springs, California was once a favorite vacation spot called Gilman Hot Springs. It is now home to the Church of Scientology headquarters and Golden Era Productions.

=== Green Acres ===
Green Acres, located 6 miles (9.7 km) west of Hemet, had a population of 2,918 according to the 2020 census. It was once home to Dan Blocker from the TV show Bonanza.

=== Homeland ===
Homeland is a census-designated place located approximately 8 miles (13 km) west of Hemet, California. It had a population of 6,772 as of the 2020 census.

=== Soboba ===
Soboba Hot Springs was the vacation ground in the 1900s for many Hollywood movie stars.

=== Valle Vista ===
Valle Vista is an unincorporated area east of Hemet that extends south to Bautista Canyon and to the east to the base of the San Jacinto Mountains. Valle Vista has an area of 3.4 square miles (8.8 km^{2}), of which 3.2 square miles (8.3 km^{2}) is land. The population at the 2020 census was 16,194, up from 11,036 at the 2010 census. Fairview Avenue, which runs from Bautista Canyon to the city of San Jacinto, is part of the old historic Juan Bautista de Anza National Historic Trail, an old trail that went from Nogales, Arizona on the U.S. and Mexican Border, to a Presidio in San Francisco. This was one of the first overland routes to California. The area will possibly be annexed by Hemet in the near future according to the proposed land use map on the City of Hemet's general plan website, but since the general plan is still under draft, this may not necessarily happen.

=== Winchester ===
Winchester is a census-designated place (CDP) located 9 miles (14 km) west-southwest of Hemet. As of the 2020 census, the CDP had a total population of 3,068, up from 2,534 at the 2010 census. Winchester is mostly rural and contains many ranches and several local businesses, and it was once home to the Winchester Cheese Company.

== Education ==
=== School districts ===
==== Hemet Unified School District ====
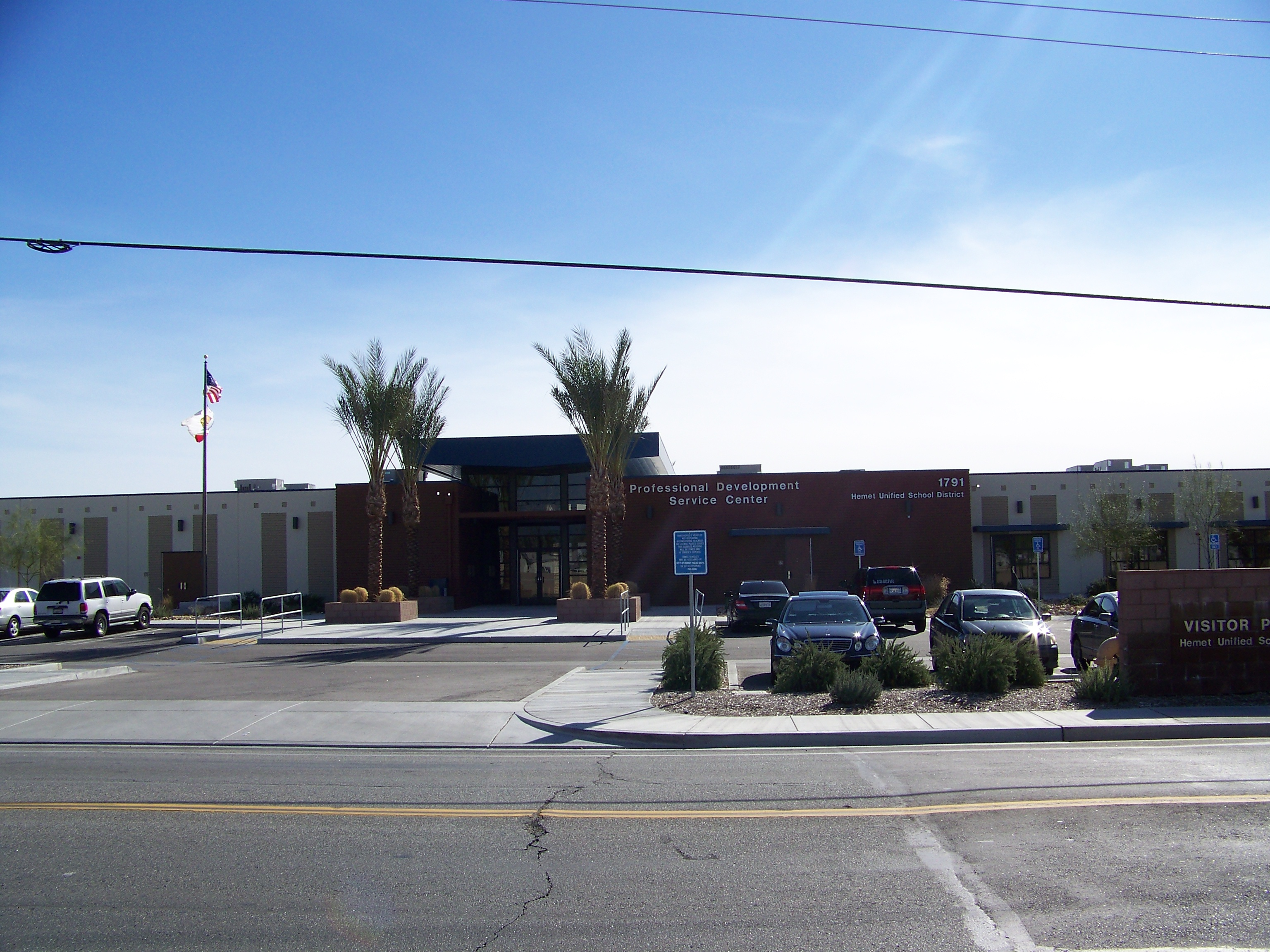
Hemet Unified School District Headquarters, built in 2007

The Hemet Unified School District has a total of 22,512 students. It serves the Hemet area as well as the unincorporated areas east and southeast of Hemet, such as Aguanga and Anza. It has total of 15 elementary schools, 5 middle schools, 5 high schools, and one preschool. It also provides 3 alternative schools. The district headquarters are located at 1791 West Acacia Avenue in Hemet.

==== San Jacinto Unified School District ====
San Jacinto Unified School District serves approximately 9,000 students in the city of San Jacinto. The district contains five elementary schools, two middle schools, two high schools, and also provides head start and preschool programs.

=== Colleges ===
The valley is served by a community college. Mt. San Jacinto College has served the valley since 1963. The college district was created in 1962 by a vote of the citizens of Banning, Beaumont, Hemet, and San Jacinto. The college enrolled its first students in the fall of 1963, holding classes in rented facilities. The San Jacinto Campus was opened in 1965 with two buildings and has grown into a full college campus serving the students and the community. In 1975, the residents of Temecula, Lake Elsinore, Perris and adjacent areas voted to join the Mt. San Jacinto Community College District, increasing the college’s area to the present 1,700 square miles (4,400 km^{2}). The San Jacinto Campus has been master-planned and essentially will be rebuilt over the next 15 to 20 years to accommodate 12,000 to 15,000 students. In the fall of 1993, the Alice P. Cutting Business & Technology Center opened to students with new laboratories for Business, Computer Information Science, Engineering Technologies, Electronics and Photography. In the fall of 1995, a state-of-the-art music building opened on the San Jacinto Campus.

== Museums ==
=== Estudillo Mansion ===
The Estudillo Mansion Museum is located in San Jacinto off Seventh Street and across from the San Jacinto train depot (no longer standing) where Agri-Empire offices are located.

=== Hemet Museum ===
The Hemet Museum is located in downtown Hemet, at the intersection of Florida Avenue and State Street, housed inside the historic Hemet Depot. It contains exhibits of the area's history, Native American artifacts found in the area, and information about the valley's agricultural past. It also includes exhibits on the "Ramona" pageant, as well as railroad exhibits.

=== Ramona Bowl Museum ===
The Ramona Bowl Museum is located at the Ramona Bowl, home of the Ramona Outdoor Play.

=== Ryan Field Museum ===
The Ryan Field Museum is located at Hemet-Ryan Field off Stetson Avenue in Hemet.

=== San Jacinto Museum ===
The San Jacinto Museum was founded in 1939 by citizens of the city. It features exhibits on the natural and human history of San Jacinto and surrounding areas. Local Indians relics, artifacts from pioneer families, and material on the community, its businesses and institutions are featured. Special exhibits highlight the record-breaking 1937 Soviet transpolar flight which landed in San Jacinto, and the development of downtown.

The Museum also maintains a large collection of historic photographs and memorabilia, which is available to researchers. Group tours are available by appointment.

=== Western Science Center ===
The Western Science Center is located in the southern area of Hemet. It features exhibits of Ice Age mammals, including 'Max', the largest mastodon found in the western United States, and as 'Xena', a Columbian Mammoth. It also has special exhibits that are a limited time only event. Recently it featured an exhibit called "The Music behind the Magic" which featured exhibits on the music in Walt Disney films. The museum also features an Immersion Theater that has a 270-degree screen.

=== Winchester Patterson House ===
The Patterson House was built in 1891 to replace a former adobe structure. The house measures 30 feet by 30 feet and is constructed of brick. The house is presently owned by The Winchester Historical Society of Pleasant Valley. The house is the oldest private residence still standing in what is now known as the community of Winchester. The Patterson family, John, wife Maria, daughters Tilla, Ida, and Jessie, and son Clarence, arrived in what was known as Rockhouse in 1883. They had traveled from Yountville through Los Angeles to come to their new home. The area they settled in was soon to become known as Pleasant Valley and later in 1887 as Winchester. As they passed through Los Angeles, Maria gathered pepper tree seeds which she planted at their new home. Some of these trees are still standing today. The family would soon become very influential in many aspects of the communities’ growth and prosperity. Listed below are some of the family’s accomplishments:

John Patterson

- Major land owner
- General store owner
- Blacksmith
- Tinsmith
- Board member of the first creamery in the area
- Part owner of the local brick works.
- Farmer
- Board member of the San Jacinto and Pleasant Valley Irrigation District.

=== Nearby Museums ===
The Patterson House is a museum in Winchester, and is the oldest building in the town. It is located just off Highway 79 (Winchester Road), on the southeast corner of Patterson Avenue and East Grand Avenue. The residence was built by Winchester pioneer John Patterson, over the ruins of an adobe home that was the headquarters of a Mexican rancho before 1850. Some museum visitors have claimed to experience poltergeist activities including phantom knocking, doors opening, and objects moving. Some claim it is the spirit of Lloyd Patterson, who died in the house of tuberculosis as a young man in the early 1900s.

== Historical Society ==
=== San Jacinto Valley Historical Society ===
The San Jacinto Valley Historical Connection is an online resource spawned from community interest in retaining the valley's history. In Hemet, the Historic Harvard District holds special events thought the year. In San Jacinto, one can find several historic homes on Main Street including the Vosburg Hotel.

== Transportation ==
=== State highways ===
Two state highways make their way through the valley: SR 74 and SR 79.

SR 74 begins in San Juan Capistrano at Interstate 5, heading through rural, mountainous portions of Orange County before reaching Riverside County. It descends into the city of Lake Elsinore and later reaches Perris, eventually overlapping with I-215 for roughly two miles. Continuing east, it passes through Romoland and Homeland, entering the San Jacinto Valley as Florida Avenue. At the eastern end of the valley, it begins to wind through the San Jacinto Mountains and eventually ends in Palm Desert.

SR 79 begins at Interstate 8, a few miles east of Alpine in San Diego County. It heads north to Julian and Warner Springs, eventually reaching Riverside County and the city of Temecula. After an overlap with I-15, SR 79 also makes its way into the valley. In Hemet, SR 79 overlaps State Route 74 (Florida Avenue), following it eastward for a few miles before heading north again through San Jacinto. It follows San Jacinto Avenue, North Ramona Boulevard, State Street, Ramona Expressway and Sanderson Avenue before going over the hills of Lambs Canyon and ending in Beaumont at Interstate 10.

=== Airports ===
There is one airport located in the San Jacinto valley: Hemet-Ryan Airport. In nearby French Valley, the French Valley Airport is located 15 miles (24 km) southwest of the San Jacinto Valley.

Hemet-Ryan Airport is located 3 miles (5 km) southwest of central Hemet, and serves as a municipal general aviation airport. Its elevation is 1,512 feet (461 m). It has two runways, one of which is 4,314 by 100 ft (1315 by 30 m) and has an asphalt surface. The other is 2,045 by 25 ft (623 by 8 m) and also has an asphalt surface. There are 236 airplanes based at the airport, 114 of which are single engine airplanes, 22 are multi-engine airplanes, 1 jet plane, and 9 helicopters. The airport is also home to a California Department of Forestry and Fire Protection (Riverside Unit) joint Air Attack/Helitack base. It is statistically one of the most active in the nation. The airport is owned and operated by Riverside County.

Airport	IATA code	ICAO code	County
Hemet-Ryan Airport	HMT	KHMT	Riverside

The Hemet-Ryan field was used during the war times and is home to the fire-fighter airplanes.

=== Mass transit ===
Mass transit in the valley is provided by the Riverside Transit Agency (RTA). The area is also served by an Amtrak bus stop near the corner of Sanderson Avenue and Florida Avenue in Hemet. The bus system provides a connection to other cities and communities in the Inland Empire, including Riverside, Temecula, Menifee, Banning, and Corona, as well as a commuter link to Escondido in San Diego County. RTA routes are 28, 31, 32, 33, 42, 74, 79, 217. Metrolink rail service is also in the planning stages for two stations in the area: one on the west side of Hemet and another in downtown Hemet.
