= Day Middle School =

Day Middle School may refer to the following schools:

- Frank A. Day Middle School in the Newton Public Schools district in Newton, Massachusetts
- James L. Day Middle School in the Temecula Valley Unified School District in Temecula, California
