= Southwestern League (California) =

High school athletic league in California

The Southwestern League is a high school athletic league that is part of the CIF Southern Section. Members are located in the southwestern Riverside County cities of Murrieta and Temecula.

== Members ==
- Chaparral High School
- Great Oak High School (Temecula, California)
- Murrieta Mesa High School
- Murrieta Valley High School
- Temecula Valley High School
- Vista Murrieta High School
