= Tucalota Creek =

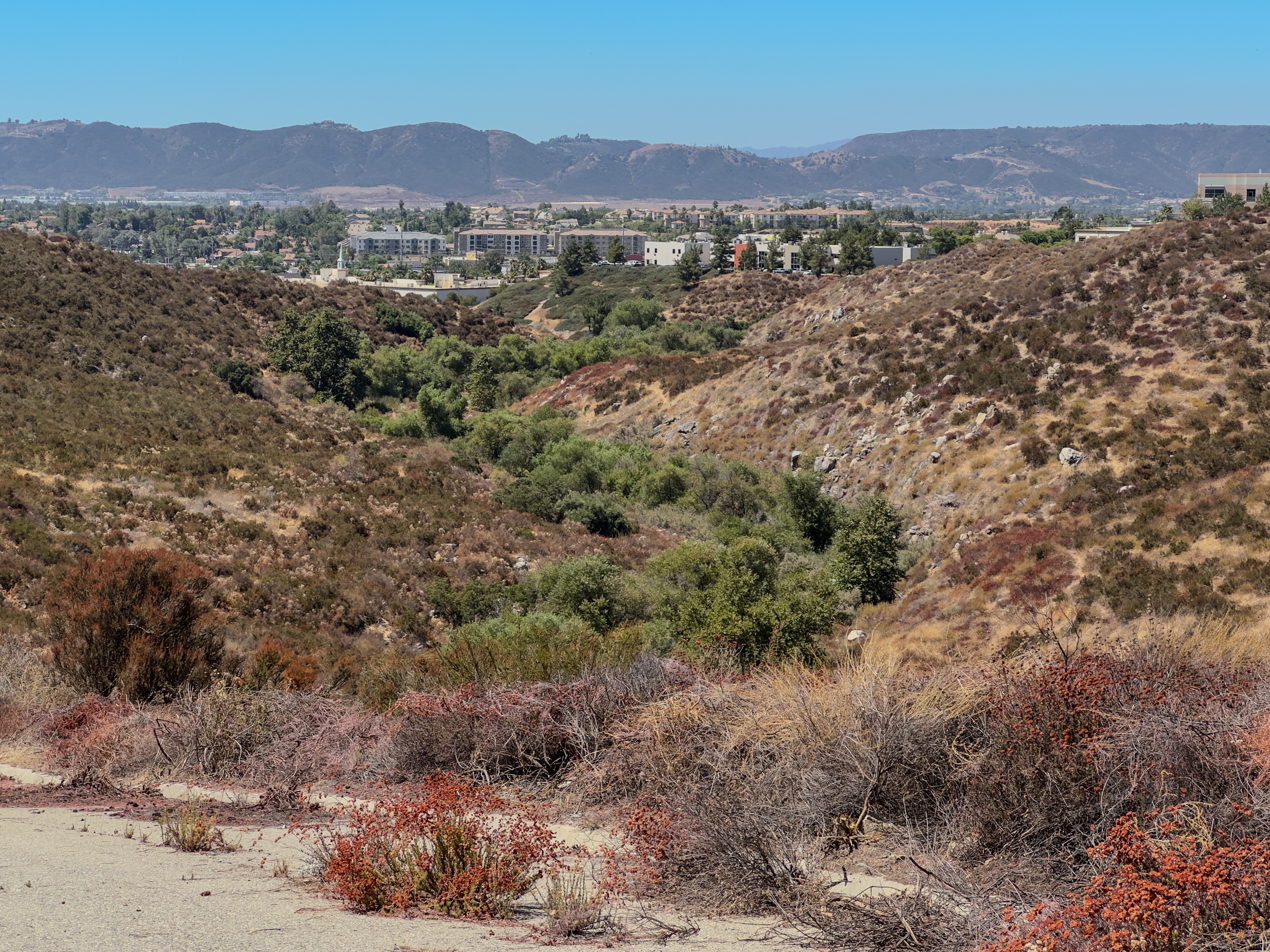
- Tucalota Creek in East Murrieta

- Location of the mouth within California

Location
- Country: United States
- State: California
- Region: Riverside County

Physical characteristics
- Source: Red Mountain, Rawson Mountains, Black Mountain, Bachelor Mountain, Tucalota Hills
  - coordinates: 33°37′9.09″N 116°50′56.08″W
  - elevation: 1,093 ft (333 m)
- Mouth: confluence with Santa Gertrudis Creek, tributary of Murrieta Creek
  - coordinates: 33°32′33.10″N 117°8′33.11″W
  - elevation: 1,093 ft (333 m)
- Length: 21 mi (34 km)

Tucalota Creek is a stream or arroyo in Riverside County, Southern California. It is a tributary of Santa Gertrudis Creek.

== Geography ==
The source of Tucalota Creek is located near Red Mountain in Hemet, California. Tucalota Creek drains the Rawson Mountains (south of Diamond and Domenigoni Valleys), Black Mountain, the western slopes of Red Mountain, the Magee Hills, the Tucalota Hills and Bachelor Mountain into Lake Skinner then to Santa Gertrudis Creek, a tributary of Murrieta Creek.
