= Murders of Jan Pietrzak and Quiana Jenkins-Pietrzak =

2008 murders in Winchester, California

Jan Paweł Pietrzak and Quiana Jenkins Pietrzak
- Jan Paweł and Quiana Jenkins-Pietrzak
- Born: March 13, 1984 (Jan Paweł) February 16, 1982 (Quiana)
- Died: October 15, 2008; Riverside County, California, USA
- Cause of death: Gunshot wounds to head
- Resting place: Riverside National Cemetery, Riverside County, California, USA

On October 15, 2008, United States Marine Corps Sergeant Jan Paweł Pietrzak (March 13, 1984 – October 15, 2008) and his wife Quiana Jenkins-Pietrzak (February 16, 1982 – October 15, 2008) were tortured, sexually assaulted and murdered by four American Marines.

== Overview ==
Pietrzak was a Polish American who joined the U.S. Marine Corps in 2003. After a tour in Iraq as a helicopter mechanic, Pietrzak returned to the United States, where he met and married Jenkins. Together, they owned and lived in a house in Winchester, a census-designated place in Riverside County, California, located near the Marine Corps Air Station Camp Pendleton, where Pietrzak worked.

On October 15, 2008, four Marines entered the Pietrzak home, sexually assaulted Jenkins-Pietrzak and tortured the couple before killing them. Two of the four accused Marines worked under Pietrzak's command. Despite efforts to convey the event as being racially motivated because the perpetrators were African American, Riverside County authorities maintain the motivation was robbery, and the pending murder with special circumstances and sexual assault charges do not include an assertion that the crime was racially motivated. According to the New York Daily News, "the words N----- Lover were found on the wall near the master bedroom and on a bathroom mirror, Riverside County Homicide Investigator Benjamin Ramirez testified." All four of the accused pled not guilty to murdering Pietrzak and his wife.

After meeting with the families of the deceased, District Attorney Rod Pacheco decided to seek the death penalty on January 22, 2009. The preliminary trial hearings to determine whether the four assailants would stand trial occurred on March 26, 2009, and April 3, 2009, in San Diego.

On 24 June 2013, a jury rendered a verdict of death for two of the four assailants and life in prison without parole for a third. The fourth assailant was later also sentenced to death.

== Background ==
Jan Paweł Pietrzak, named after Pope John Paul II, was born in either Kłodzko or Bielawa, Poland. In 1994, when Pietrzak was ten, his family emigrated to the U.S., and settled in the Bensonhurst neighborhood in Brooklyn, New York.

Pietrzak joined the Marines in 2003, became a helicopter mechanic and was sent to Iraq. After his return, he married Jenkins, whom he had met in 2005 at a party for Marines being deployed to Iraq. Jenkins, who worked for the local Black Infant Care Center, was initially reluctant to date a Marine. But Pietrzak won her over, and they were married on August 8, 2008. They bought a house in May in Winchester, an area near Temecula, California and near Camp Pendleton, and Pietrzak remained in the Marines, working as a helicopter airframe mechanic at the Marine Corps Air Station Miramar.

== Deaths ==
On October 15, 2008, a group of four Marines entered the Pietrzak home. It was not initially known how they managed to get in as Jenkins-Pietrzak was very careful about security and had equipped the house with an alarm. Later, it was alleged that Tyrone Miller forced entry into the residence by pointing a shotgun at Pietrzak.

After a short skirmish, the couple were bound with duct tape and gagged. Jenkins-Pietrzak was then sexually assaulted and raped as her husband was forced to watch. Finally, both were shot in the head, execution-style. Several small fires were set in the home in an apparent attempt to destroy evidence of the crime.

Lance Cpl. Emrys John, age 18, of Maryland, Lance Cpl. Kesaun Sykes, age 21, of California, Pvt. Kevin Darnell Cox, 20, of Tennessee, and Lance Cpl. Tyrone Miller, age 20, of North Carolina were charged with the murders. Two of them had worked for Pietrzak. Three of the suspects claim that the shooter was John. Miller and Cox have reportedly confessed to the murders, although all four suspects have accused the others of raping Jenkins-Pietrzak. Shortly before the murder, John posted "Chillin waitin 4 da killin" on his MySpace page.

== Motives ==
Three days after the murder, the Los Angeles Times ran an October 18, 2008, news brief noting that the bodies were identified on October 17. On November 3, the Sheriff's Department announced that it had four Marines under arrest for the murders. As part of the November 3 announcement, the Sheriff's Department noted that investigators had found numerous items of evidence since October 15 linking the four to the killings, even though the killers set a fire in the house to destroy evidence. On November 6, CNN television news journalist Jane Velez-Mitchell reported that the four Marines under arrest were African American and raised the possibility of race as a motivation.

In early November, the four Marines were charged with two counts of murder with special circumstances — murder during commission of a felony, murder during commission of a robbery and committing more than one offense. They additionally faced one charge each of sexual penetration with a foreign object, and the District Attorney's office will decide if to pursue death sentences. Just after the release of the charges, the New York Post ran a story entitled "A Few 'Bad' Men - Race Eyed in Marine Dual Slay" which noted that the four accused Marines "could face the death penalty amid speculation the mixed-race couple was targeted in a bias attack." At about the same time, District Attorney Rod Pacheco emphasized the robbery motive, commenting, "To burglarize their home and then to treat them in the way they did before they died and to murder them — it's hard for our minds to comprehend this kind of savagery."

By mid-November, the Riverside County Sheriff's Central Homicide unit responded to the race motivation issue, stating "There's nothing to suggest what happened was a racial crime." Detectives said jewelry, a camera, and wedding gifts had been stolen, and that some of the items were found in the suspects' barracks.

Despite the conclusion proposed by the investigators, the couple's parents and many in the general populace, as shown by blogs and posts over the Internet, continue to believe that there was a possible racial motive, particularly since Jenkins-Pietrzak was sexually assaulted, and there was evidence of premeditation in the murders (as 'Chillin waitin 4 da killin' was posted on a perpetrator's MySpace page before the murders) Anti-miscegenation racial epithets in the form of "Nigger Lover" were found on the wall near the master bedroom and on a bathroom mirror. The Defendants have all indicated that spray-painting the racial epithets was a calculated attempt to misdirect investigators.

On November 20, all four pleaded not guilty to murdering the Pietrzaks. District Attorney Rod Pacheco on February 2, 2009, decided to pursue the death penalty against the suspects.

== Correspondence and other involvement with White House ==
Pietrzak's mother, Henryka Pietrzak-Varga has repeatedly stated she believes the murders were racially motivated, as her son and daughter-in-law were not affluent individuals. On November 11, 2008 (Veteran's Day), Pietrzak's mother composed a formal letter to president-elect Barack Obama in which she discussed what her son and daughter-in-law had endured, and the possible primary motive for the murders. In this letter, Henryka stated: "If it was a robbery, why didn't they come when nobody was home instead of in the dead of night, armed to the teeth? ... What was it about my son and daughter-in-law that inspired such hatred and loathing?" Seven months later on July 27, 2009, the Obama administration responded with generic form letter of the type issued to all soldiers killed in combat. When knowledge of this indirect reply reached the news media, the Obama administration issued an apology.

The mothers of both Pietrzak and Jenkins requested a formal audience with President Obama; in a letter to the president, the mother of Sgt. Jan Paweł Pietrzak conveyed her wishes to discuss just "how the sacrifice of Jan Paweł and Quiana could unite us." On August 17, 2009, the Commissioner on Civil Rights in Poland also wrote to the U.S. Ambassador to Poland, supporting this request. The U.S. ambassador responded with a short letter on August 24, which although acknowledging Pietrzak's military service to the United States and stressing the general need for the perpetrators to be brought to account, was generally reticent to discuss a potential racial motivation for the murders.

== Criminal trials ==
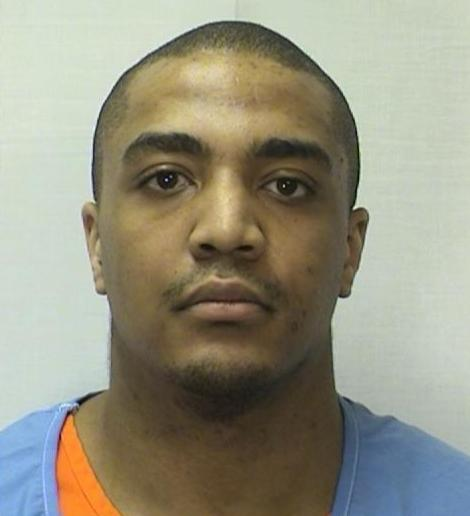
Emrys John in 2013.

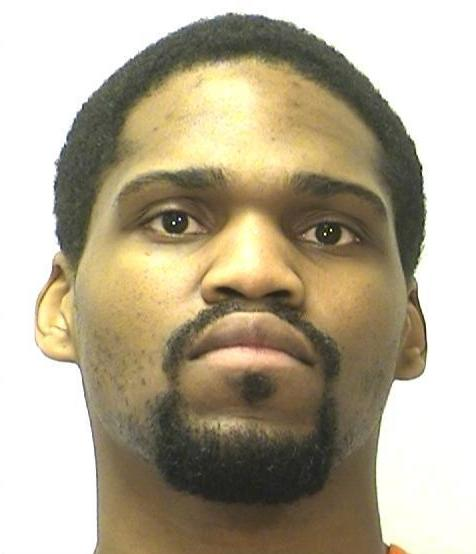
Tyrone Miller in 2013.

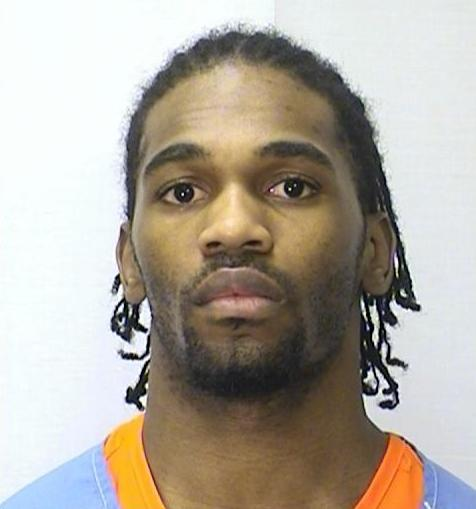
Kesaun Sykes in 2014.

All three men were sentenced to death and remain on California's death row at San Quentin State Prison.

On April 3, at a preliminary hearing for the four defendants, prosecutors alleged that the motivation for the crime was financial, not racial. Evidence, however, presented at the hearing detailed that two racist remarks were spray painted in the couple's home. Evidence was also presented showing that Jenkins-Pietrzak was sexually assaulted and that Jan was severely beaten. Riverside County investigator Benjamin Ramirez testified that property belonging to the couple was recovered from Miller's residence on Camp Pendleton, including bank cards, a bracelet with the couple's names written in Polish, and Pietrzak's dress blue uniform. Investigators further testified that footprints left at the crime scene were linked to shoes belonging to the suspects.

On May 8, 2009, a recording was played in court of Cox's girlfriend, Melissa Buck, stating that after Cox and the other three accused returned home after the alleged murder, they drank beer and that one of them said, "Good job, E. You earned your stripes tonight." Buck stated that the four had carried out other burglaries prior to the killings and that she had gone with them on one occasion.

In June, Miller's acquaintance Justin P. Weissinger testified that several days after the crime Miller had confided in him details of the assault and killing of the Pietrzaks. Weissinger had accompanied Miller and the other suspects on previous burglaries and home invasions.

On August 12, 2009, Riverside County Superior Court Judge Judith Clark ordered the four defendants to be tried for the deaths of the Pietrzaks. The re-arraignment was scheduled for August 26.

The trial of the four was suspended on February 1, 2011, after Kesaun Sykes urinated during a court hearing. The judge ordered a psychological evaluation for Sykes. Sykes' mental competency trial began on May 24, 2011. The jury returned a verdict of mentally fit after two hours of deliberations. In response, the judge ordered criminal proceedings to resume against Sykes and his co-defendants.

Three of the defendants, Kevin Darnell Cox, 25, Emrys Justin John, 23, and Tyrone Miller, 25, went on trial for murder and related charges on Monday, April 8, 2013, at 9 a.m. at the Riverside Hall of Justice. Two separate juries, one for Cox and another for John and Miller, were empaneled to hear the case. The fourth defendant, 25-year-old Kesaun Kedron Sykes, was tried separately because there was not enough space in the Hall of Justice for three juries.

On June 5, 2013, Cox and John were convicted of two counts of first-degree murder. Miller was convicted of sexual penetration with a foreign object and two counts of first-degree murder.

On June 20, 2013, one jury returned a verdict of death against Tyrone Miller and Emrys John, and a separate jury returned a life without possibility of parole verdict as to Cox. The fourth defendant, Kesaun Sykes, was sentenced to death on November 7, 2014.

On July 19, 2013, in Riverside Superior Court, Miller was sentenced to death. On August 16, 2013, Cox and John were sentenced. Cox was sentenced to two life terms without parole. Cox showed no remorse stating, "I apologize for what happened to the victims' family. I didn't say I'm sorry I did anything because I still don't feel that I did anything to be here for it." He also said he would appeal. John, the gunman, was given the death penalty. Judge Christian Theirbach called the murders savage, and the most inhuman he had seen in his 27 years on the bench.

== See also ==
- List of homicides in California
- List of death row inmates in the United States
