= Chaparral High School (Temecula, California) =

Public school in California, United States

Location
- 27215 Nicolas Road; Temecula, Riverside County, California 92591; United States; 33°32′18″N 117°08′51″W

Information
- Type: Public secondary
- Established: 1997
- School district: Temecula Valley Unified School District
- Area trustee: Sandy Hinkson, Trustee Area 3
- Principal: Tina Miller
- Teaching staff: 119.35 (FTE)
- Grades: 9–12
- Enrollment: 3,136 (2024-2025)
- Student to teacher ratio: 26.28
- Language: English
- Campus: Suburban
- Colors: Navy, dark green and platinum
- Song: Hail to the Victors
- Athletics conference: Southwestern League
- Mascot: Puma
- Newspaper: The Platinum Press
- Yearbook: The Prowler
- Communities served: Temecula Murrieta French Valley
- Website: chs.tvusd.k12.ca.us

Chaparral High School, colloquially known as Chap, is a public, 4-year comprehensive high school in Temecula, California, United States. The school serves students in grades 9 through 12 and is one of five high schools in the Temecula Valley Unified School District.

== History ==
The school opened in 1997 with a class of freshmen and sophomores, and added juniors the following year and seniors after that, graduating its first class in 2000. It was the second comprehensive high school built in the Temecula Valley Unified School District, after Temecula Valley, and was constructed at a cost of $36 million. The puma was chosen over the cougar for the school mascot, and platinum was chosen for a school color instead of flat silver. It was also named a California Gold Ribbon School in 2017.

The school became the subject of media attention after it cooperated with the local police in orchestrating an undercover drug sting which resulted in the arrest of an autistic teenager.

The school was named the best National Student Section by the Student Section Report in 2024.

== Demographics ==
White	Latino	Asian	African American	Pacific Islander	American Indian	Two or more races	Ref
40%	34%	11%	5%	<1%	1%	9%	

According to U.S. News & World Report, 66% of Chaparral's student body are minorities, with 30% of the student body coming from economically disadvantaged households, as determined by student eligibility for California's reduced-price meal program.

== Athletics ==
The school's construction included an Olympic-sized pool, to be shared with Temecula Valley High. Puma athletic teams compete in the Southwestern League. The varsity football team won a CIF-SS championship against Vista Murrieta High School in 2009. The girl's varsity water polo team were crowned CIF-SS Division 5 Champions after their win against Troy High School in 2024.

== Performing arts ==
Chaparral High School fields two competitive show choirs, the mixed-gender "Platinum FX" and the all-female "Dynamics". The school also has an all-male group, "Forte". The program also hosts an annual competition.

== Feeder schools ==
- Elementary: Alamos Elementary School, French Valley Elementary School, Susan LaVorgna Elementary School, Ysabel Barnett Elementary School, Temecula Elementary School
- Middle: James L. Day Middle School, Bella Vista Middle School

== Notable alumni ==
- Rob Brantly, professional baseball player
- Allen Craig, professional baseball player
- Justin Dedich, professional football player
- Braylon Doughty, professional baseball player
- Tyler Glenn, lead singer of the band Neon Trees
- Sarah Hammer, Olympic track cycler
- Tyler Hansen, professional football player
- Sean Manganti, basketball player
- Shane Peterson, professional baseball player
