= French Valley =

Geographic Center of French Valley

French Valley is a region located in southwestern Riverside County, near the cities and communities of Hemet, Winchester, Murrieta, and Temecula in the state of California, United States. It is part of the Plains of Leon, contiguous with the Perris Plain, that drains into the Temecula Basin by means of tributaries of the Santa Margarita River.

== History ==
Since the late 1800s, the French Valley was home to French grain farmers and sheepherders. After the Franco-Prussian War and the Alsace becoming German, many French-speaking residents fled to America. Among the early settlers of the French Valley were Auguste Giagnaire, Jean Labrucherie and Alexandre, Auguste and Calixte Vial, the Pourroys and the Nicolases. The train network eventually reached Temecula and Murrieta, but not the area inhabited by the French. The first use of the name "French Valley" occurred in 1913 in a California Conservation Commission report.

A traditional lifestyle was maintained until 1964 when the Metropolitan Water District of Southern California acquired 6,000 acres of land to build the Skinner Reservoir that started operating in 1976. Many ranches were immersed in the new lake.

In 1989, the French Valley Airport was inaugurated. It was built on the land of the Borel family. In 1993, a jail opened, and later became the Southwest Justice Center.

In 2007, 702 acres of the French Valley were designated as a wildlife area by the California Department of Fish and Wildlife.

== Geography ==
According to the U.S. Geographic Names Information System, the valley runs from its head at 33.6516902°N 117.0736395°W to its mouth at 33.5958583°N 117.1250307°W.

Other places nearby include the Skinner Reservoir in the Lake Skinner Park, and Diamond Valley Lake.

French Valley is located within 10 minutes of nearby cities Temecula and Murrieta as well as the 15 and 215 freeways. French Valley is also less than 15 minutes from the Temecula Valley Wine Country and Old Town Temecula. The nearby French Valley Airport is named after the valley.

French Valley is considered to be in the greater Inland Empire region of Southern California. It boasts mild winters with highs in the 60s (°F) and overnight lows in the 40s (°F). The summers are very warm with temperatures averaging 102 °F (39 °C) but sometimes soaring up to 107 °F (42 °C).

French Valley's schools are in the Temecula Valley Unified School District.
