= Temecula Preparatory School =

Location
- 35777 Abelia St; French Valley, California 92596; United States
- Coordinates: 33°36′15″N 117°05′08″W

Information
- School type: Charter School
- Motto: A Heritage of Virtue, Wisdom and Knowledge
- Established: September 2000
- School district: Temecula Valley Unified School District
- CEEB code: 053643
- NCES School ID: 060002808564
- Principal: Julie Fuller
- Staff: 22
- Faculty: 54
- Grades: K-12
- Age range: 5 - 18 years old
- Hours in school day: 8:45 a.m. to 3:35 p.m.
- Colors: Red, White and Blue
- Mascot: Patriot
- Accreditation: K-12 WASC Accredited
- API average: 880
- Tuition: None
- Website: www.temeculaprep.com

Temecula Preparatory School is a tuition-free, K-12, public charter school located in French Valley, California, just north of Temecula. The school is sponsored by the Temecula Valley Unified School District and was formerly managed and operated by Heritage Classical Charter Schools of America. It follows the principles of Classical Education, with an emphasis on the four platonic virtues from antiquity: Justice, Prudence, Fortitude, and Temperance. TPS athletic teams have won several league championships. TPS curriculum has an emphasis on the arts and provides instruction in theater, art and music.

== Sources ==
- "Temecula Preparatory School in Winchester, California (CA)". City-Data.com.
- Rothgeb, Jim (May 31, 2012). "MURRIETA: Temecula Prep grads set to embark on new ventures". Murrieta, CA. NC Times.
- "Parent And Teacher Support". PATS.
