= Braylon Doughty =

American baseball player (born 2005)

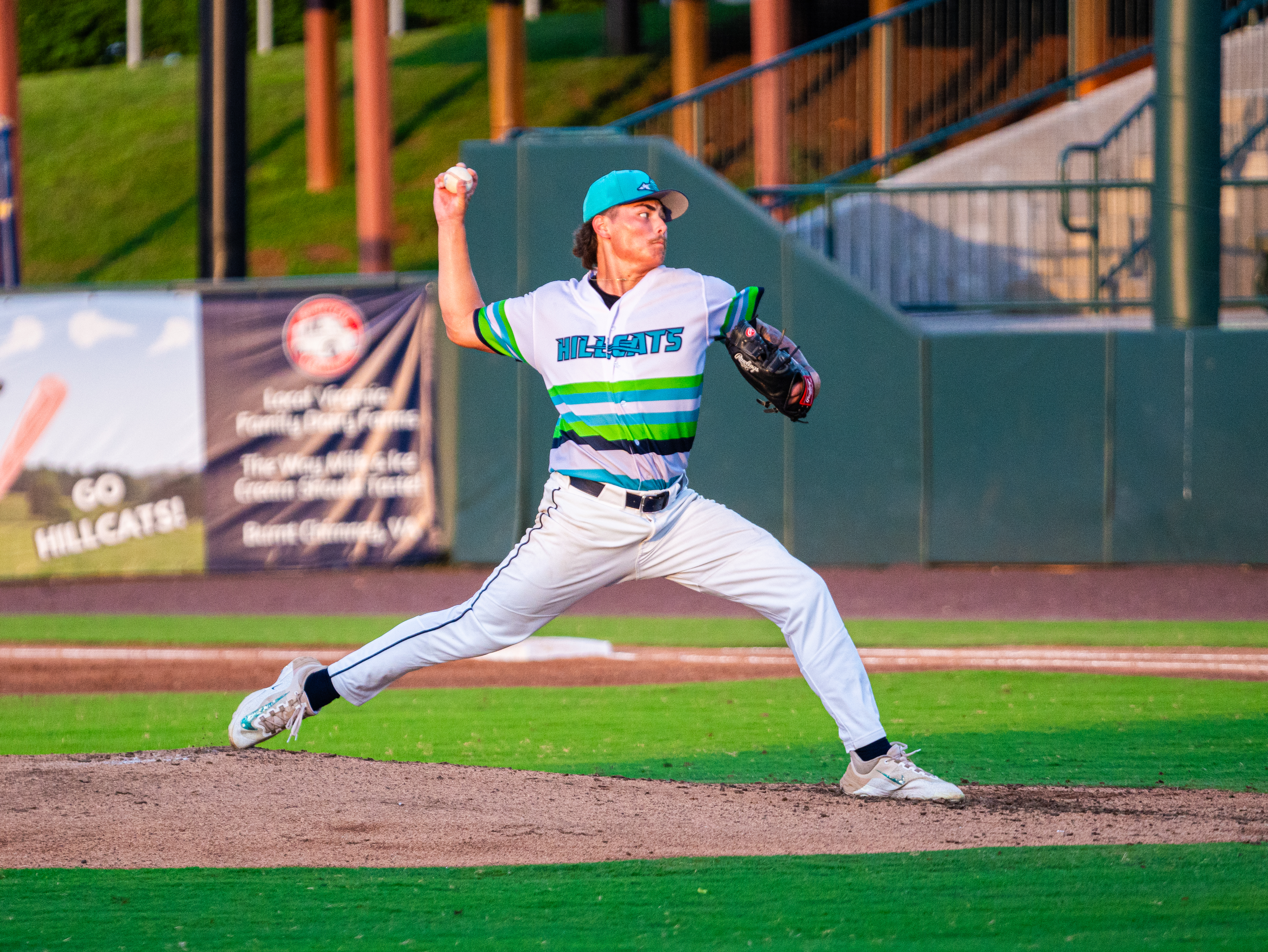
- Doughty with Hillcats in 2025

Cleveland Guardians
- Pitcher
- Born: December 7, 2005 (age 20); Murrieta, California, U.S.
- Bats: Right Throws: Right
- Stats at Baseball Reference

Braylon Michael Doughty (born December 7, 2005) is an American professional baseball pitcher in the Cleveland Guardians organization.

== Amateur career ==
Doughty attended Chaparral High School located in Temecula, California. As a senior in 2024, he had a 1.11 earned run average (ERA), 85 strikeouts, and 10 walks across 50 1/3 innings pitched. Doughty committed to play college baseball for the Oklahoma State Cowboys.

== Professional career ==
Doughty was selected by the Cleveland Guardians with the 36th overall pick in the 2024 Major League Baseball draft. On July 27, he signed with the Guardians on a $2.5 million contract.

Doughty made his professional debut in 2025 with the Single-A Lynchburg Hillcats. Across 22 starts, he had a 0-7 record, a 3.48 ERA, and 99 strikeouts over 85 1/3 innings. His season ended in August after being placed on the injured list with right shoulder inflammation. He was assigned to the High-A Lake County Captains to open the 2026 season.
