= Solar Cup =

Eco-boating competition in California, United States

The Solar Cup is an eco-boating competition in Temecula, California. Paid for by the Metropolitan Water District of Southern California and taking place on Lake Skinner, the competition revolves around high school teams constructing solar powered electric boats. Boats are built from identical kits of marine-caliber wood provided by the water district, and are generally 16 feet long, and weigh about 250 pounds. This competition is inspired by the Solar Splash competition at the university level.

Solar Cup begins with sign up in December, and includes a boat-building event and several workshops focusing on technical aspects such as drive trains, electrical systems, solar power collection and steering systems. Teams are also required to meet deadlines for submitting illustrated reports on these systems. In 2007 the competition was split between "veteran" (returning) and "rookie" (new) teams. The competition is a scored event, divided up into several categories: Technical Reports, Workshops, Visual Displays, Qualifying Times, Endurance Distance, and Sprint Times. Combined, all of these categories add up for a 1000 maximum possible points. Overall, 41 teams competed in 2007, and 36 teams competed in 2010.

== Competition results ==
Year	Solar Cup Veteran Winner	Solar Cup Rookie Winner
2003	Canyon High School	
2004	Canyon High School	
2005	Canyon High School	
2006	Diamond Bar High School	
2007	Diamond Bar High School	Duarte High School
2008	Nogales High School	Palos Verdes Peninsula High School
2009	Canyon High School	Savanna High School
2010	Canyon High School	Scripps Ranch High School
2011	Savanna High School	Oak Park High School
2012	Canyon High School	South El Monte High School
2013	Savanna High School	Glendora High School
2015	Canyon Springs High School	Oxford Academy
2016	Riverside Poly High School	Kaiser High School
2017	Riverside Poly High School	Mira Costa High School
2018	Riverside Poly High School	Costa Mesa High School
2019	Oxford Academy (California)	Oaks Christian School
