= Great Oak High School =

Public high school in Temecula, California

Coordinates: 33°27′10″N 117°05′33″W

Location
- 32555 Deer Hollow Way; Temecula, California 92592; United States

Information
- Established: 2004
- School district: Temecula Valley Unified School District
- Principal: Amber Lane
- Teaching staff: 117.76 (FTE)
- Grades: 9th - 12th
- Enrollment: 2,946 (2024-2025)
- Student to teacher ratio: 25.02
- Colors: Red, navy, and white
- Mascot: Wolfpack
- Rival: Temecula Valley High School
- Website: gohs.tvusd.k12.ca.us

Great Oak High School is a public high school at the base of Wolf Valley in Temecula, California, US, in the Temecula Valley Unified School District. In 2009 and 2010, Great Oak High School was listed in Newsweek's annual top 1000 high schools in America. As of 2024, GOHS is ranked #973 nationally and ranked 129th in the State of California. Great Oak High School has been a California Distinguished School since 2009 and is also a California Gold Ribbon School.

In addition to Advanced Placement courses, Great Oak offers the International Baccalaureate Diploma Programme. It has been an IB World School since 2006.

== Athletics ==
Great Oak High School's athletic teams are known as the Wolfpack and compete in California's CIF Southern Section.

=== State titles ===
- Girls' Cross Country: 2010, 2012, 2013, 2014, 2015, 2016, 2017, and 2018 Division 1 CIF State Champions.
- Boys' Cross Country: 2014, 2015, 2016, 2017, 2018, 2019, and 2022 Division 1 CIF State Champions.

== Competition cheer, dance and step teams ==
Great Oak High School has varsity and junior varsity competition cheerleading, dance, and step teams. The Great Oak Step Team is nationally recognized and received 3rd place at the 2015 National Step Association Nationals.

=== National titles ===
- 2015 Varsity Competition Cheer — National Champion (Varsity Show Cheer Level 2 Large), Jamz School Nationals.
- 2014 Varsity Competition Cheer — National Champion, Jamz School Nationals.

== Spirit of Great Oak ==
Spirit of Great Oak is the marching and indoor performance ensemble of Great Oak High School. The program was founded to provide students with opportunities in both marching and indoor ensembles. It is supported by the Spirit of Great Oak (SOGO) Band Boosters. The marching band competes in the California State Band Championships (CSBC), earning a first-place finish in 2022 and third place in 2024. The band has performed internationally in the London New Year's Day Parade and in Rome, Italy, and has participated in the Disneyland Christmas parade. The Spirit of Great Oak participates in Southern California Percussion Alliance (SCPA) and Winter Guard International (WGI) competitions.

=== Notable Performances ===
| Year | Event | Location | Class / Placement |
|---|---|---|---|
| 2022 | California State Band Championships | Huntington Beach, CA | 1st Place, Division |
| 2024 | California State Band Championships | Huntington Beach, CA | 3rd Place, Division |
| 2022 | SCPA Championship | Toyota Arena, Ontario, CA | 1st Place, PSO |
| 2023 | SCPA Championship | Southern California | 8th Place Prelims, PSW |
| 2024 | SCPA Championship | San Bernardino, CA | 1st Place, PSO |
| 2014 | WGI World Championships | Dayton, OH | 7th, Scholastic Open |
| 2023 | WGI World Championships | Dayton, OH | 9th, PSW Prelims |
| 2025 | WGI World Championships | Dayton, OH | 15th, PSO Finals |
| 2013 & 2019 | London New Year’s Day Parade | London, UK | Performance |
| 2023 | New Year’s Day Parade | Rome, Italy | Performance |
| 2024 | Disneyland Christmas Parade | Anaheim, CA | Performance |

== Incidents ==
- In September 2023, LGBTQ+ students protested a district flag policy.

== Notable alumni ==
- Gavin Fien, third baseman in the Washington Nationals organization
