= Murrieta Hot Springs, California =

- District of Murrieta; Former census-designated place
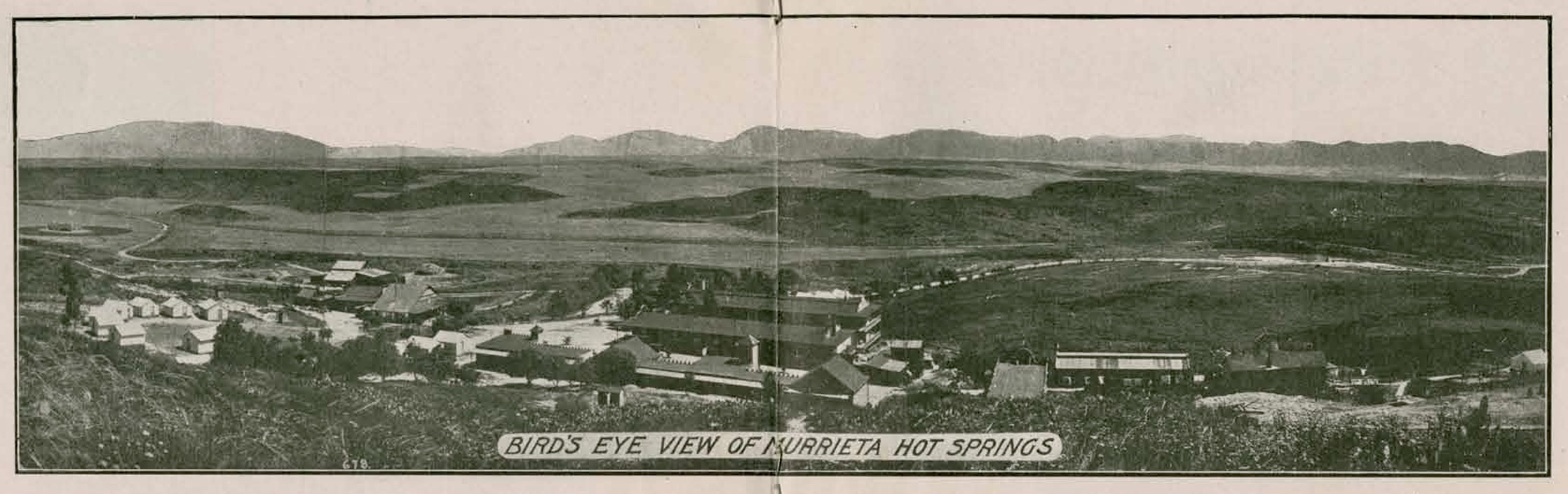
- Bird's eye view panorama of Murrieta Mineral Hot Springs, c. 1920

- Location in Riverside County and the state of California
- Coordinates: 33°33′46″N 117°9′20″W
- Country: United States
- State: California
- County: Riverside

Area
  - Total: 1.3 sq mi (3.3 km^{2})
  - Land: 1.3 sq mi (3.3 km^{2})
  - Water: 0 sq mi (0 km^{2})
- Elevation: 1,194 ft (364 m)

Population (2000)
  - Total: 2,948
  - Density: 2,314/sq mi (893.3/km^{2})
- Time zone: UTC-8 (PST)
  - Summer (DST): UTC-7 (PDT)
- ZIP codes: 92563
- Area code: 951
- FIPS code: 06-50090
- GNIS feature ID: 1661080

Murrieta Hot Springs is a neighborhood in the eastern region of Murrieta, California, which was annexed on July 1, 2002. Prior to annexation, Murrieta Hot Springs was a Census-designated place of Riverside County, California. The population was 2,948 at the 2000 census. The ZIP Code 92362 was originally used, until 92563 was introduced in the early 1990s.

The neighborhood grew up around a hot springs spa that was developed as a resort starting in the 1880s and became a college campus and conference center in the 1990s.

== Geography ==
According to the United States Census Bureau, the CDP has a total area of 1.3 square miles (3.3 km^{2}), of which 1.3 square miles (3.3 km^{2}) is land and 0.78% is water.

French Valley Airport (FAA designator: F70), with a 6,000-foot (1,800 m) runway, is near Murrieta Hot Springs.

== History ==
The Luiseño called the thermal springs Cherukanukna Hakiwuna. They bathed in the warm water and took mud baths; Spanish settlers later also made use of the water for healing. Like the city, the springs acquired their name from Don Juan Murrieta, on whose land grant they were located.

The springs had been used for a Chinese laundry before the Temecula Land & Water Company developed the site in 1884 with a hotel and a bathhouse. Testimonials were published concerning the healing properties of the water. Fritz Guenther, a German who had settled in Los Angeles, bought the tract in 1902, built two new hotels and a new bathhouse, and later added cottages. The resort became popular, particularly with Jewish visitors, who were excluded from some other resorts. Guenther also happened to have used six-pointed stars in the decor. The Guenther family operated the spa until the late 1960s; in addition to the 48-room California Hotel, it included an assembly hall, the 63-room Stone Lodge and mosaic-tiled mudbath building, both built in 1926, a 1928 swimming pool, and a nature-care spa with private baths dating to 1936.

In January 1970, Murrieta Hot Springs and the surrounding area, some 500 acres, was sold to Irvin Kahn, a San Diego attorney and real estate developer who had visited the spa as a child. Kahn purchased additional land and with Teamsters Union lawyer Morris Shenker as co-owner, constructed a mobile home park above the spa and held golf and tennis tournaments. The resort continued to be popular with Jews; in 1973 a synagogue was built next door. After Kahn died unexpectedly in 1973, the resort property changed hands several times. By then it had two additional pools, a sauna, and tennis courts, and abutted Rancho California Golf Course. In 1975 R. J. Rudd leased it for a clinic where he claimed he could cure cancer using a lemon juice diet; the clinic was closed after Rudd was indicted in 1977 for medical and financial fraud and was featured on 60 Minutes in January 1978. The resort closed in 1977.

In 1982, the resort was purchased by Alive Polarity, a group who operated a non-smoking teetotal vegetarian commune there. In 1987, Gary Naiman of San Diego bought it and renovated the guest accommodations.

The resort then became neglected. In 1995, Calvary Chapel Of Santa Ana bought it and used it as the campus of Calvary Chapel Bible College, with dormitories, libraries, and a conference center.

Following closure of the campus and conference center because of the COVID-19 pandemic, in August 2022 Calvary Chapel sold the Murrieta Hot Springs property to Olympus Real Estate Group, who own properties including the Springs Resort in Pagosa Springs, Colorado. It reopened as a spa resort in February 2024, with renovations continuing.

Following the February 2024 reopening, the Murrieta Hot Springs Resort was repositioned as a full-service wellness destination focused on a structured path to catharsis and relaxation. The renovated 46-acre property includes over fifty geothermal pools, a second-story cedar sauna room, and a geothermal mud experience. A notable feature of the modern resort is the Kneipp Walk, a "contrast bathing" experience where guests wade through alternating hot (up to 103°F) and cold (down to 48°F) pools to stimulate circulation. The resort also offers a curated program of activities, including aqua yoga, sound baths, and vigorous fitness classes designed to encourage guests to move beyond passive soaking.

== Government ==
In the California State Legislature, Murrieta Hot Springs is in the 28th senatorial district, represented by Democrat Lola Smallwood-Cuevas, and in the 67th Assembly district, represented by Democrat Sharon Quirk-Silva.

In the United States House of Representatives, Murrieta Hot Springs is in California's 42nd congressional district, represented by Democrat Robert Garcia.
