= French Valley, California =

French Valley
- census-designated place
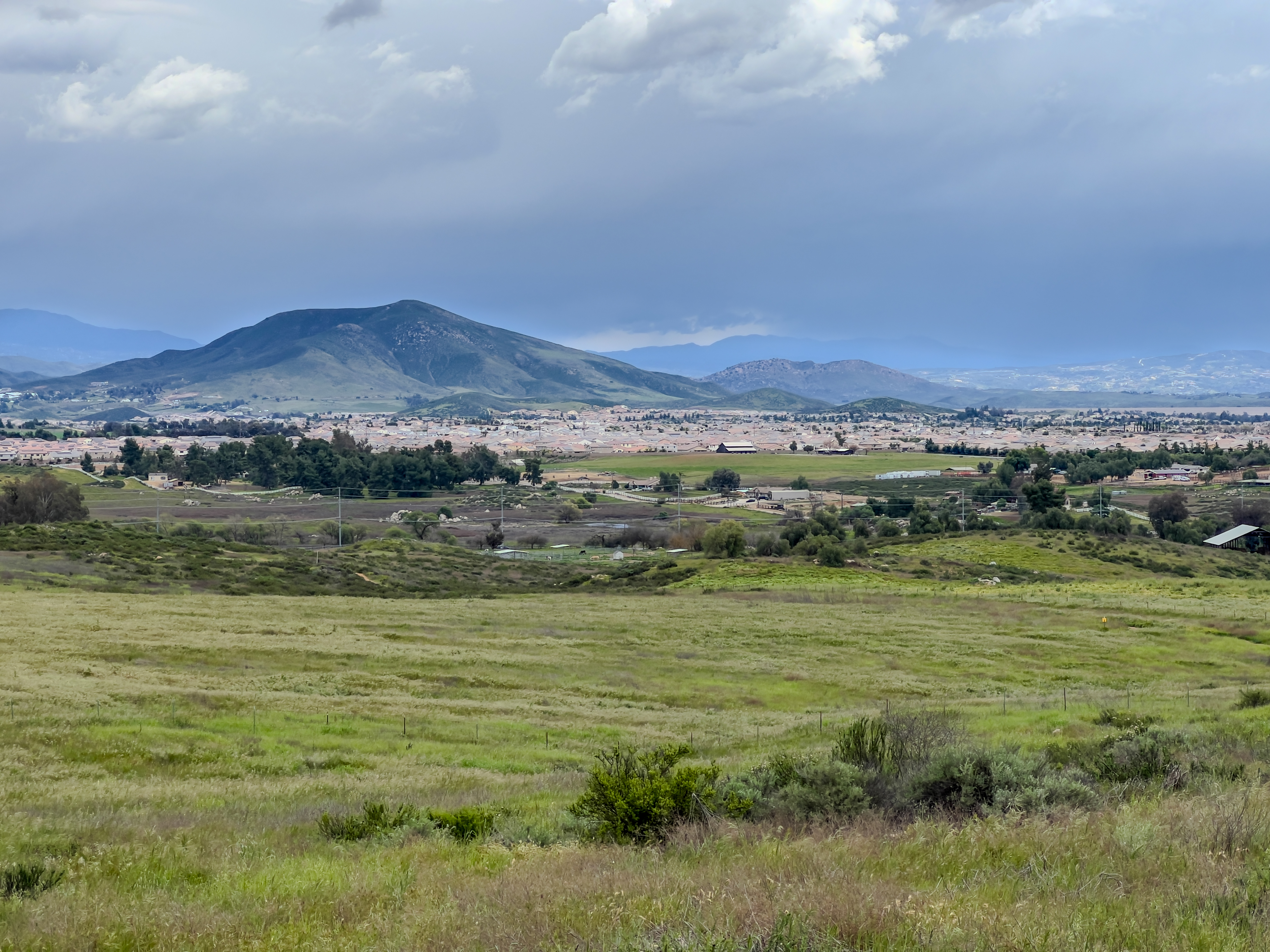
- French Valley with Bachelor Mountain, Tucalota Hills in the background

- Location of French Valley in Riverside County, California.

- Position in California.
- Coordinates: 33°35′58″N 117°06′23″W
- Country: United States
- State: California
- County: Riverside

Area
  - Total: 10.879 sq mi (28.176 km^{2})
  - Land: 10.873 sq mi (28.161 km^{2})
  - Water: 0.0058 sq mi (0.015 km^{2}) 0.06%
- Elevation: 1,368 ft (417 m)

Population (2020)
  - Total: 35,280
  - Density: 3,245/sq mi (1,253/km^{2})
- Time zone: UTC-8 (Pacific (PST))
  - Summer (DST): UTC-7 (PDT)
- ZIP Code: 92563, 92596
- Area code: 951
- GNIS feature ID: 2583019

French Valley is a census-designated place located in the French Valley of Riverside County, California. The 2020 United States census reported French Valley's population as 35,280, up from 23,067 at the 2010 census. It became the most populous CDP in Riverside County when Rubidoux was incorporated into Jurupa Valley.

== Geography ==
French Valley sits at an elevation of 1,368 feet (417 m). According to the United States Census Bureau, the CDP covers an area of 10.9 square miles (28.2 km^{2}), 99.94% of it land, and 0.06% of it water.

== Demographics ==
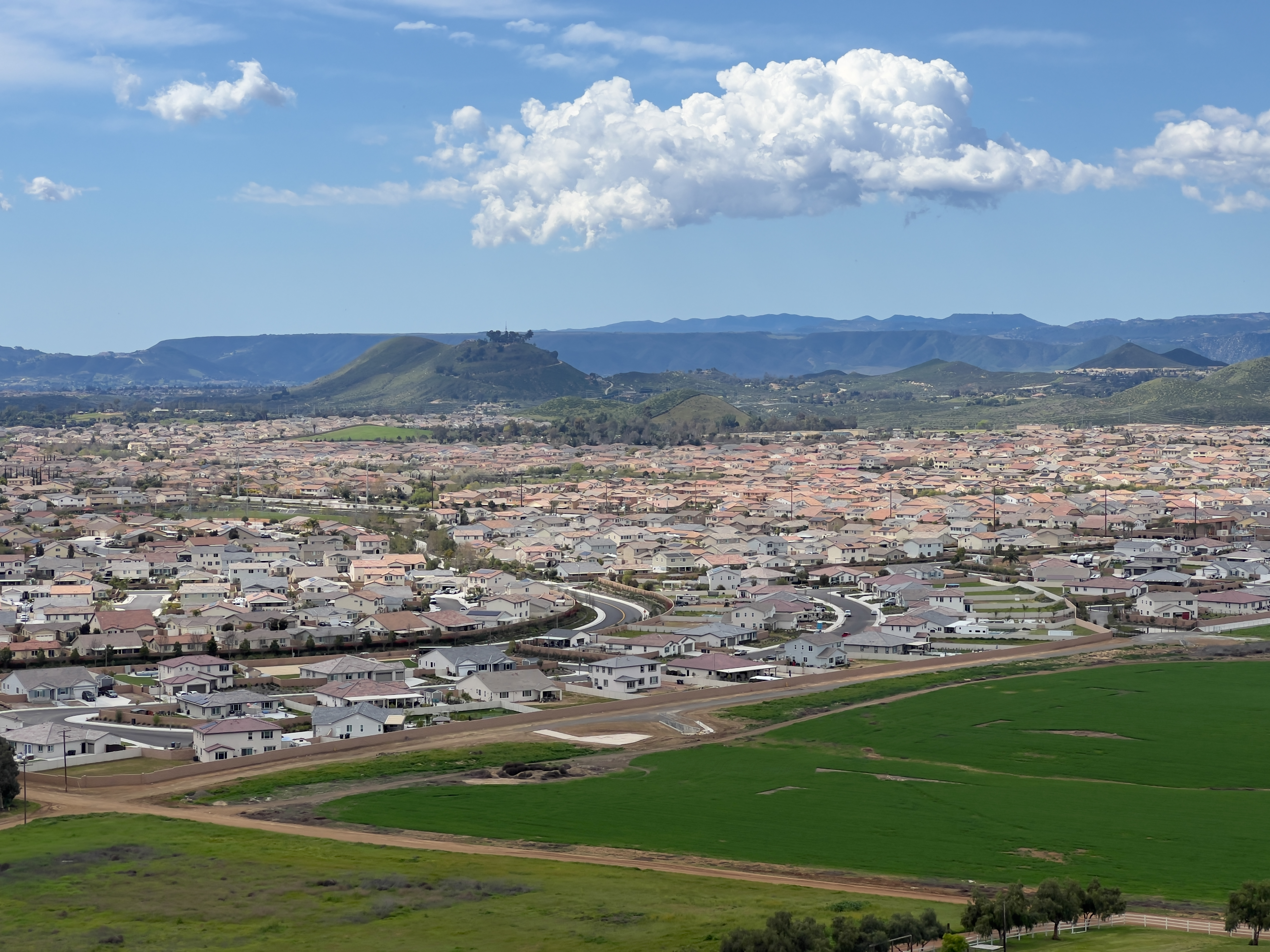
French Valley Field and Homes, Murrieta Hogbacks and Santa Rosa Plateau can be seen in the background

Historical population
Census	Pop.	Note	%±
2010	23,067		—
2020	35,280		52.9%
U.S. Decennial Census; 1860–1870 1880-1890; 1900 1910 1920; 1930 1940 1950; 1960 1970 1980; 1990 2000 2010

French Valley first appeared as a census designated place in the 2010 U.S. census.

=== Racial and ethnic composition ===
French Valley CDP, California – Racial and ethnic composition Note: the US Census treats Hispanic/Latino as an ethnic category. This table excludes Latinos from the racial categories and assigns them to a separate category. Hispanics/Latinos may be of any race.
Race / Ethnicity (NH = Non-Hispanic)	Pop 2010	Pop 2020	% 2010	% 2020
White alone (NH)	11,235	14,678	48.71%	41.60%
Black or African American alone (NH)	1,700	2,559	7.37%	7.25%
Native American or Alaska Native alone (NH)	114	148	0.49%	0.42%
Asian alone (NH)	2,592	4,417	11.24%	12.52%
Native Hawaiian or Pacific Islander alone (NH)	118	192	0.51%	0.54%
Other race alone (NH)	32	168	0.14%	0.48%
Mixed race or Multiracial (NH)	958	2,443	4.15%	6.92%
Hispanic or Latino (any race)	6,318	10,675	27.39%	30.26%
Total	23,067	35,280	100.00%	100.00%

=== 2020 census ===
As of the 2020 census, French Valley had a population of 35,280 and a population density of 3,244.7 inhabitants per square mile (1,252.8/km^{2}). The median age was 34.7 years; 31.0% were under the age of 18, 8.7% were aged 18 to 24, 27.4% were aged 25 to 44, 23.1% were aged 45 to 64, and 9.9% were 65 years of age or older. For every 100 females there were 97.1 males, and for every 100 females age 18 and over there were 94.1 males age 18 and over.

The census reported that 99.9% of residents lived in households, 0.0% lived in non-institutionalized group quarters, and 0.1% were institutionalized.

There were 9,665 households in French Valley, of which 54.2% had children under the age of 18 living in them. Of all households, 72.7% were married-couple households, 4.6% were cohabiting-couple households, 8.5% had a male householder with no spouse or partner present, and 14.2% had a female householder with no spouse or partner present. About 8.3% of all households were made up of individuals and 3.1% had someone living alone who was 65 years of age or older. There were 8,538 families, accounting for 88.3% of households.

There were 9,848 housing units, of which 1.9% were vacant. The homeowner vacancy rate was 0.7% and the rental vacancy rate was 2.9%. Occupied units were 86.2% owner-occupied and 13.8% occupied by renters.

99.0% of residents lived in urban areas, while 1.0% lived in rural areas.

Racial composition as of the 2020 census
Race	Number	Percent
White	17,313	49.1%
Black or African American	2,724	7.7%
American Indian and Alaska Native	392	1.1%
Asian	4,589	13.0%
Native Hawaiian and Other Pacific Islander	230	0.7%
Some other race	3,544	10.0%
Two or more races	6,488	18.4%

=== Income ===
In 2023, the US Census Bureau estimated that the median household income was $132,605, and the per capita income was $41,363. About 2.5% of families and 4.8% of the population were below the poverty line.

== Education ==
The majority of the territory of the CDP is covered by the Temecula Valley Unified School District. The northwestern portion of French Valley is served by schools operated by the Murrieta Valley Unified School District in one portion, and the Menifee Union School District and the Perris Union High School District (for grades 9-12) in another portion.

=== Elementary schools ===
- Alamos Elementary School
- French Valley Elementary School
- Lisa J. Mails Elementary School
- Susan LaVorgna Elementary School

=== Middle schools ===
- Bella Vista Middle School
- Dorothy McElhinney Middle School

=== High schools ===
There are currently no public high schools in French Valley. The closest ones are Chaparral High School for Temecula Valley USD areas, and Vista Murrieta High School for Murrieta Valley USD areas.

=== Other schools ===
- Harvest Hill STEAM Academy (Menifee Union SD)
- Summit Academy, K-8 STEAM Academy (TVUSD)
- Temecula Preparatory School

== See also ==
- French Valley
- French Valley Airport
