= French Valley Airport =

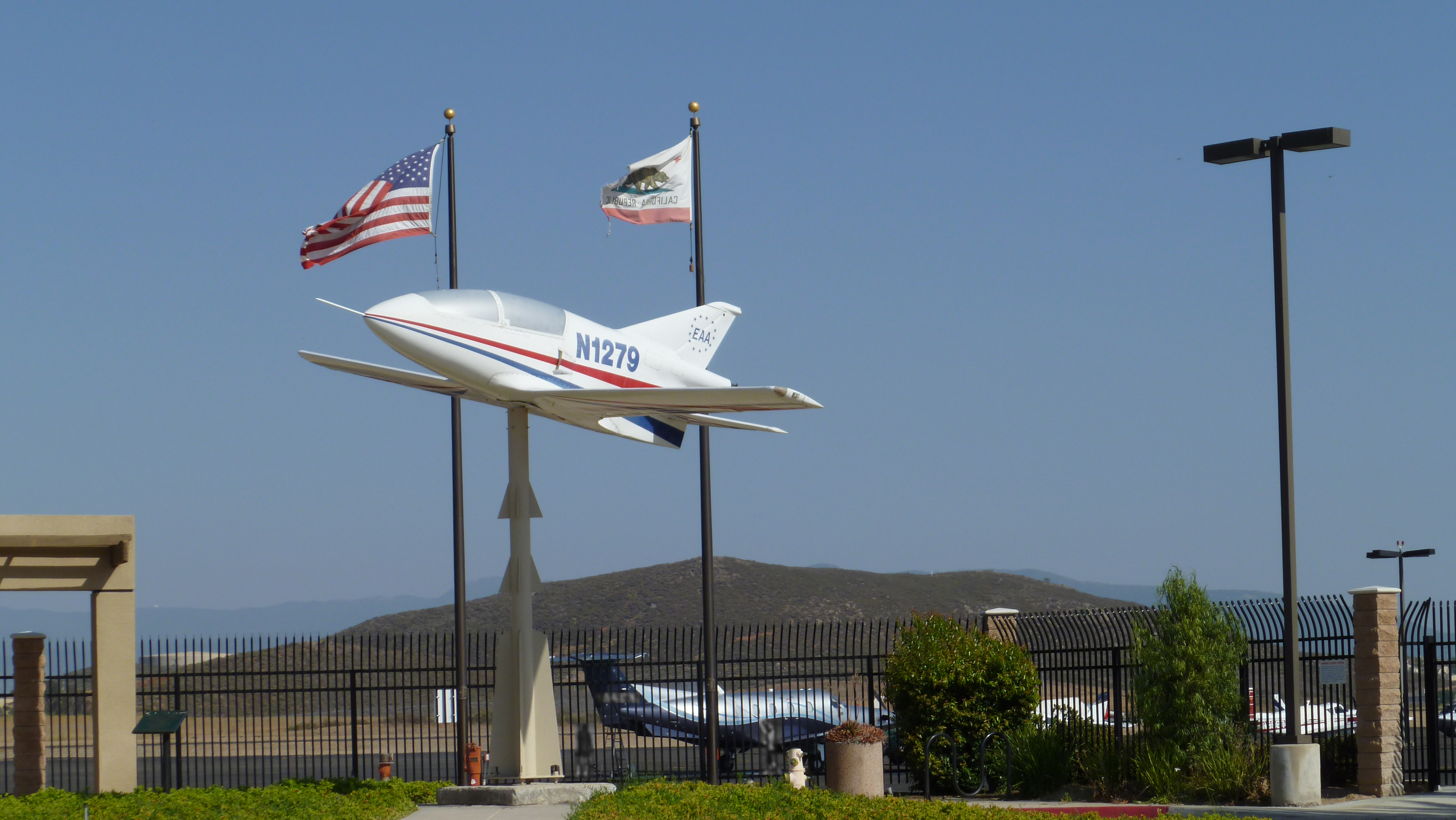
- IATA: RBK; ICAO: none; FAA LID: F70

Summary
- Airport type: Public
- Owner: County of Riverside
- Operator: Riverside County Economic Development Agency
- Serves: Murrieta, Temecula, French Valley, Winchester
- Location: Murrieta
- Opened: July 1989
- Elevation AMSL: 1,350 ft (410 m)
- Coordinates: 33°34′27″N 117°07′43″W
- Website: http://www.rcfva.com/

Maps
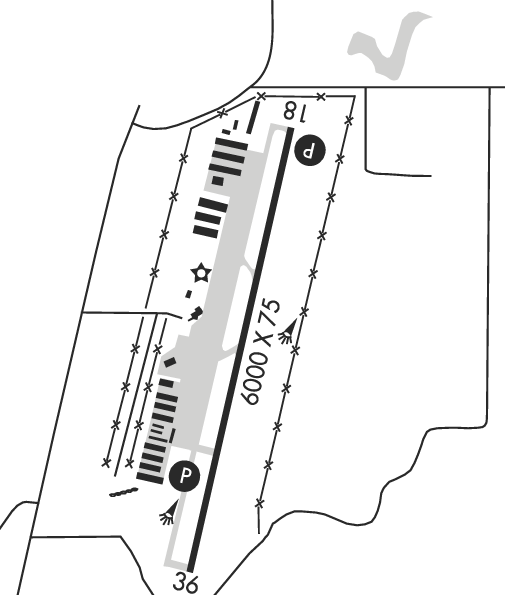
- FAA Airport Sketch

- Location within Southern California

Runways
Direction	Length		Surface
Direction	ft	m	Surface
18/36	6,000	1,829	Asphalt

Statistics (2023)
- Aircraft operations: 89,790
- Based aircraft: 257
- Source: Federal Aviation Administration

French Valley Airport (IATA: RBK, FAA LID: F70) is a county-owned public-use airport in southwestern Riverside County, California, located on Highway 79 near the cities of Murrieta and Temecula.

== Facilities and aircraft ==
French Valley Airport covers an area of 261 acres (106 ha) which contains one asphalt paved runway which is designated as 18/36 and measures 6,000 x 75 ft (1,829 x 23 m).

For the 12-month period ending September 30, 2023, the airport had 89,790 aircraft operations, an average of 246 per day, 100% general aviation, and <1% military. There was at the time 257 aircraft based at this airport: 215 single engine, 30 multi-engine, 2 jet aircraft, and 10 helicopters.

The French Valley Cafe is a popular restaurant on the field which serves three meals a day seven days a week. Best known for breakfast, the cafe also has a full bar with the occasional happy hour. The interior is decorated with air memorabilia and has views overlooking the runway. A patio allows for outdoor service.

There is also the Wings and Rotors Air Museum, with military displays, flyable helicopters and an F-4 Phantom II in restoration to fly.

== Accidents and incidents ==
On July 4, 2023, a Cessna 172 rolled, inverted and crashed into a nearby industrial complex after a failed landing attempt on Runway 18, killing the pilot and injuring 3 passengers. No one on the ground was injured.

On July 8, 2023, 2 pilots and 4 passengers were killed when a Cessna 550 Citation, flying from Harry Reid International Airport, crashed 500 feet short of Runway 18. Low visibility caused by the marine layer that formed over the area could have been a potential factor in the crash. The plane crashed on its second landing attempt after executing a missed approach. Nobody on the ground was injured. The crash caused a fire that burned about an acre of vegetation before it was contained. This was the airport’s second accident within 4 days.
