= Leon, California =

Coordinates: 33°38′29″N 117°6′49″W

Leon is a ghost town in northern San Diego County, California. A former gold mining town from the 1880s, it was named for the Leon Mine that lay on a hill to the northwest of the town. Leon became part of southwestern Riverside County in 1893. Leon had its own post office from May 4, 1888, until July 31, 1911, when its post office was moved to Perris, California.

The site of the former mining town is located south of Winchester in the Domenigoni Valley, on Scott Road just east of Leon Road.

== See also ==
- List of ghost towns in California
