= Temecula Valley Unified School District =

Public school district in Riverside County, California

Address
- 31350 Rancho Vista Road Temecula, California, 92592; United States

District information
- Type: Public
- Grades: K–12
- Established: 1989
- Superintendent: Gary Woods
- School board: Melinda Anderson, Trustee Area 1 Emil Barham, Trustee Area 2 Jennifer Wiersma, Trustee Area 3 Joseph Komrosky, Trustee Area 4 Steven Schwartz, Trustee Area 5
- Chair of the board: President Melinda Anderson, Trustee Area 1
- NCES District ID: 0600028

Students and staff
- Students: 26,491 (2023-2024)
- Teachers: 1,116.83 (FTE)
- Staff: 1,823.52 (FTE)
- Student–teacher ratio: 23.72:1

Other information
- Website: www.tvusd.k12.ca.us

Temecula Valley Unified School District is a school district located in the southwestern portion of Riverside County, California, serving the city of Temecula and unincorporated parts of nearby Murrieta and French Valley. It is the fourth-largest school district in Riverside County by student population. The district's Board of Education elections take place in November of even-numbered years and elected members to serve four-year terms. The Board of Education is composed of five members, elected by geographical districts called Trustee Areas.

== Curriculum selection ==
After a conservative majority were elected to the school board in November 2022, they passed a resolution banning the teaching of critical race theory. In May 2023, the school board rejected social studies textbooks that had been approved by dozens of teachers and parents in a pilot program. The board was concerned that the proposed instructional material mentioned the LGBTQ+ community in material meant for children. It was also concerned about the mention of Harvey Milk, the first openly gay man to be elected to public office in California, calling him a "pedophile." Milk had engaged in a relationship with a 16-year old boy while he was 34, although the age of consent at the time was 16 in New York (where the relationship occurred). The age of consent in California is 18. With the current textbook no longer being printed, it was claimed that classes would be short of books needed by teachers for their students, although California Governor Gavin Newsom announced in July that the state is entering into a contract to secure textbooks for the district in time for the first day of school in August. In July 2023 the district's board of education decided to use the new textbook.

== Policies and incidents ==
In August 2023, the district instituted a parental notification policy that requires district staff to tell parents when their child is requesting to use a name that is different from their legal name or to be identified as a different gender, though this practice was later banned in July 2024 by California Governor Gavin Newsom.

In September 2023, the district passed a policy banning all flags except the U.S. flag and the California flag on TVUSD property, including in classrooms. Trustee Joseph Komrosky claims that "this policy and administrative regulation empowered parents and protected the innocence of the children at TVUSD, by reducing unnecessary political and social activism in the classrooms". Although this policy didn't specifically target the Pride flag, many critics from the LGBTQ+ community believe that this policy is aimed at banning Pride flags. This policy was later reversed in December 2024.

In June 2024, Joseph Komrosky was recalled. Some parents supporting the recall worried that his policies are damaging the community and causing political division. In December 2024, Joseph Komrosky was elected a trustee again.

In October 2026, Steven Schwartz and Emil Barham, two members of the TVUSD governing board, accused Melinda Anderson, another board member, of attempting to spy using a device under their desk. The surveillance video showed her placing an alleged electronic device before the meeting. After the meeting, the surveillance video showed Melinda Anderson retrieving the device.

== Elementary schools ==
- Alamos Elementary
- Ysabel Barnett Elementary
- Crowne Hill Elementary School
- French Valley Elementary
- Helen Hunt Jackson Elementary
- Susan LaVorgna Elementary
- Nicolas Valley Elementary
- Paloma Elementary
- Pauba Valley Elementary
- Rancho Elementary
- Red Hawk Elementary
- Abby Reinke Elementary
- Temecula Elementary
- Temecula Luiseño Elementary
- Tony Tobin Elementary
- Vail Elementary
- Vintage Hills Elementary

== Middle schools ==
- Bella Vista Middle
- James L. Day Middle
- Erle Stanley Gardner Middle
- Margarita Middle
- Temecula Middle
- Vail Ranch Middle

== High schools ==
- Chaparral High School
- Great Oak High School
- Rancho Vista High School
- Susan Nelson High School
- Temecula Valley High School

== Charter schools ==
- Temecula Preparatory School
- Temecula Valley Charter School

== Proposed schools ==
- Old Town Elementary
- High School #4 (French Valley)
- K-8 STEAM Academy

== See also ==
- List of school districts in California by county
