= Black Mountain (Riverside County, California) =

Mountain summit in Riverside County, California

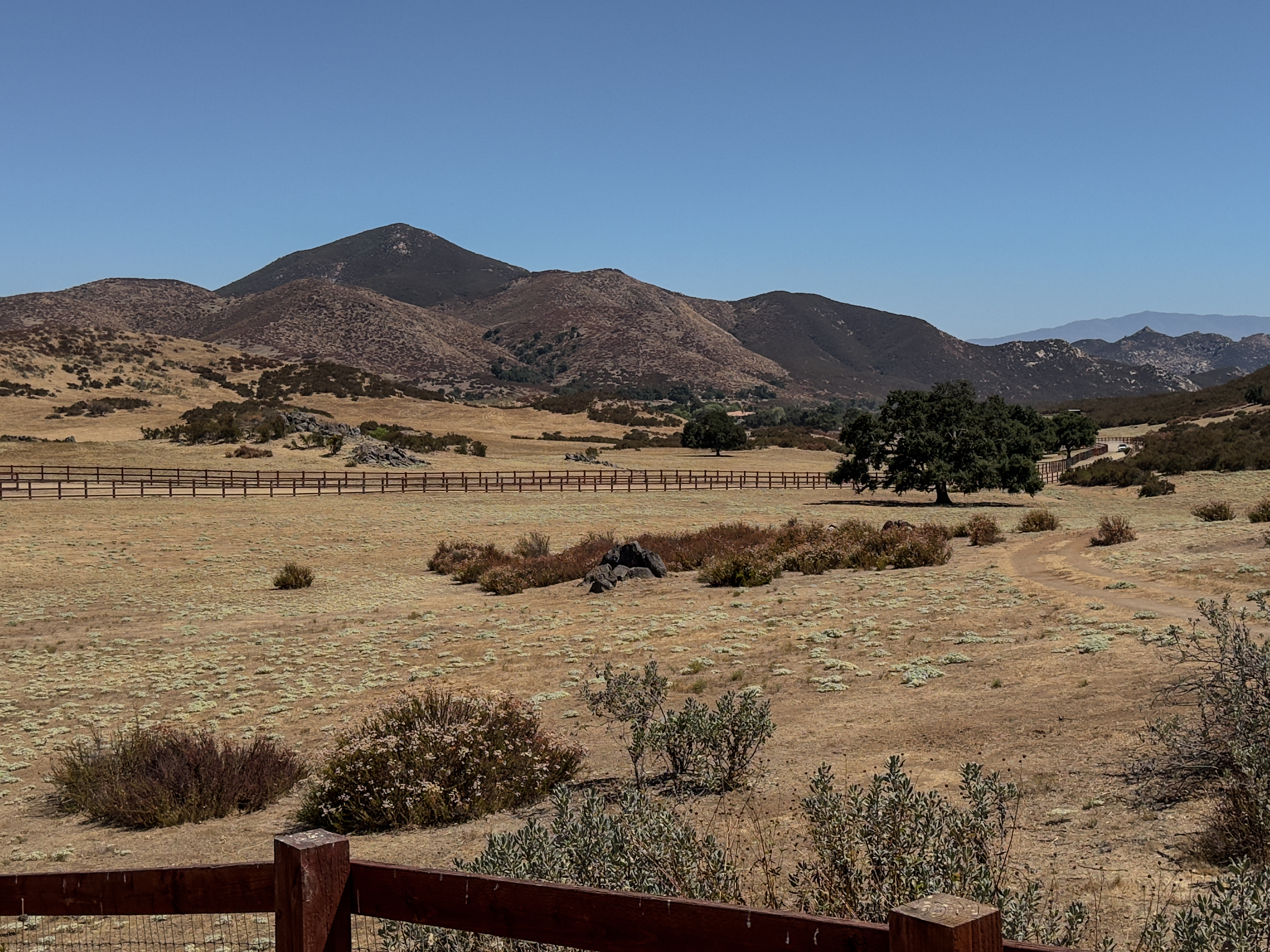
- Black Mountain as viewed from Rawson Road

Highest point
- Elevation: 3,051 ft (930 m)

Geography
- Location within California Location within the United States
- Country: United States
- State: California
- County: Riverside County
- Range coordinates: 33°37′9.20″N 117°0′4.51″W
- Parent range: Peninsular Ranges

Black Mountain is a mountain summit of the Peninsular Ranges System, in Riverside County, California.

== Geography ==
It is located north of the Tucalota Hills, east of Bachelor Mountain, and south of the Rawson Mountains.

== See also ==
- Mountains of Riverside County, California
