= Murrieta Creek =

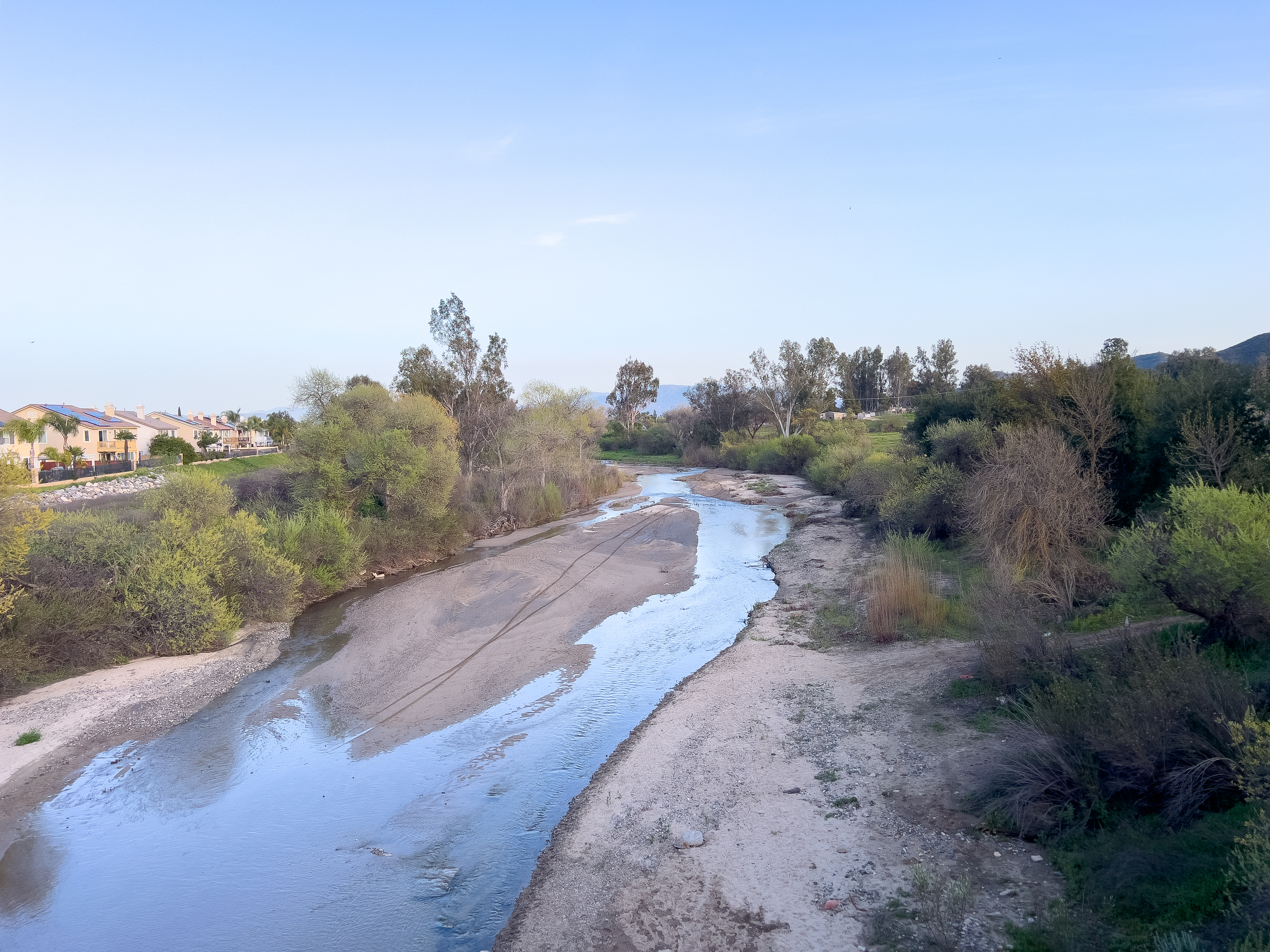

Location
- Country: United States
- State: California
- Region: Riverside County
- District: Wildomar, Murrieta, Temecula
- Cities: Wildomar, Murrieta, Temecula

Physical characteristics
- Source
  - location: at the confluence of the West Fork Murrieta Creek and North Fork Murrieta Creek, Riverside County
  - coordinates: 33°34′46″N 117°14′47″W
  - elevation: 1,173 ft (358 m)
- Mouth: Confluence with Temecula Creek, forming Santa Margarita River
  - location: 0.5 miles southeast of Temecula, Riverside County
  - coordinates: 33°28′28″N 117°08′30″W
  - elevation: 981 ft (299 m)

Basin features
- Tributaries
  - left: West Fork Murrieta Creek or Bear Creek, Cole Creek, Miller Canyon Creek, Linda Rosa Creek
  - right: North Fork Murrieta Creek, Warm Springs Creek, Santa Gertrudis Creek, Waddel Wash, Empire Creek, Arroyo Santiago

Murrieta Creek runs 13 miles (21 km) southeasterly through southwestern Riverside County, California, United States, through the cities of Wildomar, Murrieta, and Temecula, ending 0.5 miles (0.80 km) southeast of the city center of Temecula, where it has its confluence with Temecula Creek and forms the head of the Santa Margarita River.

== History ==
The creek and town of Murrieta are not named for the bandit, Joaquin Murrieta, but for the pioneer sheep ranchers, Izaquel and Juan Murrieta, who purchased the Rancho Pauba and Rancho Temecula Mexican land grants. His brother returned to Spain, but Juan brought 100,000 sheep to the valley in 1873, using the meadows to feed his herd.

== Watershed and course ==
Murrieta Creek drains over 220 square miles (570 km^{2}). The creek has several minor tributaries, including flows from Lake Skinner whose outlet is Tucalota Creek below the reservoir, which then flows to Santa Gertrudis Creek, then Murrieta Creek. Warm Springs Creek is another tributary of Murrieta Creek with its source being in the Domenigoni Valley.
