= Winchester, California =

Winchester
- census-designated place
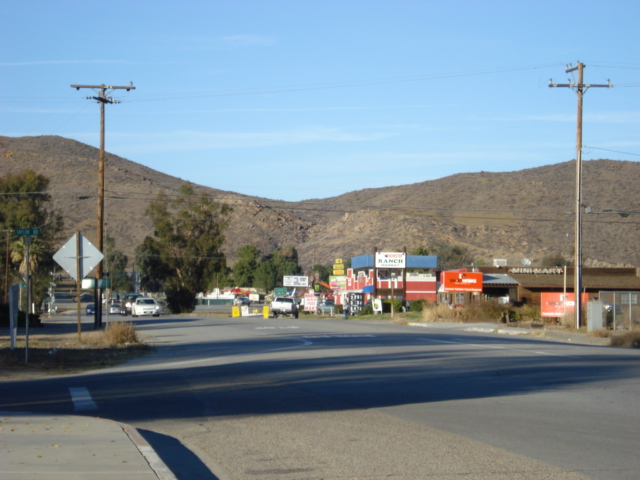
- Winchester, December 2007

- Location in Riverside County and the state of California

- Location in the United States
- Coordinates: 33°42′28″N 117°5′13″W
- Country: United States
- State: California
- County: Riverside

Area
  - Total: 8.010 sq mi (20.746 km^{2})
  - Land: 8.010 sq mi (20.746 km^{2})
  - Water: 0 sq mi (0 km^{2}) 0%
- Elevation: 1,473 ft (449 m)

Population (2020)
  - Total: 3,068
  - Density: 383.0/sq mi (147.9/km^{2})
- Time zone: UTC-8 (PST)
  - Summer (DST): UTC-7 (PDT)
- ZIP code: 92596
- Area code: 951
- FIPS code: 06-85894
- GNIS feature ID: 1652814

Winchester is a census-designated place (CDP) in the Inland Empire region of Riverside County, California, USA. As of the 2020 census, the CDP had a total population of 3,068, up from 2,534 at the 2010 census.

Winchester was founded in 1886 in Pleasant Valley in what was then San Diego County. The town was named after the widow of Horace Winchester, Mrs. Amy Winchester.

Largely rural for most of its history, and home to agricultural businesses including the Winchester Cheese Company, Winchester experienced rapid growth during the housing construction boom in the early-to-mid 2000s. However, construction and growth slowed when the housing bubble burst in 2007, resulting in a housing market correction. The mid-to-late 2010s saw housing prices in Winchester recover and construction continue with new subdivisions, schools, and parks being built.

In 2022, Riverside County expanded the Winchester Planning area to 42 square miles. extending Winchester to the Temecula City limits. In order to meet state requirements for 40 thousand new homes. The City of Temecula is pushing back against the expanded planning area due to traffic concerns. The city of Menifee is pushing back against the expanded community boundary due to desire to annex land west of State route 79

== Geography ==
Winchester is located at 33°42′28″N 117°5′13″W (33.707871, -117.086861).

According to the United States Census Bureau, the CDP has a total area of 8.0 square miles (21 km^{2}), all of it land.

It is approximately 8 miles southwest of the city of Hemet, California.

== Demographics ==
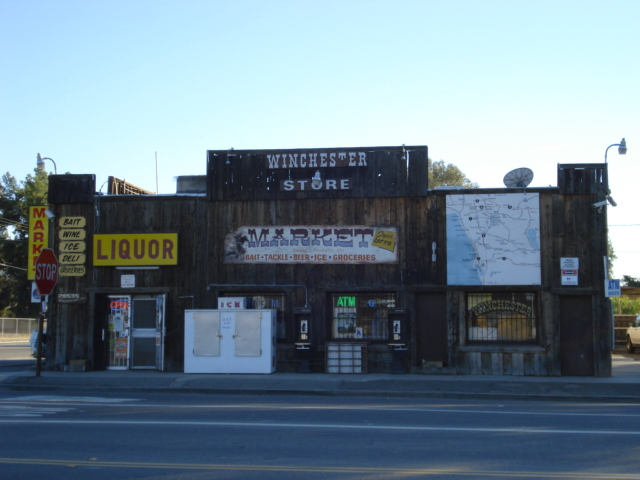
The Winchester Store

Historical population
Census	Pop.	Note	%±
1990	1,689		—
2000	2,155		27.6%
2010	2,534		17.6%
2020	3,068		21.1%
U.S. Decennial Census; 1860–1870 1880-1890; 1900 1910 1920; 1930 1940 1950; 1960 1970 1980; 1990 2000 2010

Winchester first appeared as a census designated place in the 1990 U.S. census.

=== Racial and ethnic composition ===
Winchester CDP, California – Racial and ethnic composition Note: the US Census treats Hispanic/Latino as an ethnic category. This table excludes Latinos from the racial categories and assigns them to a separate category. Hispanics/Latinos may be of any race.
Race / Ethnicity (NH = Non-Hispanic)	Pop 2000	Pop 2010	Pop 2020	% 2000	% 2010	% 2020
White alone (NH)	1,368	1,145	1,035	63.48%	45.19%	33.74%
Black or African American alone (NH)	31	33	76	1.44%	1.30%	2.48%
Native American or Alaska Native alone (NH)	14	12	10	0.65%	0.47%	0.33%
Asian alone (NH)	7	43	123	0.32%	1.70%	4.01%
Native Hawaiian or Pacific Islander alone (NH)	2	2	8	0.09%	0.08%	0.26%
Other race alone (NH)	0	2	8	0.00%	0.08%	0.26%
Mixed race or Multiracial (NH)	56	64	94	2.60%	2.53%	3.06%
Hispanic or Latino (any race)	677	1,233	1,714	31.42%	48.66%	55.87%
Total	2,155	2,534	3,068	100.00%	100.00%	100.00%

=== 2020 census ===
As of the 2020 census, Winchester had a population of 3,068, all of whom lived in households. The population density was 383.0 inhabitants per square mile (147.9/km^{2}).

The age distribution was 25.2% under the age of 18, 8.5% aged 18 to 24, 27.2% aged 25 to 44, 24.9% aged 45 to 64, and 14.2% aged 65 or older. The median age was 36.0 years. For every 100 females, there were 103.2 males, and for every 100 females age 18 and over, there were 108.1 males age 18 and over.

There were 958 households, of which 40.9% had children under the age of 18 living in them. Of all households, 50.9% were married-couple households, 21.6% were households with a male householder and no spouse or partner present, and 18.5% were households with a female householder and no spouse or partner present. About 15.2% of households were made up of individuals, and 6.9% had someone living alone who was 65 years of age or older. The average household size was 3.2. There were 754 families (78.7% of all households).

There were 1,028 housing units at an average density of 128.3 units per square mile (49.5 units/km^{2}), of which 6.8% were vacant and 958 (93.2%) were occupied. Of occupied units, 74.7% were owner-occupied and 25.3% were occupied by renters. The homeowner vacancy rate was 1.8%, and the rental vacancy rate was 8.7%.

0.0% of residents lived in urban areas, while 100.0% lived in rural areas.

Racial composition as of the 2020 census
Race	Number	Percent
White	1,288	42.0%
Black or African American	86	2.8%
American Indian and Alaska Native	52	1.7%
Asian	125	4.1%
Native Hawaiian and Other Pacific Islander	9	0.3%
Some other race	953	31.1%
Two or more races	555	18.1%

=== Income and poverty ===
In 2023, the US Census Bureau estimated that the median household income was $75,353, and the per capita income was $23,904. About 0.0% of families and 4.0% of the population were below the poverty line.

=== 2010 census ===
At the 2010 census Winchester had a population of 2,534. The population density was 327.7 inhabitants per square mile (126.5/km^{2}). The racial makeup of Winchester was 1,577 (62.2%) White, 38 (1.5%) African American, 17 (0.7%) Native American, 46 (1.8%) Asian, 2 (0.1%) Pacific Islander, 728 (28.7%) from other races, and 126 (5.0%) from two or more races. Hispanic or Latino of any race were 1,233 persons (48.7%).

The whole population lived in households, no one lived in non-institutionalized group quarters and no one was institutionalized.

There were 769 households, 326 (42.4%) had children under the age of 18 living in them, 425 (55.3%) were opposite-sex married couples living together, 94 (12.2%) had a female householder with no husband present, 53 (6.9%) had a male householder with no wife present. There were 54 (7.0%) unmarried opposite-sex partnerships, and 6 (0.8%) same-sex married couples or partnerships. 149 households (19.4%) were one person and 71 (9.2%) had someone living alone who was 65 or older. The average household size was 3.30. There were 572 families (74.4% of households); the average family size was 3.78.

The age distribution was 762 people (30.1%) under the age of 18, 218 people (8.6%) aged 18 to 24, 613 people (24.2%) aged 25 to 44, 649 people (25.6%) aged 45 to 64, and 292 people (11.5%) who were 65 or older. The median age was 34.6 years. For every 100 females, there were 102.6 males. For every 100 females age 18 and over, there were 104.4 males.

There were 850 housing units at an average density of 109.9 per square mile, of the occupied units 491 (63.8%) were owner-occupied and 278 (36.2%) were rented. The homeowner vacancy rate was 4.3%; the rental vacancy rate was 5.4%. 1,514 people (59.7% of the population) lived in owner-occupied housing units and 1,020 people (40.3%) lived in rental housing units.

== Education ==
It is in the Hemet Unified School District.

== Parks and Recreation ==
Parks in Winchester are owned and operated by Valley-Wide Recreation & Park District

== Transportation ==
Winchester is served by the Riverside Transit Agency

== Surrounding communities ==
- French Valley
- Murrieta
- Menifee
- Hemet
- Homeland
- Temecula

== Notable residents ==
- Sgt. Janek Pawel Pietrzak and his wife, Quiana Faye Jenkins-Pietrzak, 2008 murder victims.
- Adam Yahiye Gadahn, spokesman for al-Qaeda and adviser to Osama bin Laden, spent his childhood living on the family's farm in Winchester.

== Politics ==
In the California State Legislature, Winchester is in the 32nd senatorial district, represented by Republican Kelly Seyarto, and the 36th Assembly district, represented by Republican Jeff Gonzalez.

In the United States House of Representatives, Winchester is in California's 25th congressional district, represented by Democrat Raul Ruiz.
