= Bachelor Mountain (Riverside County) =

Mountain summit in Riverside County, California

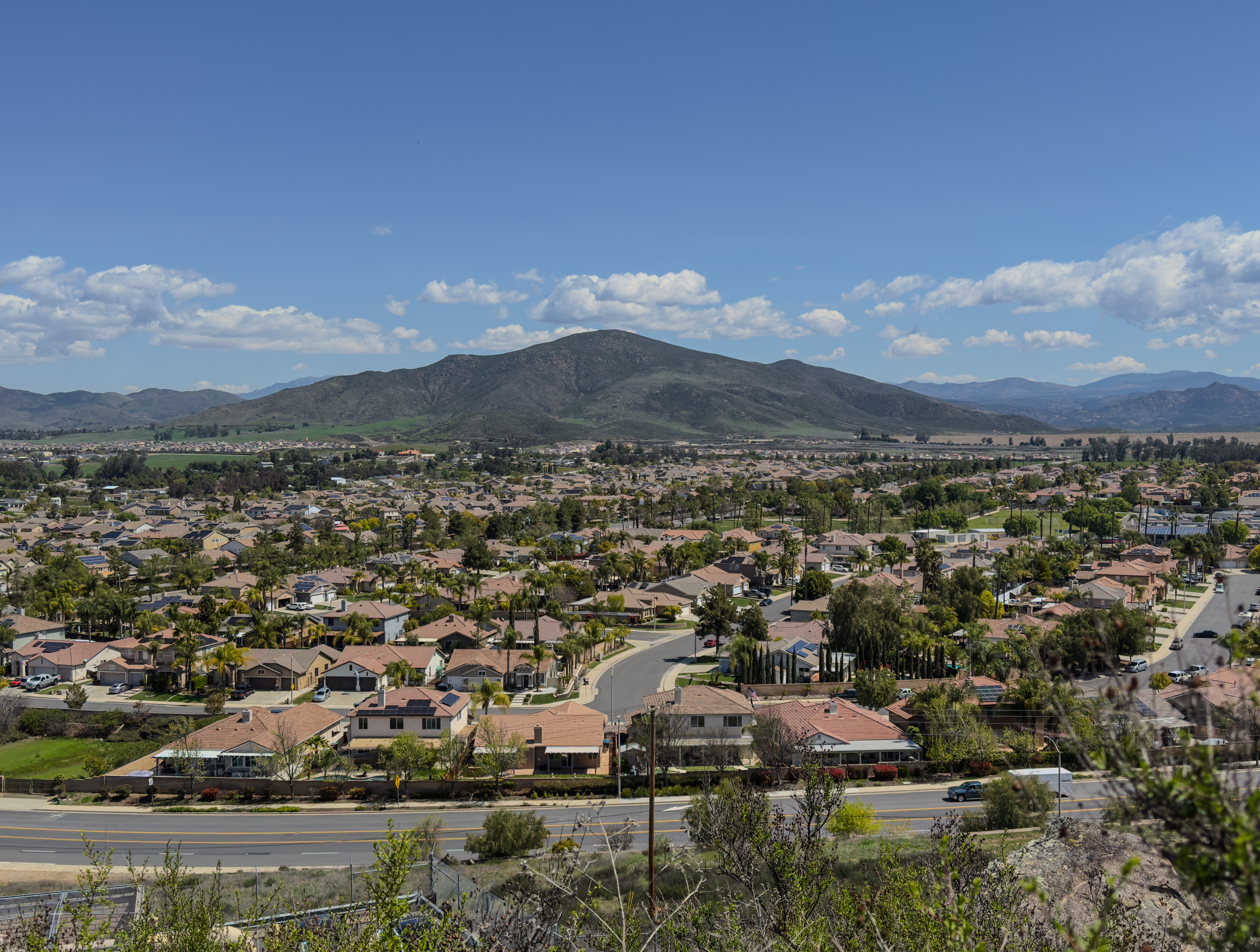
- Bachelor Mountain and French Valley, California

Highest point
- Elevation: 2,543 ft (775 m)

Geography
- Location within California Location within the United States
- Country: United States
- State: California
- County: Riverside County
- Range coordinates: 33°36′19.78″N 117°3′43.98″W
- Parent range: Peninsular Ranges

Bachelor Mountain is a mountain summit of the Peninsular Ranges System, in Riverside County, California.

== Geography ==
Bachelor Mountain is located on the north side of Lake Skinner. It lies west of Black Mountain and south of the Rawson Mountains.

== See also ==
- Mountains of Riverside County, California
