= Tucalota Hills =

Low mountain range in Riverside County, California

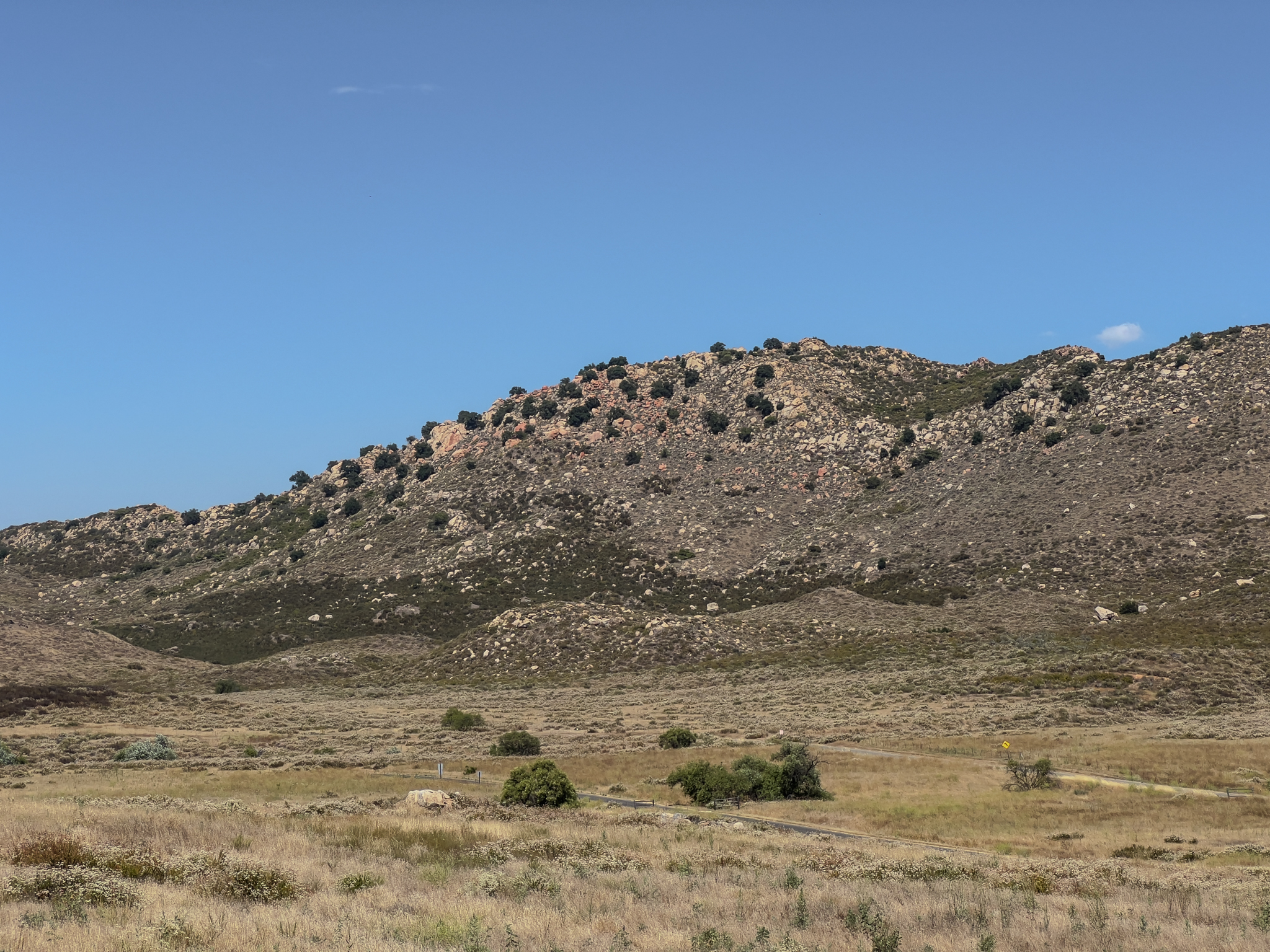
- Tucalota Hills near the entrance of Lake Skinner Recreational Reserve

Highest point
- Elevation: 2,477 ft (755 m)

Geography
- Location within California Location within the United States
- Country: United States
- State: California
- Region: Peninsular Ranges
- District: Riverside County
- Range coordinates: 33°35′39.49″N 117°00′5.77″W
- Topo map: USGS Tucalota Hills

The Tucalota Hills are a low mountain range of the Peninsular Ranges System, in Riverside County, California.

== Geography ==
They are located east of Lake Skinner reservoir, southwest of Hemet, northeast of Temecula.

Diamond Valley reservoir fills a basin in their northwestern area.

The San Jacinto Mountains are to the northeast, and Santa Ana Mountains to the west.

== See also ==
- Mountain ranges of Riverside County, California
