= Skinner Reservoir =

- Lake Skinner
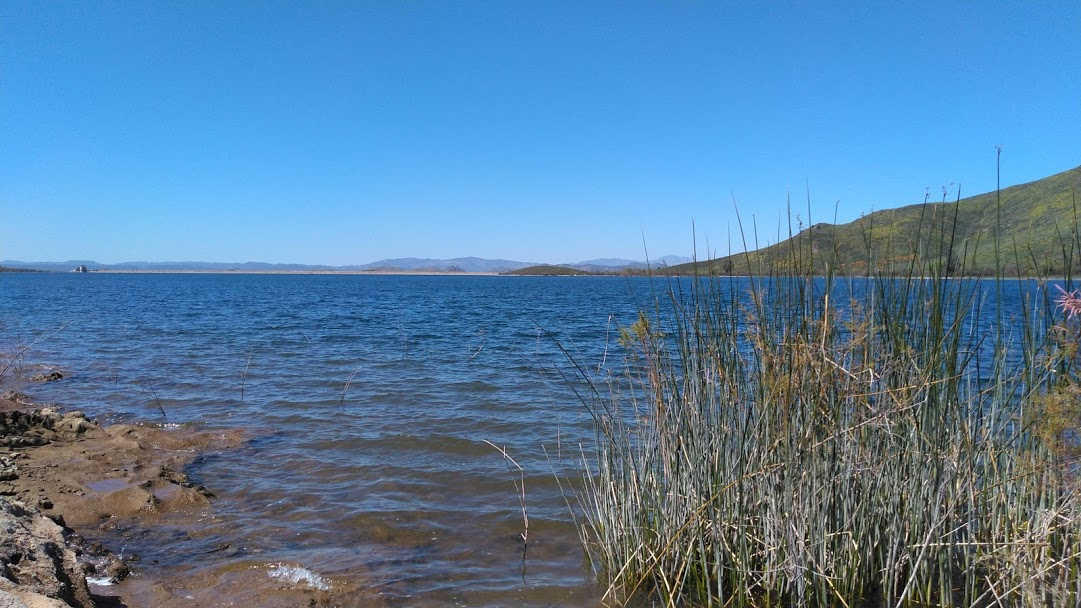

- Location within California Location within the United States
- Location: Riverside County, California
- Coordinates: 33°35′18″N 117°03′24″W
- Type: reservoir
- Primary inflows: Colorado River Aqueduct, State Water Project
- Basin countries: United States
- Managing agency: Riverside County Parks
- Water volume: 54.4×10^{6} m^{3} (44,100 acre⋅ft)
- Surface elevation: 457.2 m (1,500 ft)
- Website: www.rivcoparks.org/lake-skinner-recreation-area

Skinner Reservoir, also known as Lake Skinner, is a reservoir in western Riverside County, California, located at the foot of Bachelor Mountain in the Auld Valley, approximately 10 miles (16 km) northeast of Temecula. It was created in 1973 by the construction of the Skinner Clearwell Dam (expanded 1991) on Tucalota Creek, and currently has a capacity of 44,200 acre-feet (54,500,000 m^{3}). Located north of Rancho California Road near the Temecula Valley Wine Country, The address of the reservoir is: 37701 Warren Road, Temecula, CA 92592.

Lake Skinner is operated by the Riverside County Regional Park and Open-Space District (RivCo Parks), under lease by the Metropolitan Water District of Southern California. It is supplied by the Colorado River Aqueduct and the State Water Project, and feeds the Robert A. Skinner filtration plant, which provides treated water to 2.5 million people in Riverside and San Diego Counties. It is named after Robert A. Skinner, general manager of the Metropolitan Water District from 1962 to 1967, who was instrumental in negotiating Metropolitan's contract with the California Department of Water Resources for delivery of water from Northern California.

Lake Skinner is a popular recreation area, featuring sailing, fishing, swimming (in an off-reservoir swimming area), horseback riding and hiking. The Lake Skinner recreational area includes 1,400 acres (5.7 km^{2}) of surface water and 300 acres (1.2 km^{2}) of lakeside parkland, features 158 RV sites and 300 developed campsites, and is the site of the annual Temecula Valley Balloon & Wine Festival and the Solar Cup competition.

The reservoir was formed by construction of a dam on Tucalota Creek, along with two minor creeks named Middle Creek and Schoolhouse Creek. Tucalota Creek below the reservoir flows to Santa Gertrudis Creek, then Murrieta Creek, then to the Santa Margarita River and ultimately to the Pacific Ocean.

== Ecology ==
The reservoir and nearby Southwestern Riverside County Multi-Species Reserve host endangered species such as Least Bell's vireo (Vireo bellii pusillis) and Southwestern willow flycatcher (Empidonax traillii extimus), dependent on riparian willow habitat that is created and maintained by North American beaver (Castor canadensis).

== See also ==
- List of dams and reservoirs in California
- List of lakes in California
