= Santa Margarita River =

River in California, United States of America

Santa Margarita River Temecula River
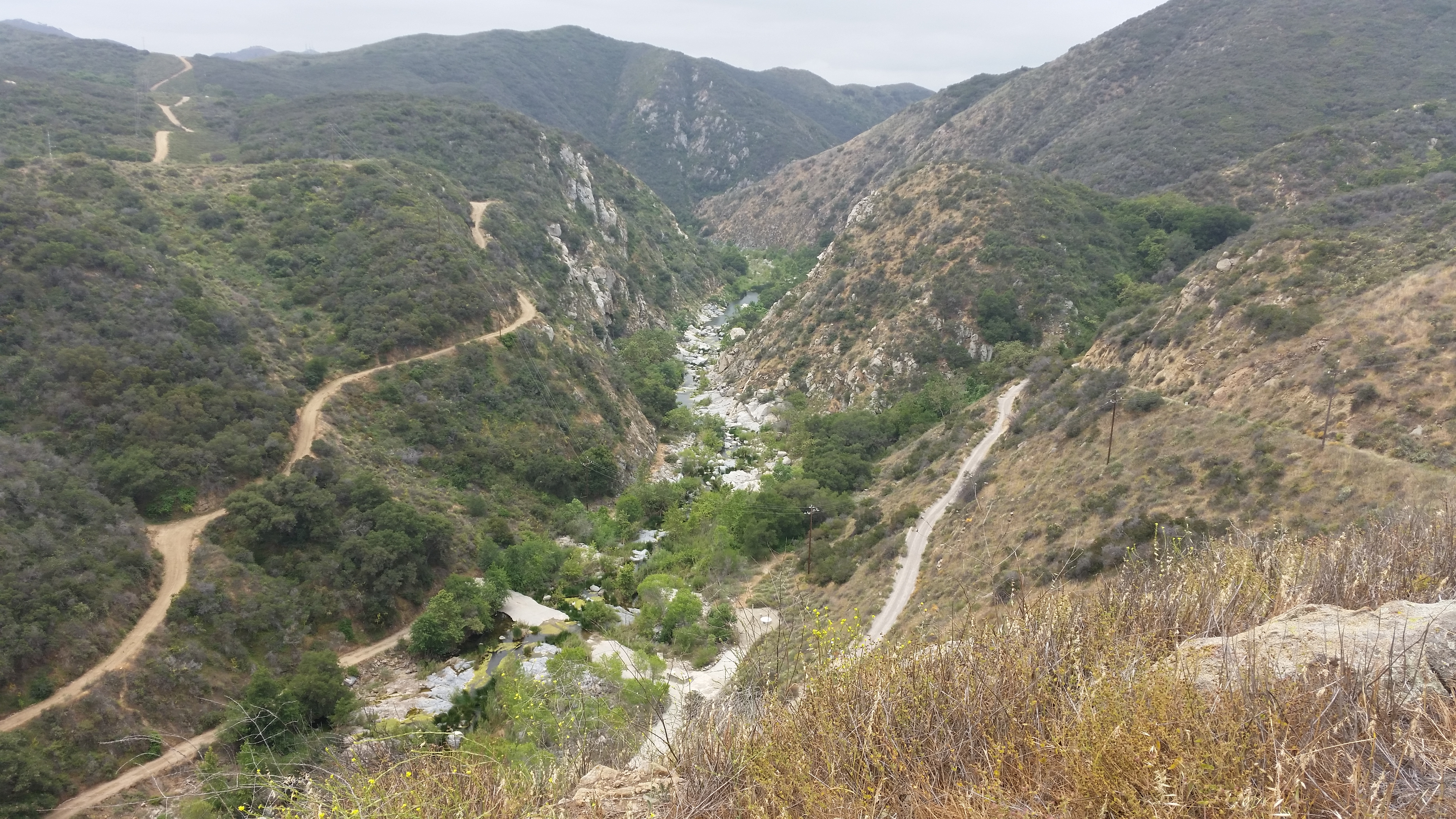
- Mouth of the Santa Margarita River

- Location of mouth

Location
- Country: United States
- State: California

Physical characteristics
- Source: Confluence of Temecula Creek and Murrieta Creek
  - location: Temecula, Riverside County
  - coordinates: 33°28′27″N 117°08′26″W
  - elevation: 950 ft (290 m)
- Mouth: Pacific Ocean
  - location: Camp Pendleton Marine Corps Base, San Diego County
  - coordinates: 33°13′55″N 117°24′58″W
  - elevation: 7 ft (2.1 m)
- Length: 31 mi (50 km)
- Basin size: 723 sq mi (1,870 km^{2})
- Discharge
  - location: Ysidora
  - average: 34.2 cu ft/s (0.97 m^{3}/s)
  - minimum: 0 cu ft/s (0 m^{3}/s)
  - maximum: 44,000 cu ft/s (1,200 m^{3}/s)

Basin features
- Tributaries
  - left: Temecula Creek, Rainbow Creek, Pueblitos Canyon
  - right: Murrieta Creek, Sandia Creek, De Luz Creek, Wood Canyon, Newton Canyon

The Santa Margarita River is an approximately 30.9 mi (49.7 km) intermittent river on the Pacific coast of Southern California in the United States. One of the last free-flowing rivers in Southern California, it drains an arid region at the southern end of the Santa Ana Mountains, in the Peninsular Ranges between Los Angeles and San Diego.

The combination of what is now Temecula Creek and today's Santa Margarita River was formerly known as the Temecula River,

== History ==
The Portolà expedition camped on the river on July 20, 1769, and named it for Saint Margaret of Antioch. A Santa Margarita rancheria is mentioned in 1795 and there is a February 23, 1836 land grant called Santa Margarita y San Onofre (later renamed Rancho Santa Margarita y Las Flores).

In 1881 the California Southern Railroad followed the route of the river. When the route was completed, it had 241 bridges crossing the river. While it was operating, Chinese Americans worked on the railroad. The route along the river was abandoned in 1891.

In the early 20th century, following a lawsuit against Vail Ranch in Temecula, water was guaranteed for the river to continue to flow. During much of the 20th century, and into the early 21st century, the river was the subject of a long-running water rights battle between the United States Navy and the Fallbrook Public Utility District. In August 2018, the Fallbrook Public Utility District sold its land on the river, ending its over 60-year plan to place a hydroelectric dam on the river; it will be preserved by the Wildlands Conservancy as the Santa Margarita River Trail Preserve, which utilized funds from bonds authorized by Proposition 68 to purchase the land.

== Watershed and course ==
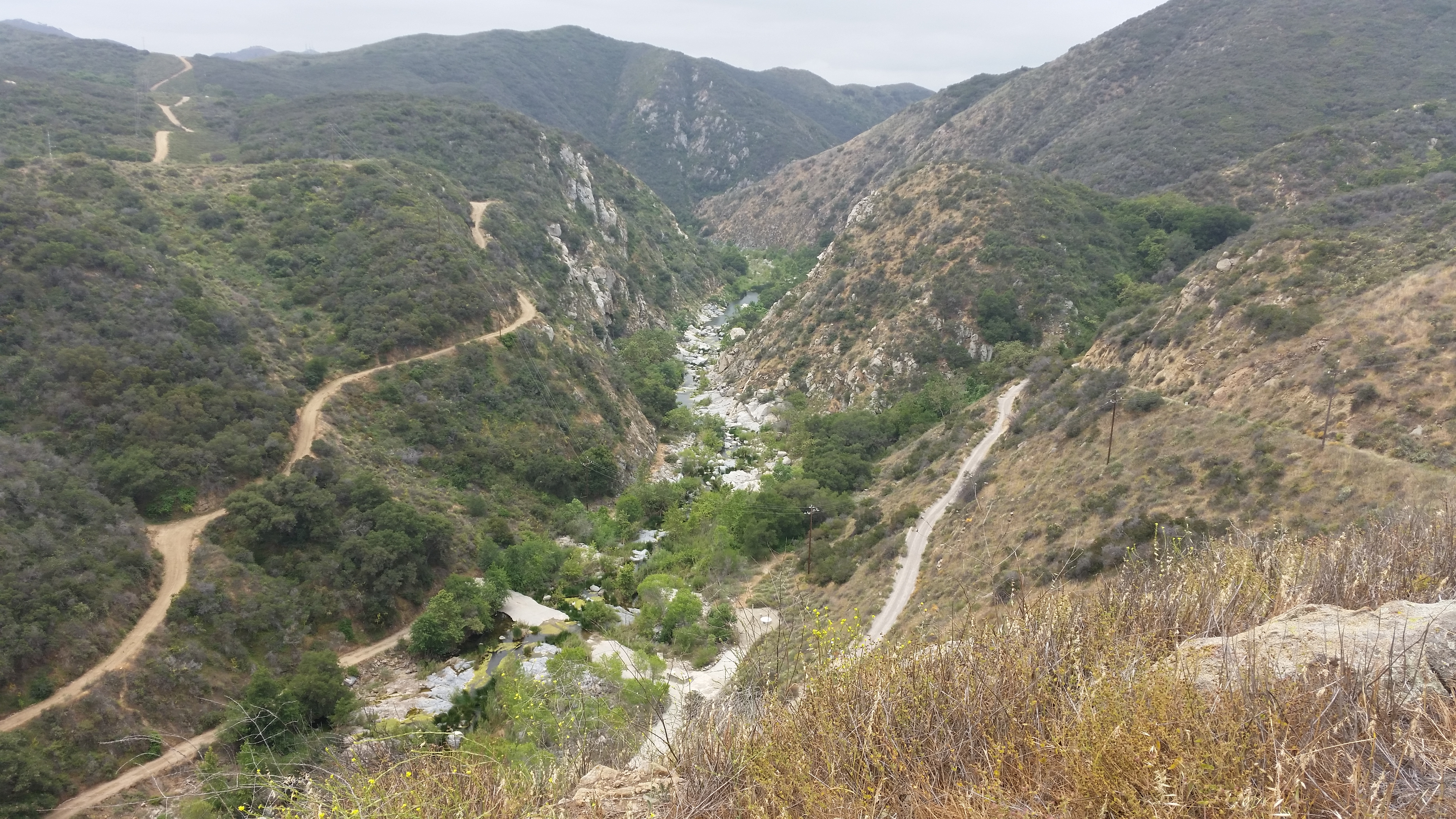
Temecula Canyon

The mainstem of the Santa Margarita River begins at the confluence of Temecula Creek and Murrieta Creek, in southwestern Riverside County, east of Interstate 15, 0.5 miles (0.80 km) southeast of Temecula. The river is formed when the two creeks merge. It flows southwest through the 5 miles (8.0 km) Temecula Canyon at the south end of the Santa Ana Mountains. Along its lower 10 miles (16 km) the river forms a large floodplain as it crosses Camp Pendleton Marine Corps Base. It enters the Gulf of Santa Catalina on the Pacific approximately 3 miles (4.8 km) northwest of Oceanside.

Draining 1,922 square kilometres (742 sq mi), the Santa Margarita Watershed is the second largest river basin on the Southern California coastal plain. The upper watershed consists of the 575 square kilometres (222 sq mi) Murrieta Creek subwatershed and the 948 square kilometres (366 sq mi) Temecula Creek subwatershed. Although there are two dams in the upper watershed, both dams must release water that roughly corresponds to natural flows in the tributaries that they are on. As a result, the flow of water in the Santa Margarita River is very close to what it would be in the absence of those two dams.

Below the confluence of Murrieta and Temecula Creeks, the primary tributaries of the Santa Margarita River mainstem are Rainbow Creek on the left (headingdownstream) and Sandia Creek and De Luz Creeks on the right. The two latter creeks drain the Santa Rosa Plateau.

== Conservation and ecology ==
Approximately 4,334 acres (1,754 ha) of the middle course of the Santa Margarita River in Temecula Canyon are managed by San Diego State University as the Santa Margarita Ecological Reserve, a collaboration of the Bureau of Land Management, California Department of Fish and Wildlife and The Nature Conservancy. The Nature Conservancy has identified and continues to acquire land along the river for conservation. Downstream from the Ecological Preserve the river flows through The Wildlands Conservancy Santa Margarita River Trail Preserve, and empties into the Ocean through the largely undisturbed lands of Camp Pendleton. Thus the mainstem flows through undeveloped, protected lands. The river has unusual habitats with the upper mainstem one of the few remaining natural gorge rivers in Southern California and the lower mainstem has expansive riparian strips, some up to 1.5 kilometres (0.93 mi) across.

Approximately 70 species of special concern (rare, threatened, or endangered) regularly inhabit the watershed, including 30 that are currently protected under the Endangered Species Act. Two federally endangered riparian birds are the least Bell's vireo (Vireo bellii pusillus) and the southwestern willow flycatcher (Emmpidonax traillii extimus)), both of which require riparian habitat for breeding success.

Major fishes in the Santa Margarita River include the rainbow trout (Oncorhynchus mykiss), arroyo chub (Gila orcuttii), California killifish (Fundulus parvipinnis), striped mullet, longjaw mudsucker, staghorn sculpin. Pacific lamprey (Entosphenus tridentatus) recolonized the river in August 2019 for the first time since 1940, the furthest south the species has currently recolonized, 260 miles (420 km) south of the previous location in San Luis Obispo which recolonized in 2017. The successful recolonization has been attributed to a rebuilt weir and new fishway at Camp Pendleton which allowed the lamprey to find passage into the river. Aquatic and semi-aquatic mammals include California golden beaver (Castor canadensis subauratus), muskrat, raccoon and long-tailed weasel. Contemporary beaver populations survive at the headwaters of the Santa Margarita River at the confluence of Temecula Creek and Murrieta Creek.

Major riparian plants include arroyo, black, narrowleaf, Pacific, and red willow (Salix spp); California sycamore (Platanus racemosa), Fremont cottonwood (Populus fremontii), mulefat (Baccharis salicifolia) and White alder (Alnus rhombifolia).
