= Hamilton Creek (Cahuilla Creek tributary) =

Stream in the American state of California

Hamilton Creek is a tributary stream of Cahuilla Creek, (itself a tributary of Wilson Creek, Temecula Creek, and the Santa Margarita River), in Riverside County, California. Its mouth is found in the Anza Valley at an elevation of 3,865 feet (1,178 m). Its source is at 33°32′46″N 116°34′36″W at an elevation of 4,800 feet on the southwest facing slope of Lookout Mountain in the Santa Rosa Mountains.

== History ==
Hamilton Creek was named after Jim Hamilton, an African American man who settled there after he lost his farm in Butterfield Valley after losing a lawsuit over ownership of the Rancho Pauba in the early 1880s. Hamilton moved out to the lands of the Cahuilla, where he and two of his sons raised cattle at their ranch in the Anza Valley, which was first known as the Hamilton Plain. Hamilton School in Anza was also named after him.
