= Pauba Valley =

Valley in Riverside County, California

Pauba Valley is a valley along the course of Temecula Creek, in Riverside County, California.

It heads to the east at 33°30′06″N 117°00′10″W, the mouth of the gorge of Temecula Creek Canyon at the foot of Oak Mountain. Its mouth in the west is at an elevation of 1,014 feet (309 m), where it joins the Elsinore Trough at the confluence of Wolf Valley and Temecula Valley. The valley is bounded on the north and southwest by hills of the ancient eroding sediments of the Temecula Basin and on the northeast and southeast by Oak Mountain.
