= Elsinore Valley =

Valley in California, United States

Coordinates: 33°37′30″N 117°18′30″W

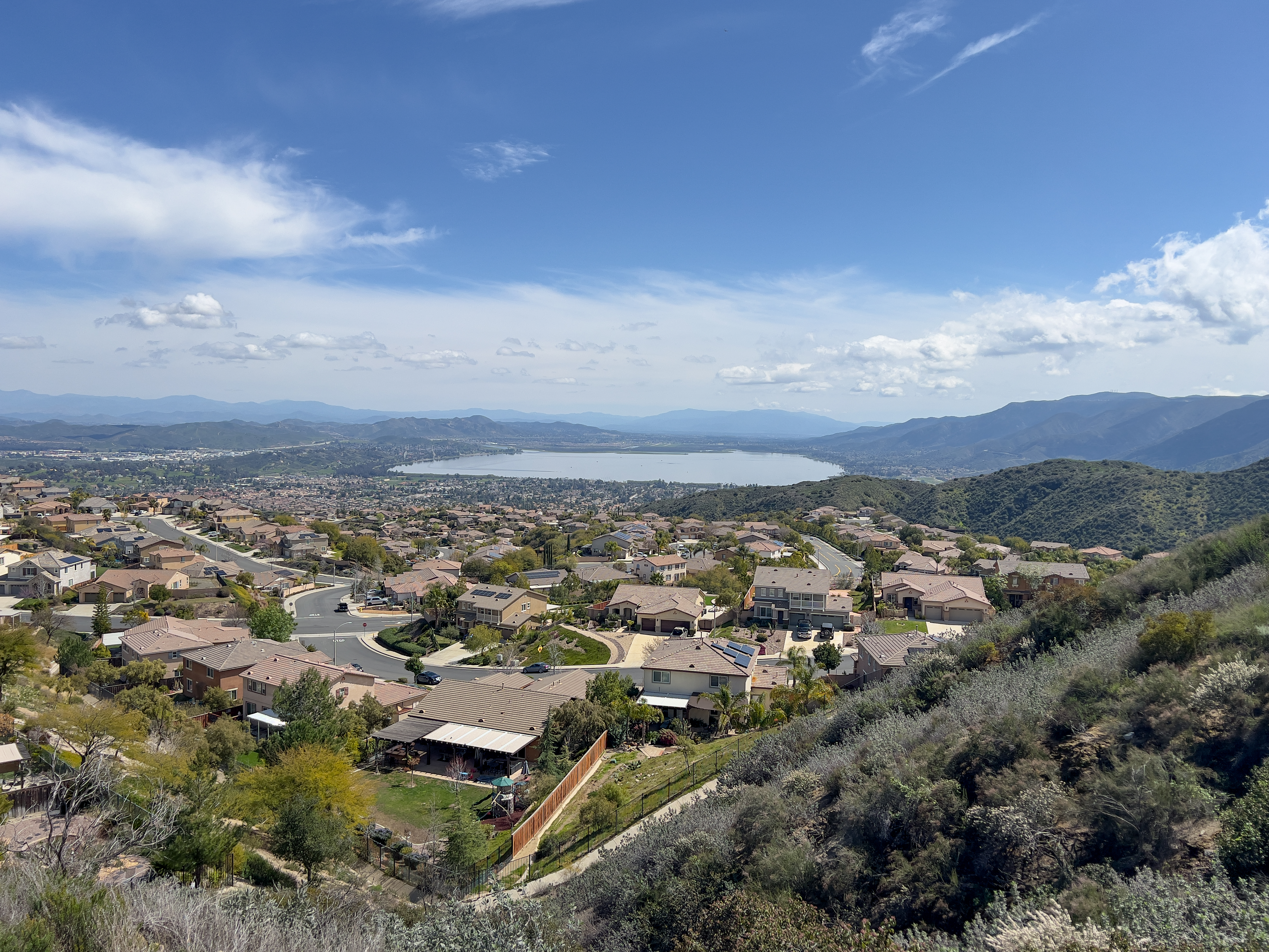
Elsinore Valley looking south from hills of North Elsinore

The Elsinore Valley is a graben rift valley in western Riverside County, California, a part of the Elsinore Trough: a complex graben between the Santa Ana Block to the southwest and the Perris Block on the northeast, divided into several smaller sections by transverse faults.

The Elsinore Valley graben is bounded on its northeast side by the Glen Ivy longitudinal fault on the north shore of Lake Elsinore, at the foot of the Clevelin Hills. It is bounded on the southwest by the Willard Fault, which runs southeastward along the south shore of Lake Elsinore, at the foot of the Santa Ana Mountains, towards Rome Hill. The Willard Fault continues along the western side of the Temecula Valley and Wolf Valley grabens. At the south end of Lake Elsinore, the Wildomar Fault enters the lake just east of Rome Hill. From there, it runs southeast on the northeastern side of the Temecula Valley.

The Elsinore Valley is marked in the south by the rise between the Elsinore and Temecula Valley. In the north, the valley bounds are marked by the Los Pinos and Lucerne transverse faults, extending eastward from ridges of the Santa Ana Mountains; these faults divide the Elsinore Valley from the Temescal Valley graben.
