= Cahuilla Mountain =

Mountain summit in Riverside County, California

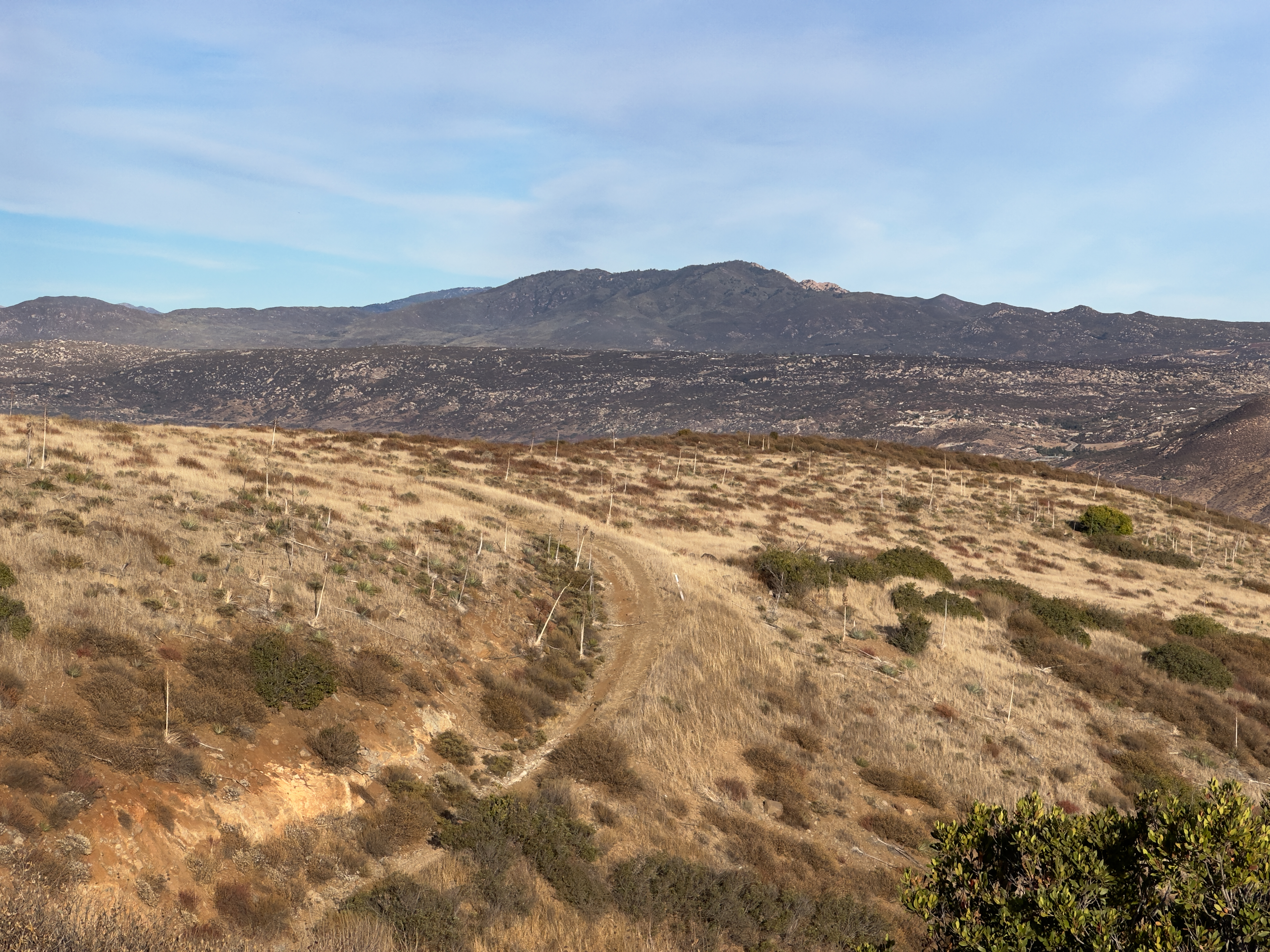
- A view of Cahuilla Mountain from Oak Mountain

Highest point
- Elevation: 5,611 ft (1,710 m)

Geography
- Location within California Location within the United States
- Country: United States
- State: California
- County: Riverside County
- Range coordinates: 33°34′25.46″N 116°46′57.87″W
- Parent range: Peninsular Ranges

Cahuilla Mountain is a mountain summit of the Peninsular Ranges System, in Riverside County, California.

== Geography ==
Cahuilla Mountain forms the northwestern boundary of the Anza Valley. Bautista Canyon lies in between Cahuilla Mountain and Thomas Mountain.

== See also ==
- Mountains of Riverside County, California
