= Butterfield Valley =

Valley in the American state of California

Butterfield Valley is a valley along the course of Temecula Creek, in Riverside County, California. Its lower end is now filled by Vail Lake. It heads at 33°27′39″N 116°55′34″W and its mouth is at the site of the Vail Lake Dam at the head of the deep canyon Temecula Creek has cut through Oak Mountain to the Pauba Valley.

== History ==
The original name of Butterfield Valley, found on the first topographic map of the region, was "N*gger Valley" and was not renamed by the U. S. Geological Survey until 1970. It was named after Jim Hamilton, an African American man who settled there as a squatter on the east end of the Rancho Pauba in the later 1860s. The 1870 census of Temecula showed James Hamilton was a 49-year-old widower, living on a 160-acre farm with his four children. The farm was evaluated at $5,000, more than the value of other similar farms in the area. Eventually Hamilton lost this land in a lawsuit over ownership of the Rancho Pauba in the early 1880s.

However, Hamilton moved out to the lands of the Cahuilla, where he and two of his sons continued to raise cattle at their ranch in the Anza Valley, which was first known as the Hamilton Plain. Hamilton Creek, originating east of Anza, still bears his name. Hamilton School in Anza was also named after him. The school has been divided into a K-8 School and Hamilton High School since 2006–2007.

Hamilton was married to a Native American woman and had three sons. Two became U. S. Marshals, and one was killed in the line of duty at San Jacinto, California. The two surviving sons also married native women.
