= Wolf Valley =

Graben rift valley in Riverside County, California, United States

Wolf Valley is a graben rift valley in the Elsinore Trough, in western Riverside County, California.

== Overview ==
Wolf Valley is the southernmost of the graben valleys making up the Elsinore Trough, created by the Elsinore Fault Zone. It lies between the Wildomar Fault on the east, at the foot of the Temecula Basin and the Willard Fault on the west, at the foot of the Santa Ana Mountains. Wolf Valley lies south of Temecula Creek. The southern end of the graben valley is where the Elsinore Fault Zone changes the direction of strike along the southern side of Agua Tibia Mountain, northeast of Pala Mountain.

The valley is drained by Pechanga Creek and its tributaries, itself a tributary of the Santa Margarita River.

The Pechanga Indian Reservation and part of the city of Temecula are located in this valley.

- Head of Wolf Valley 33°26′38″N 117°03′46″W
- Mouth of Wolf Valley 33°28′26″N 117°07′03″W
