= Elsinore Trough =

Valley in California, United States

Coordinates: 33°41′N 117°22′W

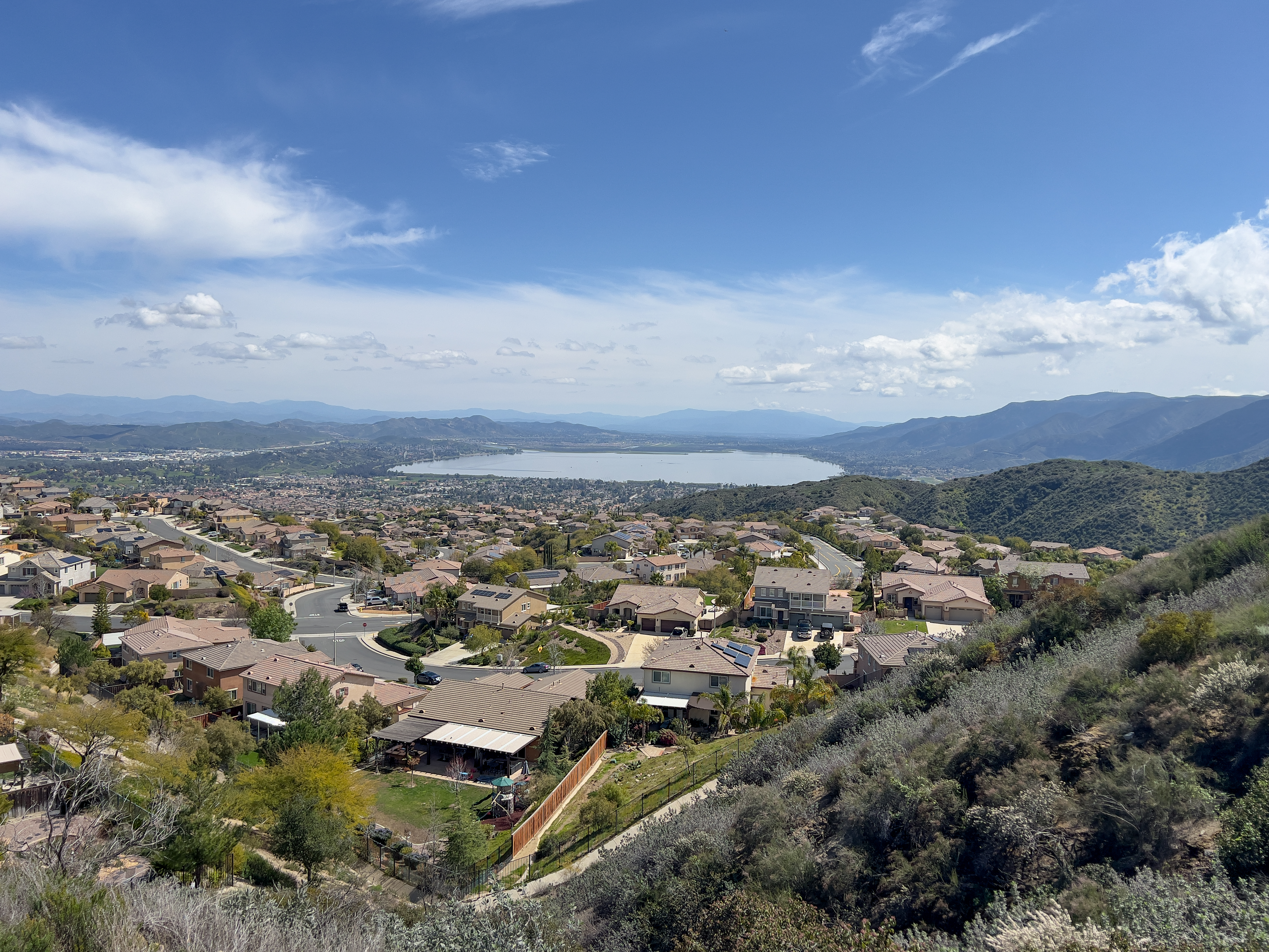
Part of the Elsinore Trough looking south from hills of North Elsinore

The Elsinore Trough is a graben rift valley in Riverside County, southern California. It is created by the Elsinore Fault Zone.

It is located between the Santa Ana Mountains to the west, and the Temescal Mountains of the Perris Block and the Temecula Basin to the east.

This graben valley is broken into a series of sections by transverse faults. These smaller graben valleys are the Temescal Valley, Elsinore Valley, Temecula Valley and Wolf Valley.

The cities of Corona, Lake Elsinore, Murrieta, Temecula, and Wildomar; the census-designated place of Temescal Valley; and the Reservation of the Pechanga Band of Luiseno Mission Indians are located in the Elsinore Trough.
