= Riverside County Library System =

Public library system in California, United States

Coordinates: 33.9825°N 117.3716°W

- Location: Library Management Offices; 5840 Mission Blvd. Riverside, California, 92509; 951-369-3003; Fax 951-369-6801; Hours: M–F 8–5
- Established: 1911
- Branches: 35, 2 museums and 2 resource vans

Collection
- Size: 1,550,173 books and periodicals 52,742 audio materials (CDs, audiobooks); 23,731 video items (DVDs and VHS tapes)

Access and use
- Circulation: 3,464,547 items 42% are children's materials 3,170,424 visits/year 127,717 program attendance/year
- Population served: 1,094,681

Other information
- Director: Barbara Howison (Director and County Librarian)
- Employees: 214 (FTEs); 31 ALA-accredited librarians
- Website: www.rivlib.net

The Riverside County Library System (RCLS), located in Riverside County, California, United States, is a public library system composed of 35 libraries, two museums and two mobile resource vans. The RCLS is a member of the Inland Library Network. It is the first library system in the nation that turned over its entire operation to a private company.

== Management ==
Prior to July 1997, the Riverside County public libraries were managed by the city of Riverside, California. When property tax money was diverted from libraries to schools in the early 1990s, the library system began to experience cut in hours, dwindling collections, and staff lay-offs. In July 1997, the County hired Library Systems and Services, Inc., located in Germantown, Maryland to operate its sprawling public library system. All library employees, except for the county librarian, janitorial service, and landscape maintenance, work for the private company. LS&S divided the library system into three districts, increased hours within each district and added staff. For its success, the RCLS Management Outsourcing Program became the 1998 National Council for Public-Private Partnerships Project Award Winner.

== Services ==
- RCLS operates several in-demand literacy services including Adult Literacy, English as a Second Language, and Digital Literacy.
- An extensive digital resources catalogue including career building tools, homework help and e-resources.
- All library locations offer printing services to community members
- All library locations offer free Wi-Fi and computer access. Wi-Fi hotspots and Chromebooks are also available for loan from all branches including the mobile resource vans.
- Project Connect Now supports social work programs for the at-risk and homeless population of Riverside, including the "Lawyers in the Library" program which brings free legal aid to those in need.
- Through grant funding from the California State Library and partnerships with local school districts, "Lunch at the Library" provides a free lunch for all those under 18 during the summer.
- With funding from the California State Library and California State Parks, library card holders can now check out a park pass to bring their family to any of the hundreds of state parks throughout California
- The Riverside County Library System is co-recipient of the Raul and Estella Mora Award for its annual promotion of Día de los Niños/Día de los Libros.
- The program earned the library a John Cotton Dana Award in 2005. for the outreach program Leer Es Triunfar (Reading Is Succeeding), an outreach program for the system's Spanish language readers.
- The Riverside County Library was chosen by the Association for Library Services to Children as the site of the 2010 Arbuthnot Lecture, featuring Kathleen T. Horning.

== Retrospective ==
In November 2007, RCLS sponsored a retrospective exhibit of photographs portraying 125 years of Riverside County library history, "The Libraries of Riverside County: A Millennium of Service" in the lobby of the UC Riverside Science Library as well as traveling over 250 miles throughout the county. The exhibit was viewed by over 275,000 people during its year long exhibition. It commemorated public, private, academic, medical and tribal libraries in Riverside County. In 2022, the System celebrates 25 years since the merger with LS&S.

== Members ==
=== Library Connect Mobile Resource Vans ===
- Desert Resource Van
- Western Resource Van

=== Libraries ===
- Anza Valley Community Library
- Cabazon Library
- Calimesa Library
- Canyon Lake Branch Library
- Cathedral City Branch Library
- Coachella Branch Library
- Desert Hot Springs Library
- Eastvale Library
- El Cerrito Library
- French Valley Library
- Glen Avon Branch Library
- Grace Mellman Community Library
- Highgrove Branch Library
- Home Gardens Library
- Idyllwild Branch Library
- Indio Library
- La Quinta Library
- Lake Elsinore Library
- Lake Tamarisk Library
- Lakeside Branch Library
- Louis Robidoux Branch Library
- Mead Valley Library
- Mecca Library
- Menifee Library
- Norco Branch Library
- Nuview Branch Library
- Perris Library
- San Jacinto Branch Library
- Sun City Branch Library
- Ronald H. Roberts Temecula Public Library
- Thousand Palms Library
- Valle Vista Library
- Wildomar Library
- Woodcrest Community Library

=== Museums ===
- Edward Dean Museum
- La Quinta Museum

== Former Members ==
- Palm Desert Public Library operated as part of the RCLS until July 1, 2024
