= List of schools in Reading, Berkshire =

This is a list of schools in Reading in the English county of Berkshire.

== State-funded schools ==
=== Primary schools ===
- Alfred Sutton Primary School
- All Saints CE Infant School
- All Saints Junior School
- Battle Primary Academy
- Caversham Park Primary School
- Caversham Primary School
- Christ the King RC Primary School
- Churchend Primary Academy
- Civitas Academy
- Coley Primary School
- EP Collier Primary School
- Emmer Green Primary School
- English Martyrs' RC Primary School
- Geoffrey Field Infant School
- Geoffrey Field Junior School
- Green Park Village Primary Academy
- The Heights Primary School
- The Hill Primary School
- Katesgrove Primary School
- Manor Primary School
- Meadow Park Academy
- Micklands Primary School
- Moorlands Primary School
- New Christ Church CE Primary School
- New Town Primary School
- Oxford Road Community School
- The Palmer Primary Academy
- Park Lane Primary School
- Ranikhet Academy
- Redlands Primary School
- The Ridgeway Primary School
- St Anne's RC Primary School
- St John's CE Primary School
- St Martin's RC Primary School
- St Mary and All Saints CE Primary School
- St Michael's Primary School
- Southcote Primary School
- Thameside Primary School
- Whitley Park Primary School
- Wilson Primary School

=== Non-selective secondary schools ===
- Blessed Hugh Faringdon Catholic School
- Hartland High School
- Highdown School
- King's Academy Prospect
- Little Heath School*
- Maiden Erlegh School in Reading
- Reading Girls' School
- River Academy
- UTC Reading
- The Wren School

*This school is located in West Berkshire but also admits pupils from Reading

=== Grammar schools ===
- Kendrick School
- Reading School

=== Special and alternative schools ===
- The Avenue Special School
- Cranbury College
- Hamilton School
- The Holy Brook School
- Thames Valley School

=== Further education ===
- Reading College

== Independent schools ==
=== Primary and preparatory schools ===
- Caversham Preparatory School
- Hemdean House School
- St Edward's Prep
- Trinity Christian School

=== Senior and all-through schools ===
- The Abbey School
- The Deenway Montessori School
- Leighton Park School
- OneSchool Global UK
- Queen Anne's School
- St Joseph's College
- Reading Blue Coat School
- Crosfields School

=== Special and alternative schools ===
- The Red Balloon Learner Centre
