= Oak Mountain (Riverside County) =

Mountain in the American state of California

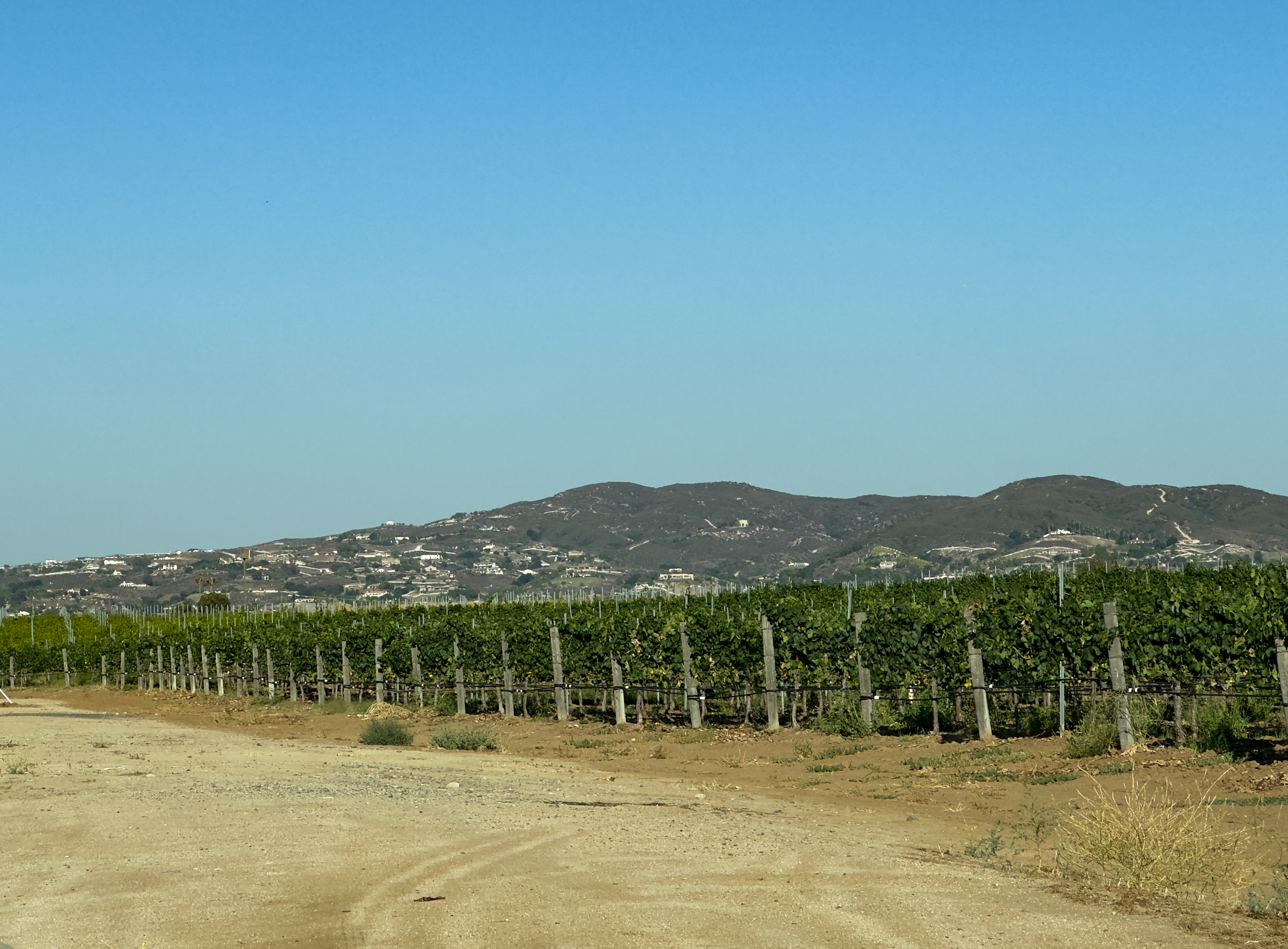
- A view of Oak Mountain from Temecula Vineyards

Highest point
- Elevation: 2,710 ft (830 m)
- Prominence: 206 ft (63 m)
- Coordinates: 33°30′56.65″N 116°58′38.51″W

Geography
- Location within California Location within the United States
- Location: Riverside County, California, United States
- Parent range: San Jacinto Mountains
- Topo map: USGS Sage

Oak Mountain is a mountain in the northern Peninsular Ranges System, in Riverside County, in southern California.

Oak Mountain consists of a mountain with two peaks, the northern at 2,706 feet (825 m), taller than the southern at 2,126 feet (648 m), which is located east of the city of Temecula, dividing Pauba Valley from Butterfield Valley. The two peaks of the mountain are divided by the gorge of Temecula Creek Canyon which has Vail Lake Dam at its head. The Vail Lake reservoir is to the east of its southern peak and southeast of its northern peak and at the base of the mountain. The Black Hills lie to the north of the mountain and Agua Tibia Mountain lies to its south.

The northern peak is located at 33°30′57″N 116°58′38″W. The southern peak is located at 33°29′11″N 117°00′40″W.
