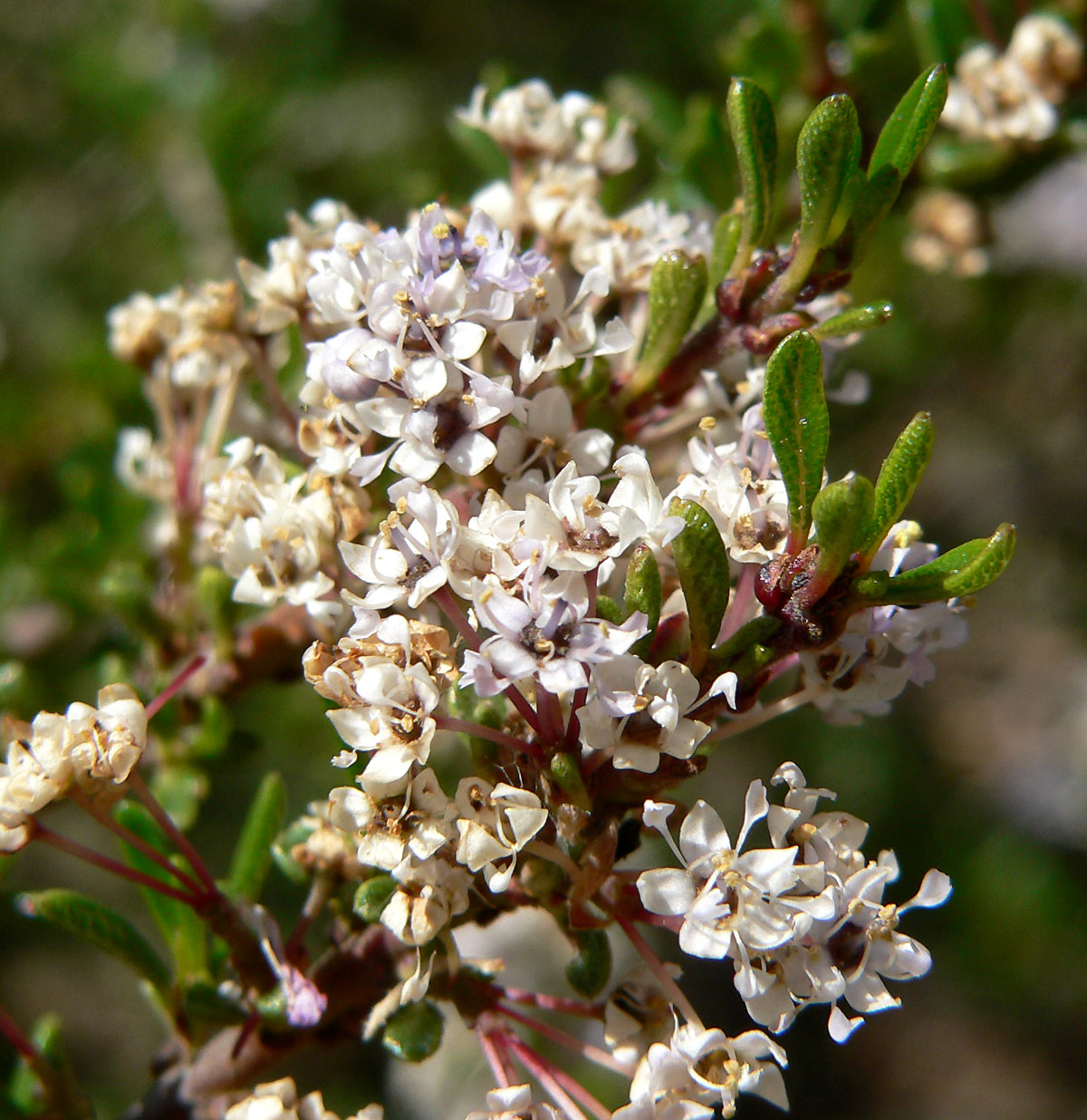

Conservation status
- Threatened (ESA)

Scientific classification
- Kingdom: Plantae
- Clade: Tracheophytes
- Clade: Angiosperms
- Clade: Eudicots
- Clade: Rosids
- Order: Rosales
- Family: Rhamnaceae
- Genus: Ceanothus
- Subgenus: C. subg. Cerastes
- Species: C. ophiochilus

Binomial name
- Ceanothus ophiochilus Boyd, Ross & Arnseth

= Ceanothus ophiochilus =

Species of flowering plant

Ceanothus ophiochilus is a rare species of flowering shrub known by the common name Vail Lake ceanothus, native to Southern California. It was not described until 1991.

== Description ==
Ceanothus ophiochilus is an erect shrub reaching a maximum of 2 metres (6.6 ft) but generally shorter. The young twigs are reddish and grow gray with age. The tiny evergreen leaves grow opposite on the branches and sometimes grow in clusters, and rarely reach a centimeter in length. They are thick, firm, and shiny.

The shrub flowers in short inflorescences of pale blue to white to pale pink flowers during February and March.

=== Fire ecology ===
This species grows only from seed, unlike other Ceanothus, which via an evolved fire ecology usually crown sprout from the lignotuber root crown after being reduced aboveground, such as by natural wildfires.

== Distribution ==
The Ceanothus ophiochilus plant is endemic to California. It is only known from a few sites in the vicinity of Vail Lake and the Black Hills, east of Temecula and west of the Santa Rosa Mountains in southwestern Riverside County.

Ceanothus ophiochilus is a plant of the chaparral plant community, and in its small native range which currently is only a few acres, it grows in pyroxenite soil atop an ancient volcano. Its elevation range is 580–1,065 metres (1,903–3,494 ft).

One of the three remaining populations of this plant is on private property that may face development in the future. It was listed as a threatened species on the federal level in 1998, and an endangered species by the state of California in 1994. There are up to 9000 individuals remaining, but some of these are hybrids with Ceanothus crassifolius.

== Cultivation ==
Ceanothus ophiochilus is cultivated by California native plant botanic gardens and plant nurseries, and available as an ornamental plant for: drought tolerant and native plant gardens, and natural landscape habitat gardens and larger landscape projects.
