= Vail Lake =

Man-made reservoir in California, United States

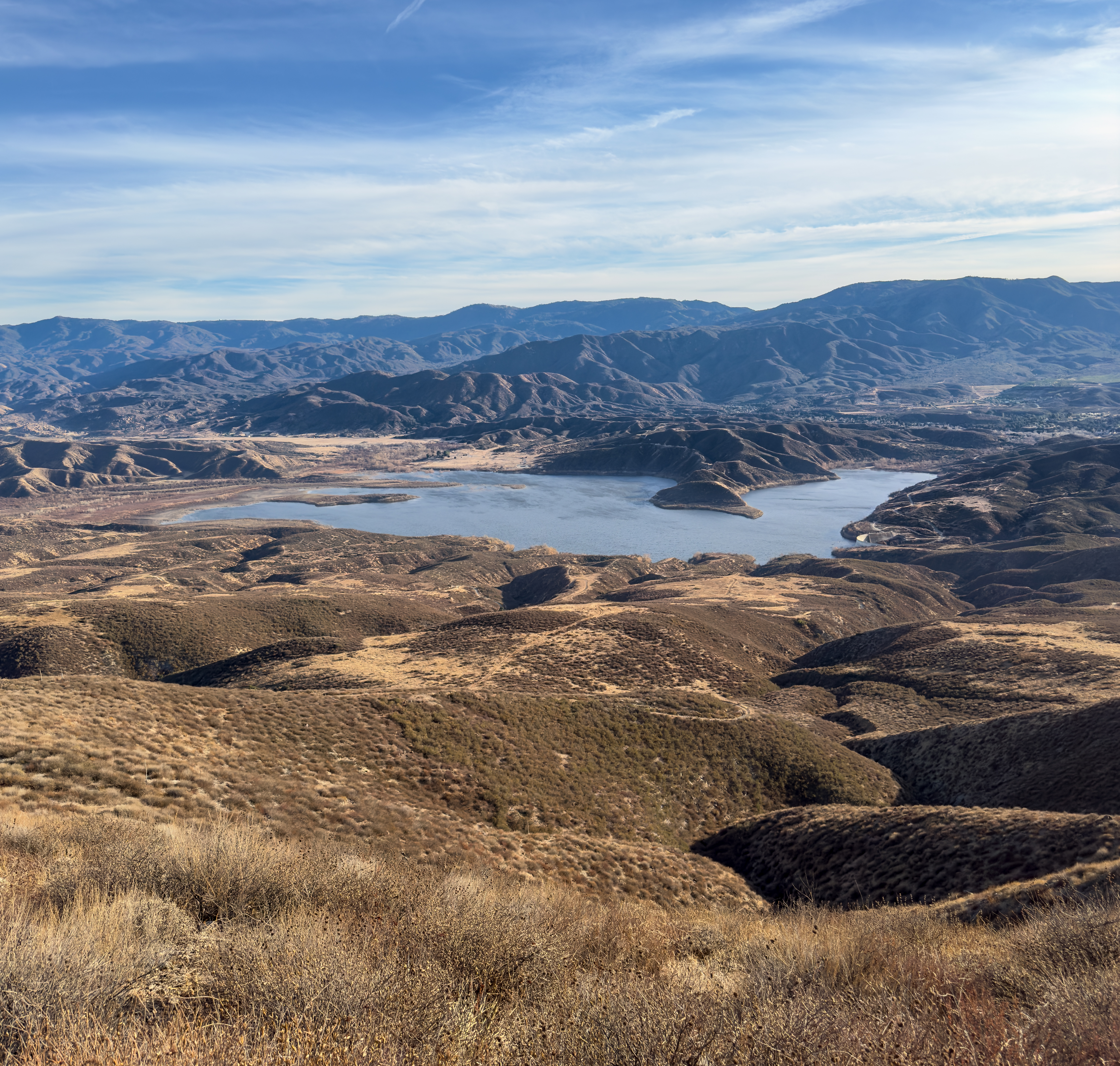
- A view of Vail Lake and Palomar Mountain from Oak Mountain

- Location within California Location within the United States
- Location: Riverside County, California
- Coordinates: 33°29′28″N 116°58′17″W
- Type: reservoir
- Primary inflows: Temecula Creek, Kolb Creek, Wilson Creek
- Primary outflows: Temecula Creek
- Basin countries: United States
- Managing agency: Rancho California Water District
- Water volume: 61.5×10^{6} m^{3} (49,900 acre⋅ft)
- Surface elevation: 1,460 ft (450 m)
- Website: www.ranchowater.com/265/Vail-Lake

Vail Lake is a large reservoir in western Riverside County, California.

== Geography ==
It is located on Temecula Creek, in the Butterfield Valley, south of Oak Mountain, of the Black Hills, in the Santa Margarita River watershed. It is approximately 15 miles (24 km) east of Temecula.

Vail Lake covers approximately 1,100 acres (4.5 km^{2}) and has a storage capacity of 51,000 acre-feet (63,000,000 m^{3}), although it currently contains about 34,000 acre-feet (42,000,000 m^{3}) of water.

Vail Lake is supplied by stormwater runoff from Kolb, Temecula, and Wilson Creeks. Surface water stored in the lake is used to help replenish local groundwater supplies through recharge operations.

Flora

Land near Vail Lake is the only known native habitat of the endemic and endangered flowering shrub Ceanothus ophiochilus, which was named the Vail Lake ceanothus when it was discovered in 1989.

== History ==
It was created in 1948 when the owners of the Vail Ranch, the successor to Rancho Pauba, constructed the 132-foot (40 m) high Vail Lake Dam. In 1964, the Vail Ranch was sold to the Kaiser—Aetna partnership. A later purchase by the group brought the total area to 97,500 acres (395 km2), and the area became known as Rancho California.

In 1977, the present-day Rancho California Water District was formed. Vail Lake has been owned and operated by the Rancho California Water District since 1978.

The property surrounding Vail Lake is privately owned, and recreational access to the lake is privately controlled. The Butterfield Country Recreation Park was established in 1968 to provide public access to the lake and its marina, but the park was closed by its owners in 1989. In 1995, a members-only resort facility was opened at the location of the former park, and in 2000, the area was re-opened to the public on an annual-fee basis. Recreational activities at Vail Lake include fishing, boating, RV camping, mountain biking, miniature golf, and swimming.

It is the flooded site of the Temecula Massacre, which claimed 33 to over 100 lives among Luiseño Natives.

== See also ==
- List of dams and reservoirs in California
- List of lakes in California
