= Temecula Valley =

Valley in Riverside County, California, United States

- Valle de Temecula (Spanish)
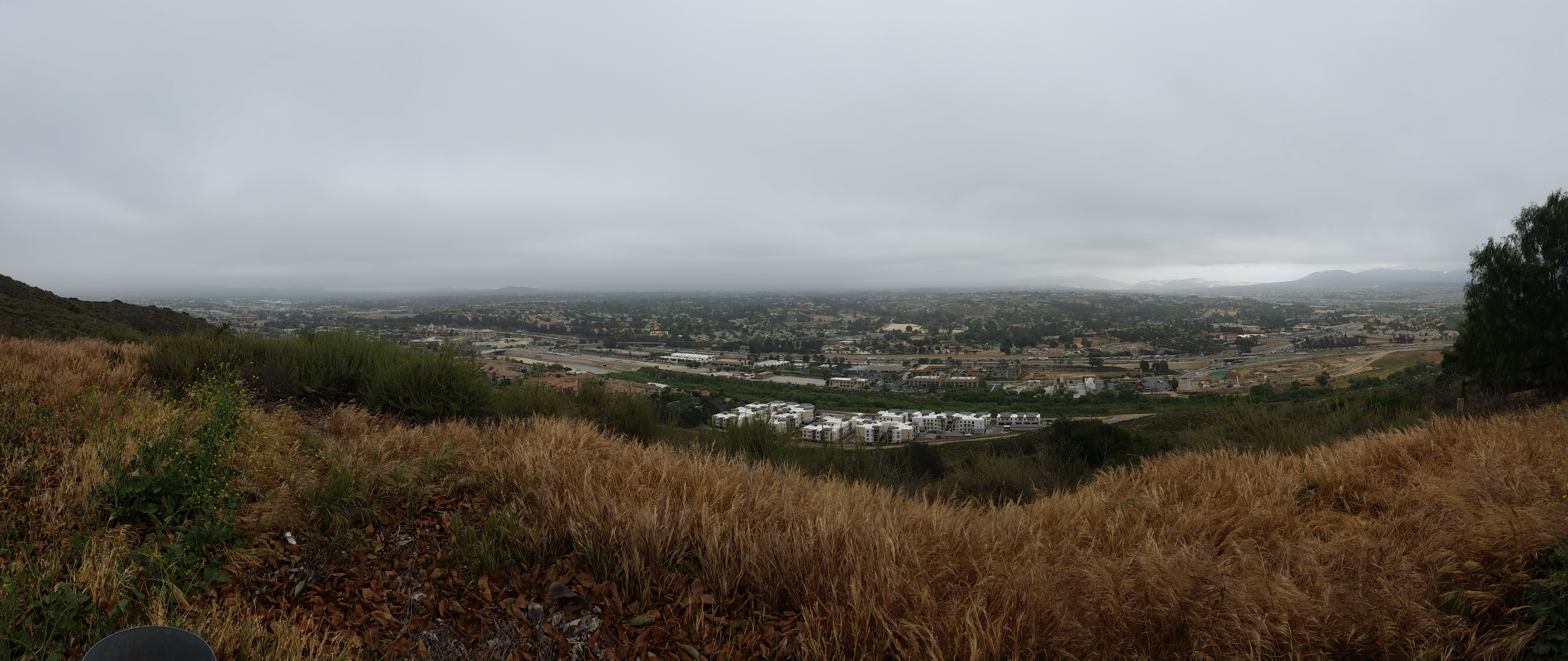
- Panoramic overlooking the Temecula Valley

- Location within southern California

Geography
- Location: Riverside County, California
- Coordinates: 33°33′20″N 117°12′40″W
- Interactive map of Temecula Valley

The Temecula Valley (Spanish: Valle de Temecula) is a graben rift valley in western Riverside County, California.

The Temecula Valley is one of the graben valleys making up the Elsinore Trough, created by the Elsinore Fault Zone. It lies between the Wildomar Fault on the east, at the foot of the Temescal Mountains and of the Temecula Basin and the Willard Fault on the west, at the foot of the Santa Ana Mountains. The Temecula Valley lies northwest of Temecula Creek, and its head (33°36′46″N 117°17′33″W) is south of the Elsinore Valley, from which it is divided by a low rise between the Temescal and Santa Ana Mountains.

The valley is drained by Murrieta Creek, Temecula Creek, and their tributaries. Their confluence forms the Santa Margarita River.

The original centers of the cities of Murrieta, Temecula and Wildomar are located in the Temecula Valley.
