= Black Hills (Riverside County) =

Small and low mountain range in Riverside County, California, United States

- Location within California Location within the United States

Highest point
- Elevation: 2,739 ft (835 m)

Geography
- Country: United States
- State: California
- Region: Peninsular Ranges
- District: Riverside County
- Range coordinates: 33°31′38.103″N 116°58′22.090″W
- Topo map: USGS Sage

The Black Hills are a small and low mountain range in the northern Peninsular Ranges System, in Riverside County, California, United States. Its summit is 2,739 feet (835 m).

They are located east of the city of Temecula. Oak Mountain is to the south of the hills.

== See also ==
- Ceanothus ophiochilus (Vail Lake ceanothus) — endemic to the hills area.
