= Grace Mellman Community Library =

Public library in Temecula, California, US

Coordinates: 33°31′36″N 117°09′38″W

Grace Mellman Community Library (Temecula County Center Library)
- Location: 41000 County Center Drive; Temecula, California, 92591
- Established: 1992

Collection
- Size: 80,000

Other information

The Grace Mellman Community Library (Temecula County Center Library), located in Temecula, California, is a member of the Riverside County Library System. As a full-service library, it has over 80,000 items, and offers materials, programs, and services for all ages which include guest speakers, free movie nights and a monthly book club.

To reach the children's room, students pass through a "magic tunnel", an experience shared by many first-grade students in the city.

Originally known as the Temecula Branch of the Riverside County Free Library, it experienced rapid growth in its $3-million facility that was partially funded by the fund raising efforts of local citizens. In 2006, the City of Temecula opened the Temecula Public Library on Pauba Road, and with the opening of the new structure, the existing library’s name was changed to the Grace Mellman Community Library, named after Grace Mellman—the woman behind the original fund-raising effort and former president of the Friends of the Temecula Libraries.
