= Terwilliger Valley =

Valley in Riverside County, California

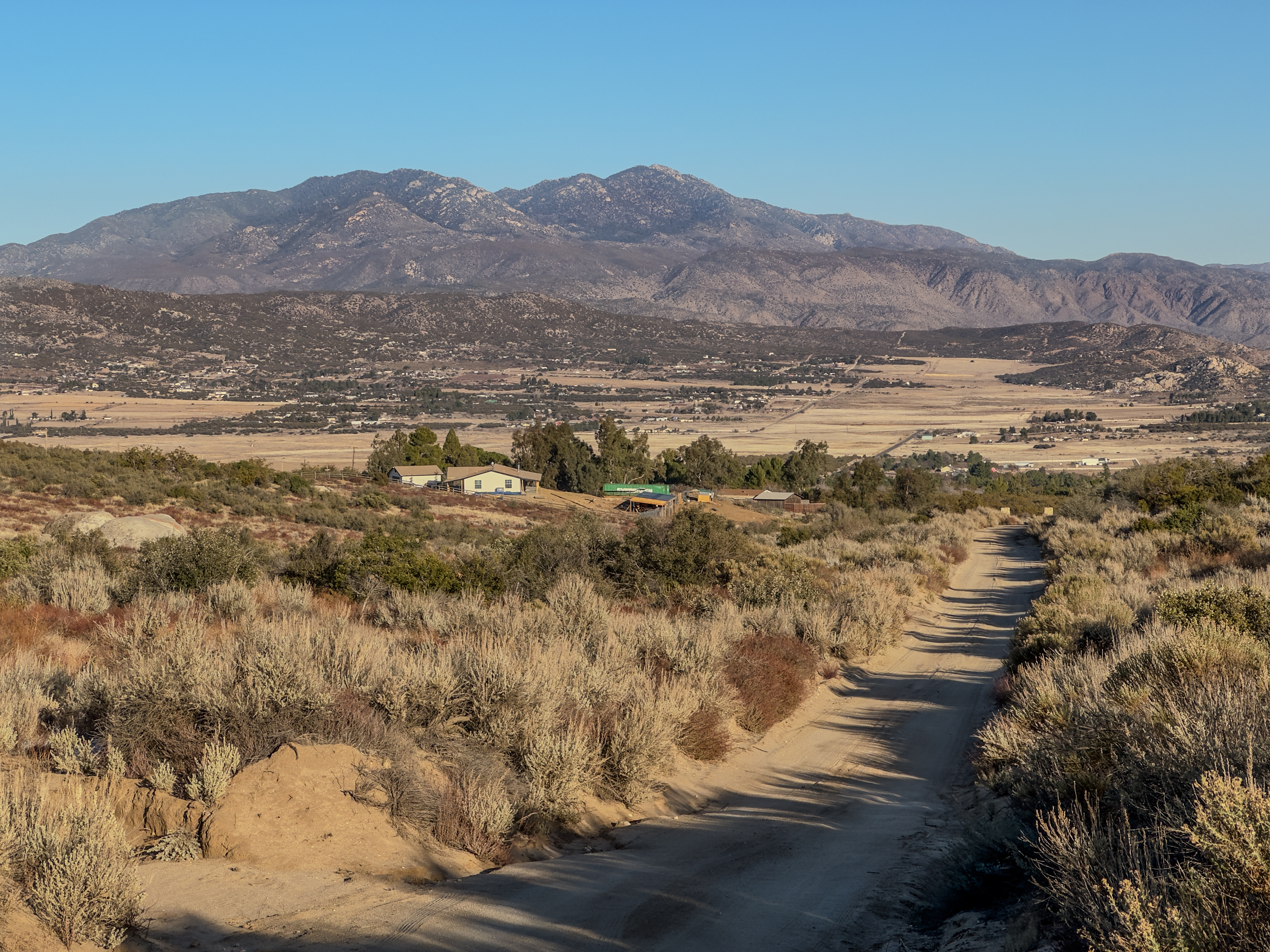
- Facing east, a view of Terwilliger Valley with Toro Peak in the back
- Area: 12.5 square miles (32 km^{2})

Geography
- Location: California
- Coordinates: 33.5000301°N 116.6383518°W
- Interactive map of Terwilliger Valley

Terwilliger Valley is a basin in Riverside County, California. The valley lies at an elevation of 3,885 feet (1,184 m).

== Geography ==
It is 2 miles southeast of Anza Valley, however unlike Terwilliger Valley, water from the Anza Valley eventually drains into the Pacific Ocean. Terwilliger Valley is drained by Coyote Creek, which leads to Coyote Canyon in Anza-Borrego Desert State Park, a popular destination for desert wildflower viewing.

The basin is immediately west of the San Jacinto Fault. It was the site of a 6.0 earthquake in 1937.
