= Cahuilla Creek =

Stream in the American state of California

Location
- Country: United States
- State: California

Cahuilla Creek is a tributary stream of Wilson Creek which is in turn a tributary of Temecula Creek, and the Santa Margarita River in Riverside County, California. Its mouth is at its confluence with Wilson Creek at an elevation of 2,106 feet (642 m). Its source is at 33°36′40″N 116°40′10″W, at an elevation of 5,800 feet, on the west slope of Thomas Mountain 0.6 miles west-southwest of Tool Box Spring. It flows southwest through the Anza Valley and Cahuilla Valley in the Cahuilla Indian Reservation to Wilson Creek, 7 miles south-southwest of Cahuilla Mountain and 20 miles south-southeast of San Jacinto.
