= Library Systems & Services =

For-profit company that manages municipal libraries on an outsourced basis

Library Systems & Services is a private for-profit company that manages municipal libraries on an outsourced basis. It is the largest library outsourcing company in the United States. It runs 20 library systems in 80 locations. Its headquarters are in Rockville, Maryland and it also operates in the UK.

The company started in 1982 with the MINI MARC cataloging system and custom software for libraries. It expanded into managing libraries at housed within federal agencies, an opportunity created by Reagan-era privatization policies. In 1997 it began operating public library systems after signing a contract with the Riverside County Library System in California. The privatization of public library services was controversial, especially with employees of the libraries, and involved replacing unionized employees with non-union employees. One of the ways that the company was able to save money for local governments was by offering remote reference librarian services to all its customers, starting in 2000.

In 2017, Escondido, CA residents sued the city of Escondido for their decision to privatize the Escondido Public Library (EPL).
