= Thomas Mountain (Riverside County) =

Mountain summit in Riverside County, California

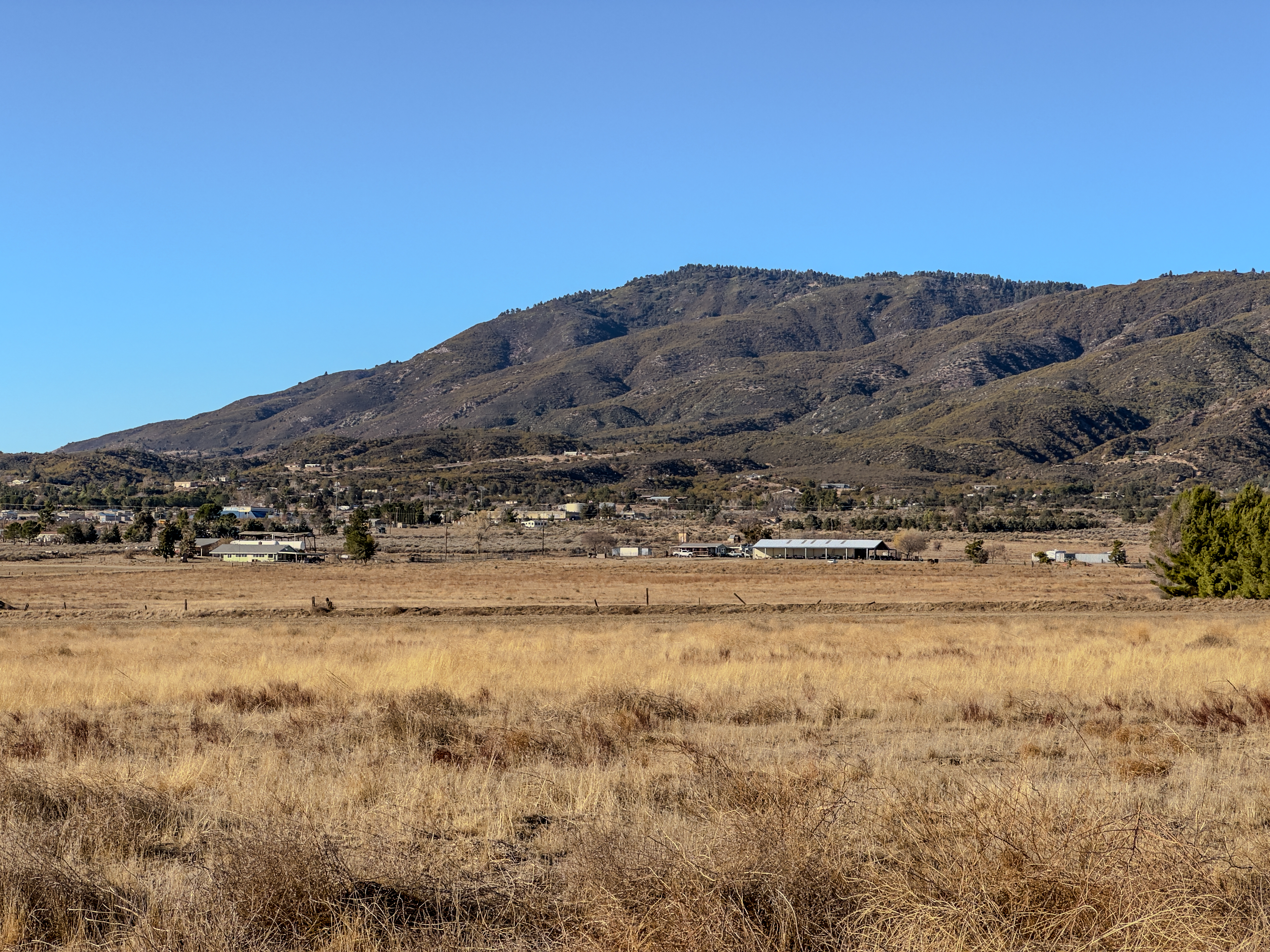
- A view of Thomas Mountain from the Anza Valley

Highest point
- Elevation: 6,815 ft (2,077 m)

Geography
- Location within California Location within the United States
- Country: United States
- State: California
- County: Riverside County
- Range coordinates: 33°37′16.93″N 116°40′57.37″W
- Parent range: Peninsular Ranges

Thomas Mountain is a mountain summit of the Peninsular Ranges System, in Riverside County, California.

== Geography ==
Thomas Mountain forms the north boundary of the Anza Valley. The community of Thomas Mountain, California, named after the summit, is located on the east side of the mountain. Bautista Canyon lies between Thomas Mountain and Cahuilla Mountain.

== History ==
Thomas Mountain was the site of Thomas Mountain Lookout, a fire tower and residence. It was built in 1935, and used during World War II as a plane spotting post. After suffering damage from fire and also vandalism, it was demolished and scrapped in 1973.

== See also ==
- Mountains of Riverside County, California
