= Temecula's Chapel of Memories =

Historic building in Temecula, California

Coordinates: 33°29′49″N 117°09′05″W

The Chapel of Memories, formerly St. Catherine's of Alexandria Church, is an historic building in Temecula, California. Built in 1917, the building is now located in Sam Hicks Monument Park on the north side of Old Town Temecula.

Chapel of Memories is owned by the Old Town Temecula Museum Society.

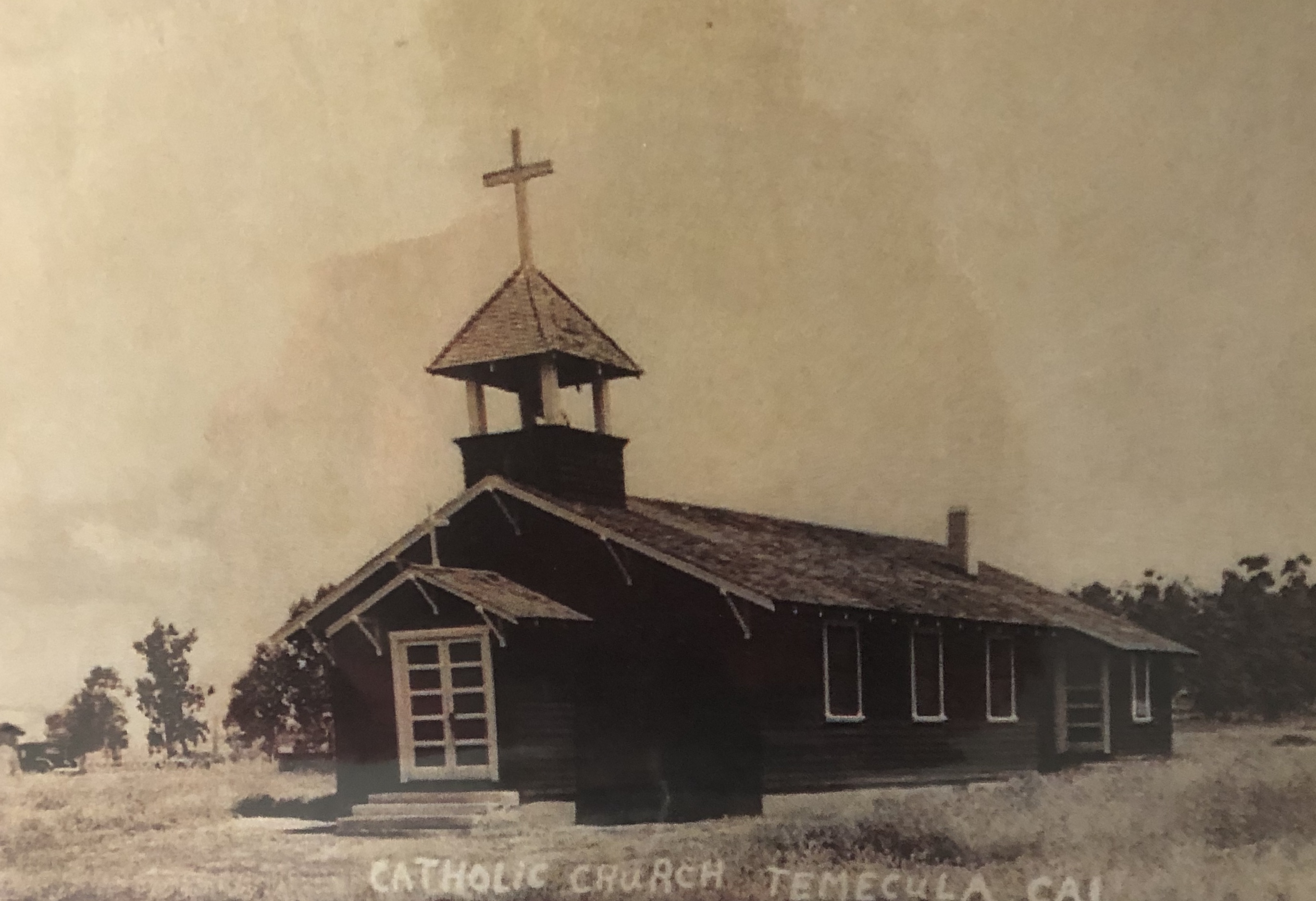
Newly Built St. Katherine's, Temecula, CA (1917)

== History ==
In 1910, Father John J. Burri was assigned to Temecula in 1910 to serve the area as an extension of San Luis Rey Mission. Burri decided that the town needed a new church to accommodate the growing local Catholic congregation that typically met in school buildings.

Local Residents and the Roman Catholic Diocese of San Bernardino embraced the project. Local resident Macedonia Machado and the Santa Fe Railroad donated $1500 to purchase six lots at the corner of 6th and Front Streets for the building.

On December 4, 1916, Del Clark and R.J. Smith of Elsinore were told to begin chapel construction on February 9, 1917. The 1st National Bank of Temecula granted a loan of $1,200 to purchase building materials.

It was estimated that a stone chapel would cost $3,000-$4,000 and a wooden one $1,500. It was decided to build a wooden structure. The chapel measured 26 ft × 36 ft (7.9 m × 11.0 m) with dark brown stained clapboard siding. It had granite block front steps and a 7 ft (2.1 m) wide granite altar, all quarried locally and donated by the Church and Jean Laborde.

There still remained a $300 bank loan to pay. A barbecue fundraiser was held on April 15, 1917 at the Vail Ranch. Food, entertainment, the space, and lumber to build a large dance floor, tables and benches, were all donated.

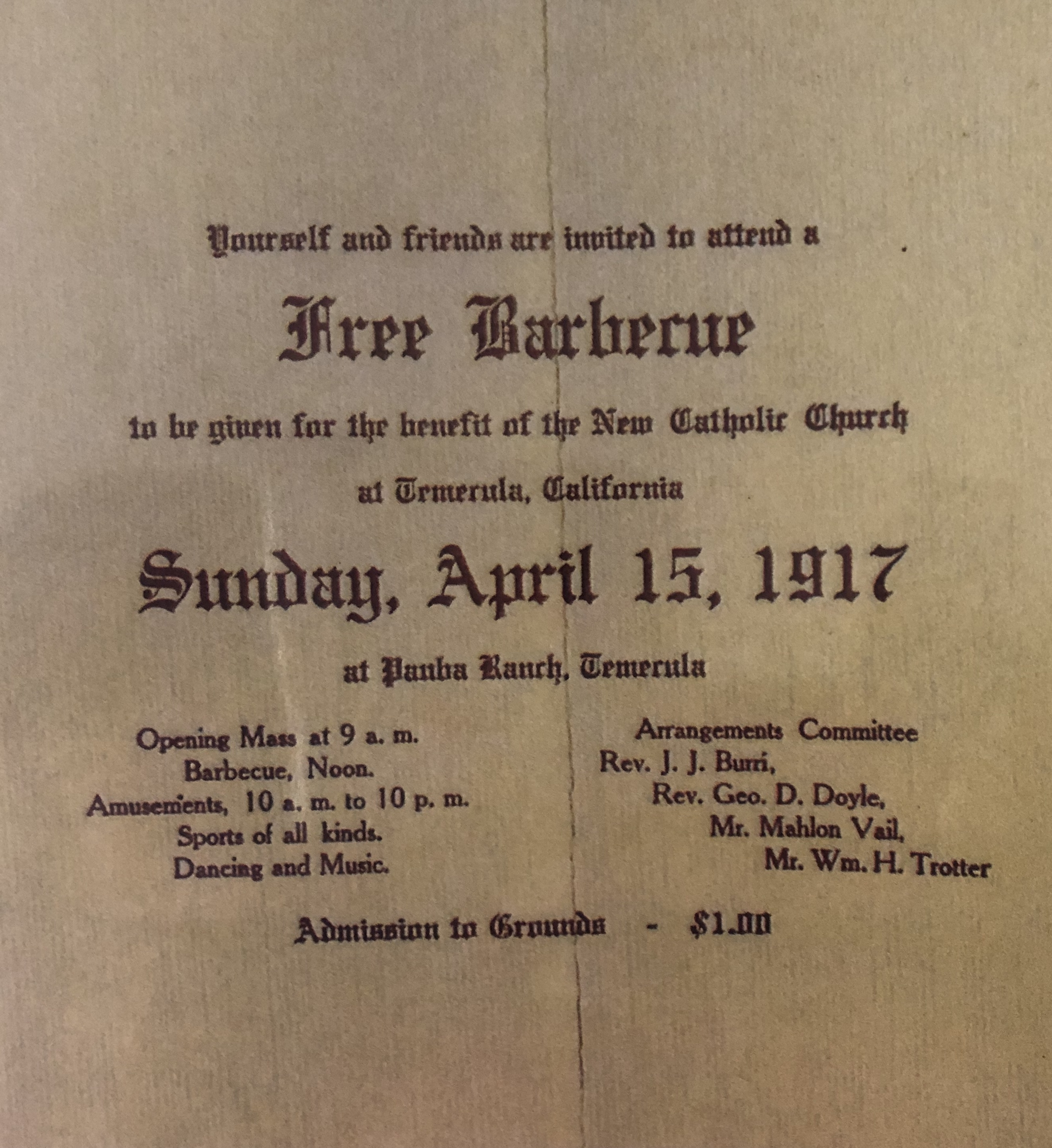
Day-long Benefit BBQ Invitation

At a cost of $1 per person for admission, the subsequent free barbeque fundraiser attracted more than 800 people, many traveling from Los Angeles and San Diego. Entertainment consisted of a 45-minute wrestling exhibition, boxers, and high school athletes competed in various sporting games. The celebrations also included dance featuring indigenous groups and others. The bank loan was paid, and there was money left over to purchase a new car for Burri.

With the chapel completed to include a steeple, RJ Smith donated a 200-year-old bell in December 1917. The bell, however, was stolen in 1930. In 1969, when the US Navy decommissioned the USS Georgetown, it loaned the church and a 650-pound brass ship bell.

Today's chapel bell sounds are computer generated.

=== Fate of the Church ===
In 1988, the Roman Catholic Diocese of San Bernardino sold the valuable chapel land to pay for the construction of a new, larger Church. Tony and Mildred Tobin purchased the chapel building from the church for $1. The Tobins donated the building to the Old Town Temecula Museum Society, to be moved to a new museum complex in Sam Hicks Monument Park.

On May 5, 1989, contractors moved the Chapel to its new location. In November 1989, the society removed some old walls and rewired the building. Refurbishing the interior and meeting building codes was estimated to cost $50,000. To help offset costs, the Banning Rehabilitation & Counseling Center sent a 7-woman inmate work crew to paint the outside of the church.

Local businessman, Stan Hansen fabricated the stained glass windows using glass from a 100-year-old St. Joseph, Missouri church building.

==== Building dimensions ====
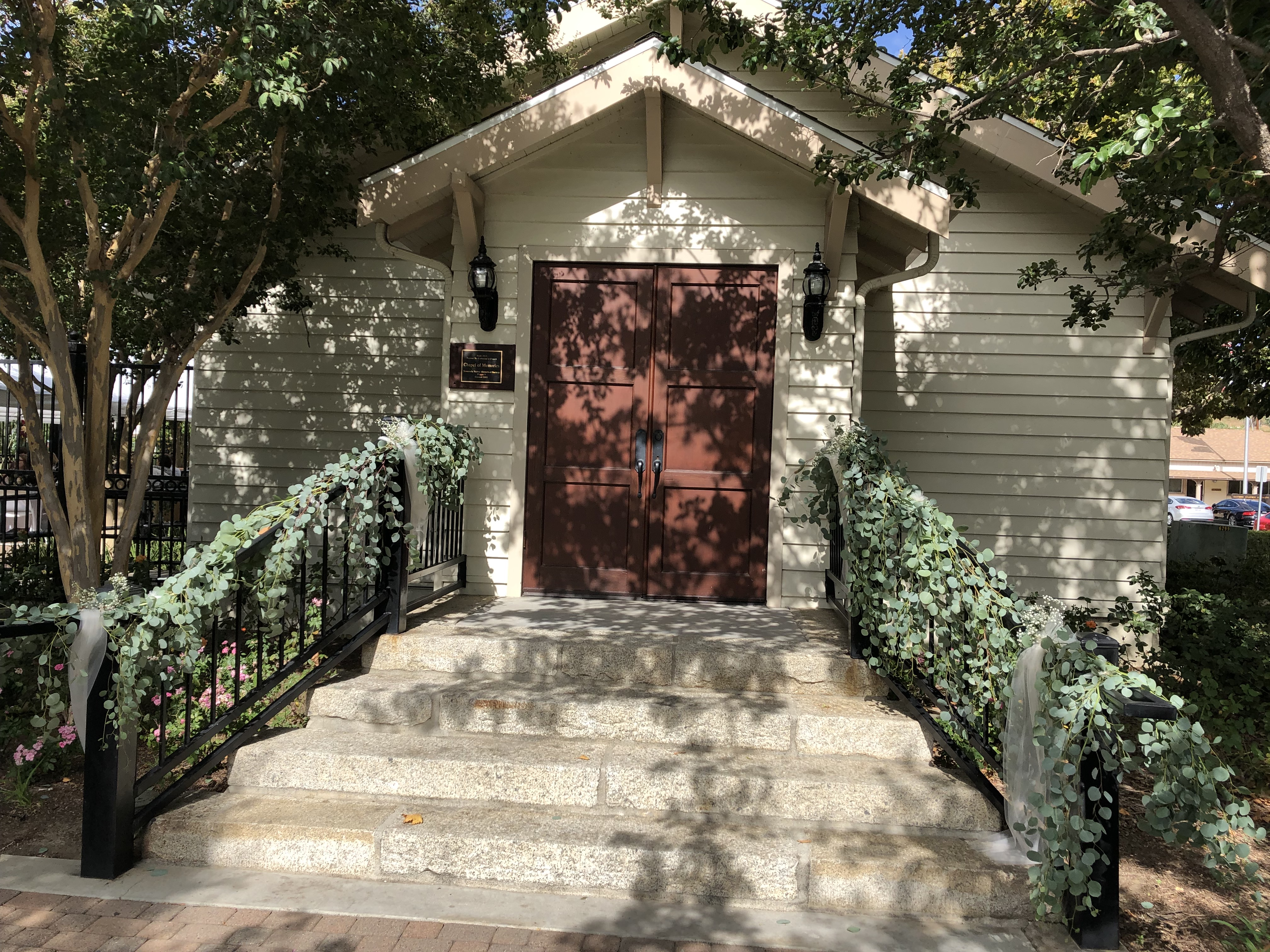
Present-day Chapel of Memories

The original building measured 26 ft × 36 ft (7.9 m × 11.0 m)

- Tabernacle: 7 ft × 3 1/2 ft × 8 ft (2.1 m × 1.1 m × 2.4 m) high
- Sanctuary: 12 ft × 12 ft (3.7 m × 3.7 m)
- Vestry: 10 ft × 12 ft (3.0 m × 3.7 m)

== Modern history ==
The Temecula Museum Board of Directors decided in 1994 that the newly renovated chapel should be made available for weddings. A local contest was held to determine a name for the non-denominational chapel. Bryna Bunderson, a 16-year-old resident, won the contest with her entry, "Chapel of Memories".

A community BBQ and birthday cake tasting celebrating the Chapel of Memories' Centennial took place on April 15, 2017. hosted by the City of Temecula and the Temecula Valley Museum, Inc. In keeping with tradition, the cost was $1.
