= Palm Desert Public Library =

City library in Riverside County, California

Coordinates: 33°43′05″N 116°22′24″W

The Palm Desert Library is located in the south end of the Multi-Agency Library building on the College of the Desert campus in Palm Desert, California, United States. Originally one of 35 libraries in the Riverside County Library System (RCLS), it transitioned to a city-operated library on July 1, 2024, after the Palm Desert City Council made the decision in 2023 to take over library operations.

The original Palm Desert Library opened in 1962 on Portola Avenue, where it remained for 33 years. In 1995, a new building was planned, financed, and constructed by a partnership between the City of Palm Desert, the County of Riverside, and the College of the Desert. A year later, on April 19, 1996, the newly-built 43,000-square foot, state-of-the-art, multi-agency facility on the College of the Desert campus opened at 73300 Fred Waring Drive.

While Palm Desert Library currently occupies the southern half of the building and the lobby, the College of the Desert Library occupied the northern half until January 2020.
