= Anza Valley =

Valley in Riverside County, California

- A north facing view of Cahuilla Mountain from the Anza Valley

Geography
- Location: California
- Coordinates: 33°34′30″N 116°42′03″W
- Interactive map of Anza Valley

Anza Valley, formerly known as the Hamilton Plains, is a basin in Riverside County, California. It lies at an elevation of 4,157 feet (1,267 m), west of the San Jacinto and Santa Rosa Mountains. Anza Valley trends southwest from Bautista Canyon, west of Thomas Mountain to Terwilliger Valley, 2.8 miles west-southwest of Table Mountain and 12 miles south of Idyllwild. It is drained by Cahuilla Creek, a tributary of the Santa Margarita River.

== History ==
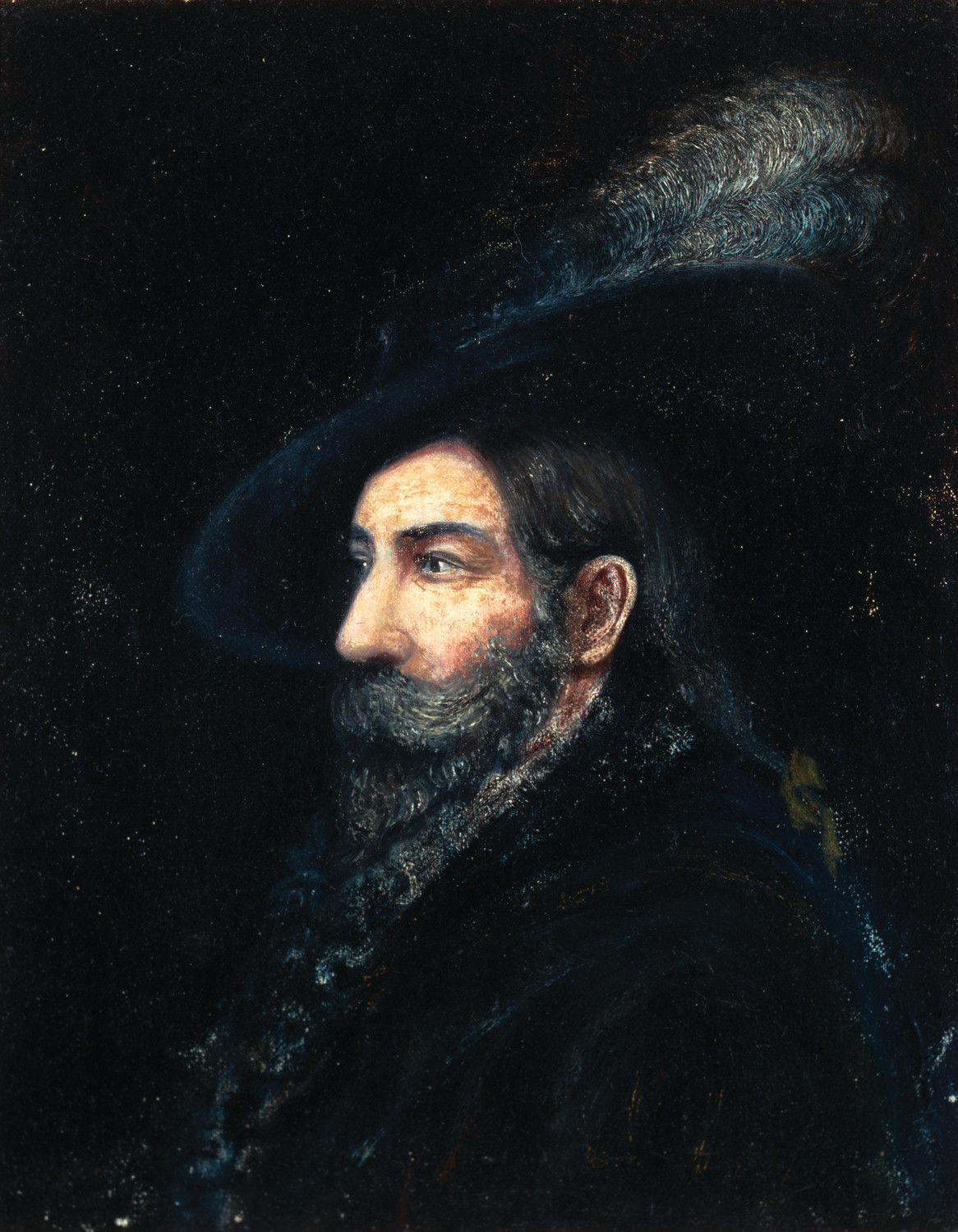
Anza Valley is named after Juan Bautista de Anza, a Spanish explorer who led the Anza expeditions into California.

Anza Valley is named after the Spanish soldier explorer Juan Bautista de Anza who first passed through the valley on March 16, 1774, and again on December 27, 1775. De Anza originally named the valley "San Carlos"; it was renamed in his honor from Cahuilla Valley to Anza Valley on September 16, 1926.

In the later 19th century, Anza Valley was named after its early pioneer settler, Jim Hamilton, an African American man who settled there after he lost his land in Butterfield Valley in a lawsuit over ownership of the Rancho Pauba in the early 1880s. Hamilton moved out to the lands of the Cahuilla, where he and two of his sons continued to raise cattle at their ranch in what is now the Anza Valley, which was first known as the Hamilton Plain. Hamilton Creek, originating east of Anza still bears his name. Hamilton School in Anza was also named after him. The school has been divided into a K–8 school and Hamilton High School since 2006–2007.

Hamilton was married to a Native American woman and had three sons. Two became U. S. Marshals, and one was killed in the line of duty at San Jacinto, California. The two surviving sons also married native women.
