= Wilson Creek (Temecula Creek tributary) =

Tributary stream in the American state of California

Wilson Creek is a tributary stream of Temecula Creek, itself a tributary of the Santa Margarita River, in Riverside County, California. Its mouth is at its confluence with the reservoir of Vail Lake on Temecula Creek at an elevation of 1,460 feet (450 m). Its source is located on the south slope of Little Cahuilla Mountain at 33°36′21″N 116°48′44″W, at an elevation of 4,880 feet (1,490 m). It descends south and southwest into Reed Valley, then to its confluence with Cahuilla Creek at the head of Wilson Valley. There it turns to flow westward through Wilson Valley and Lancaster Valley to its confluence with Vail Lake.
