= Rome Hill =

Hill near Lake Elsinore

Coordinates: 33°37′53″N 117°19′19″W

- St. Davids Hill
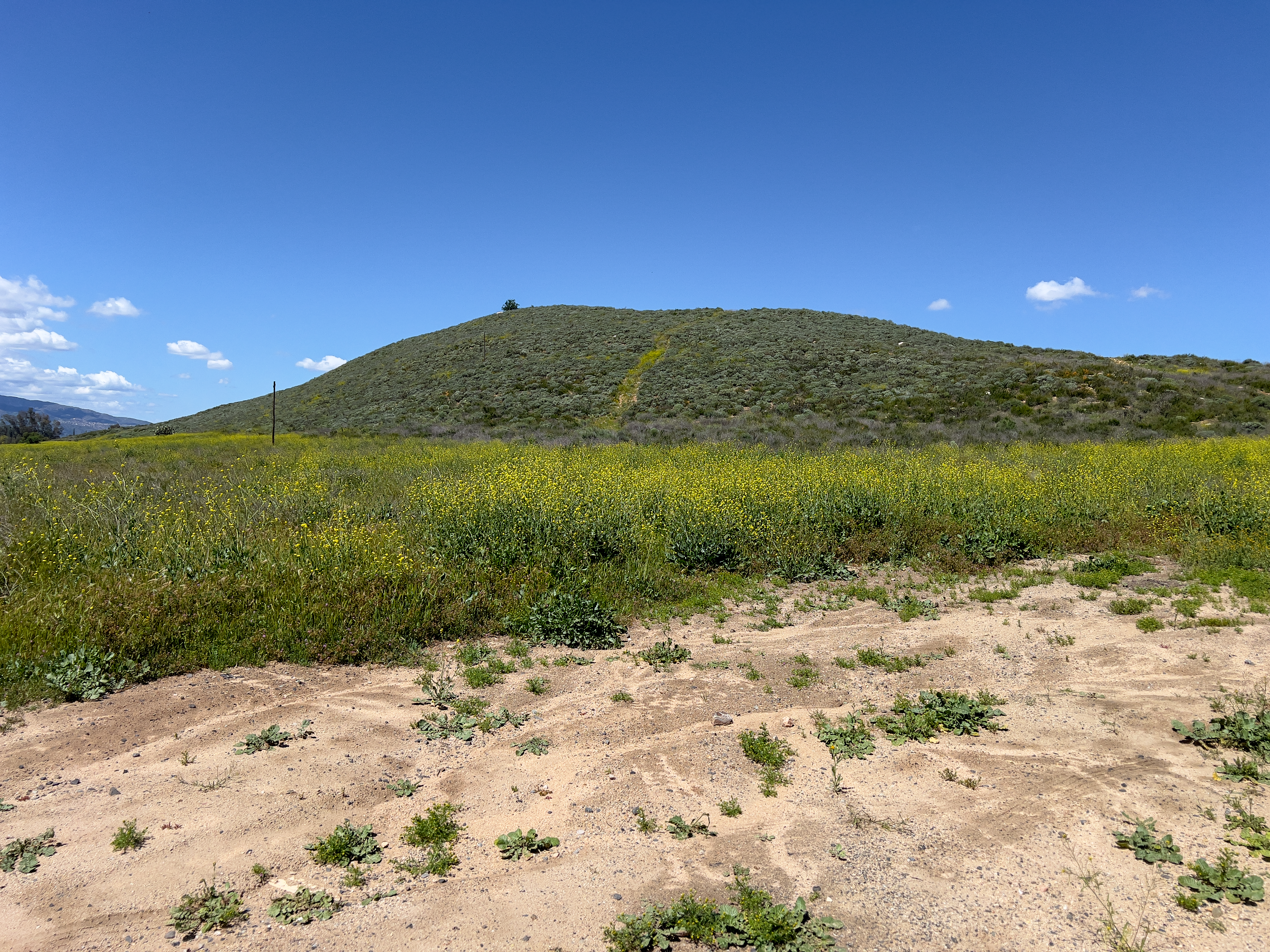
- Rome Hill viewed from the south

Highest point
- Elevation: 1,444 ft (440 m)

Geography
- Location within California
- Location: Riverside County, California, U.S.
- Topo map: USGS

Rome Hill, also called St. Davids Hill, is a small summit at the southwest corner of Lake Elsinore. It lies at an elevation of 1,444 feet/440 meters.
