= Bautista Canyon (Riverside County) =

Canyon in Riverside County, California, United States

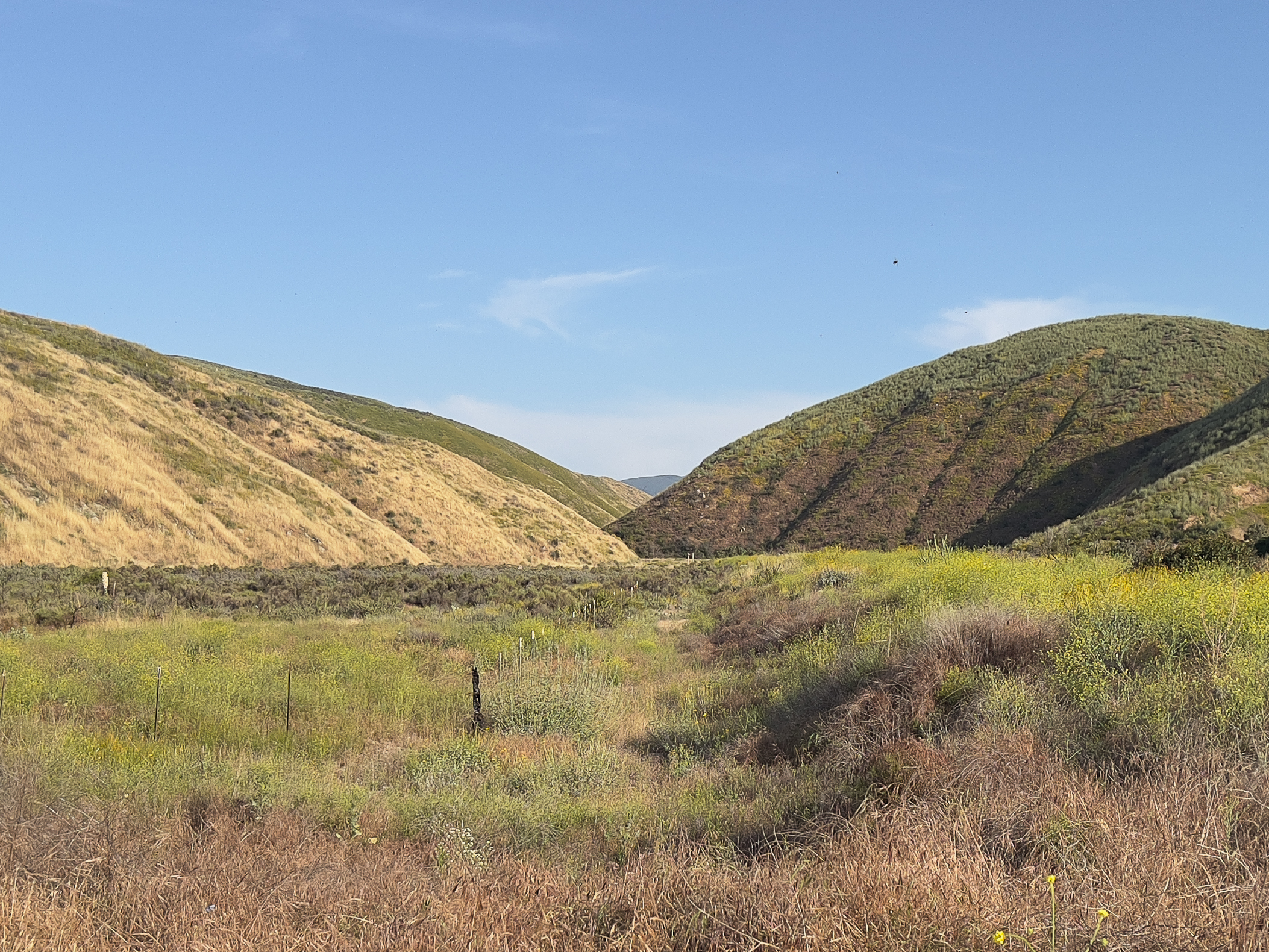
A view of Bautista Canyon facing upriver

Bautista Canyon is a valley in Riverside County, California. It lies between the Anza Valley and the San Jacinto Valley. It is named after Juan Bautista, a 19th century Cahuilla leader.

- Head of Canyon 33°36′25.03″N 116°44′35.15″W
- Mouth of Canyon 33°41′41.14″N 116°51′3.47″W
