= Lookout Mountain (Riverside County, California) =

Mountain peak in California, US

- Location within California Location within the United States

Highest point
- Elevation: 5,578 ft (1,700 m)
- Prominence: 630 ft (190 m)
- Coordinates: 33°33′11.60″N 116°34′27.10″W

Geography
- Location: Riverside County, California, United States
- Parent range: San Jacinto Mountains
- Topo map: USGS Butterfly Peak

Lookout Mountain is a summit in the Santa Rosa Mountains in Riverside County, California. It rises to a height of 5,577 feet (1,700 meters).
