= Hamilton School =

Coordinates: 51.4432°N 0.9584°W

Location
- 135 Bulmershe Road; Reading, Berkshire, RG1 5SG; England

Information
- Type: Special school; Academy
- Local authority: Reading Borough Council
- Trust: Maiden Erlegh Trust
- Department for Education URN: 147675 Tables
- Ofsted: Reports
- Gender: Co-educational
- Age: 11 to 18
- Enrolment: 55
- Website: Official website

Hamilton School (formerly Phoenix College) is a coeducational special school located in Reading, Berkshire, England.

The school has 64 places for 11–18 year olds. All students have statements of special educational needs relating to behavioural, social and emotional needs. The school was last inspected in 2024 and judged Good.

Previously a community school administered by Reading Borough Council, in January 2020 Phoenix College converted to academy status and was renamed Hamilton School. The school is now sponsored by the Maiden Erlegh Trust.
