= Temecula Basin =

The Temecula Basin is a sedimentary basin, which, along with the Aguanga Basin, is part of the Elsinore Fault Zone, in southwestern Riverside County, California. The Temecula Basin is a basin of down faulted Mesozoic basement rock, overlain by late Cenozoic continental sediments.

== Aquifer ==
The Temecula Basin is also a local ground water basin and aquifer in southwestern Riverside County. It is the largest groundwater basin in the San Diego water region. This aquifer is recharged by precipitation in the valley, underflow and by surface flow from the creeks draining the surrounding mountains and the southern Perris Block in the watershed of Murrieta Creek and Temecula Creek, tributaries of the Santa Margarita River.

== History ==
In 1919, a USGS Water Supply Paper described the Temecula Basin:

"Throughout the lowland of Murrieta Valley the ground-water level is within 20 ft. of the surface, and beneath the greater part the depth to water is less than 10 ft. . . . The sampled well waters from Murrieta Valley range in quality from fair to good for domestic uses and for irrigation. ... In the lowland along Murrieta Creek for two or three miles above Temecula, the ground-water level is within 6 or 8 ft. of the surface, and the continual evaporation from this moist area has caused the concentration of alkali. Chemical examination of the waters tested indicates that in most of them sodium is the predominant base. . . . Throughout the lowland of Temecula Valley proper ground water is found within 20 ft. of the surface, and in the wide sandy flats of its upper portion is less than 10 ft. below the surface. ... In the minor valleys In the upper part of the Temecula Basin, water is generally found relatively near the surface in the alluvial and residual materials."
