= Temecula Creek =

Temecula Creek Temecula River, Aguanga Creek

Location
- Country: United States
- State: California
- Region: San Diego County, Riverside County
- City: Temecula

Physical characteristics
- Source
  - location: Aguanga Mountain in the Cleveland National Forest, San Diego County
  - coordinates: 33°19′52″N 116°45′27″W
  - elevation: 4,200 ft (1,300 m)
- Mouth: Confluence with Murrieta Creek, forming Santa Margarita River
  - location: 0.5 miles southeast of Temecula, Riverside County
  - coordinates: 33°28′27″N 117°08′27″W
  - elevation: 951 ft (290 m)

Basin features
- Tributaries
  - left: Kohler Canyon, Rattlesnake Creek, Cottonwood Creek, Long Canyon, Kolb Creek, Pechanga Creek
  - right: Chihuahua Creek, Tule Creek, Wilson Creek

Temecula Creek, formerly known as the Temecula River, runs 32.6 miles (52.5 km) through southern Riverside County, California, United States, past the rural communities of Radec and Aguanga, and ending 0.5 miles (0.80 km) southeast of the original city center of Temecula. The creek is filled with boulders and is typically dry and sandy. It is a relatively undeveloped coastal-draining watershed. Until the 1920s, water flowed in Temecula Creek year-round.

== History ==
A Luiseño Indian rancheria named Temeca or Temeko was named as early as 1785. In 1828 Temecula became the name of a rancho of Mission San Luis Rey. Alfred Kroeber noted that the name may be derived from the Luiseño word temet meaning "sun". The village of Temecula originated on a bluff on the south bank of Temecula Creek opposite the old Wolf's Store according to an 1853 survey.

In 1948, the owners of the Vail Ranch built a 132-foot-high (40 m) dam on Temecula Creek, Vail Lake Dam, approximately 10 miles (16 km) above the confluence with the Santa Margarita River. Today the lake is a public recreational use area.

== Watershed ==
Temecula Creek originates on the north slope of Aguanga Mountain, flows northeast 1 mile (1.6 km) to Dodge Valley, where it continues northwest through Dodge Valley, Oak Grove Valley, Dameron Valley, Aguanga Valley, Radec Valley, Butterfield Valley, into Vail Lake Reservoir, after which it flows southwest through Pauba Valley to Temecula Valley where it joins Murrieta Creek. Temecula Creek has a slightly larger drainage area than Murrieta Creek. The Santa Margarita River begins at the confluence of the two creeks at the head of Temecula Canyon.

With the encroachment of homes on both sides of Temecula Creek, portions may be channelized.

== Tributaries ==
- Pechanga Creek
- Vail Lake Dam, Vail Lake
  - Kolb Creek
    - Arroyo Seco Creek
  - Wilson Creek
    - Cahuilla Creek
      - Hamilton Creek (Cahuilla Creek)
- Long Canyon Creek
- Cottonwood Creek
- Tule Creek
- Chihuahua Creek
- Rattlesnake Creek
- Kohler Canyon

== Ecology ==
Biologically diverse, supporting both coastal and desert fauna and flora, it is bounded by the Agua Tibia Wilderness area and the Cleveland National Forest. The creek supports coastal sage scrub, including Jojoba, alluvial fan scrub, mesquite bosque mix, coast live oak woodland, and mature Fremont cottonwood-willow woodland.

In addition to riparian breeders, birds include least Bell's vireo, Nuttall's quail, ladder-backed woodpecker, and California and Gambel's quail. Arroyo southwestern toads are also found in Temecula Creek.

North American beaver (Castor canadensis) may gradually raise the water table and return portions of the stream to perennial flow at sites such as its confluence with Murrieta Creek. However, cattle grazing along Temecula Creek has injured its understory.
