= Temecula, California =

City in California, United States

- City
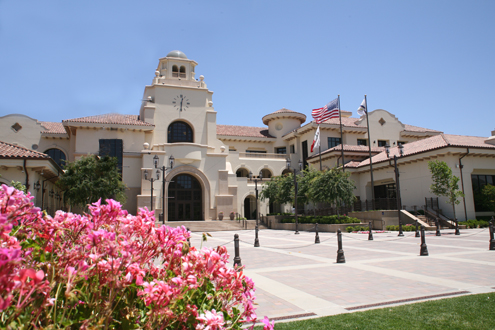
- Temecula City Hall

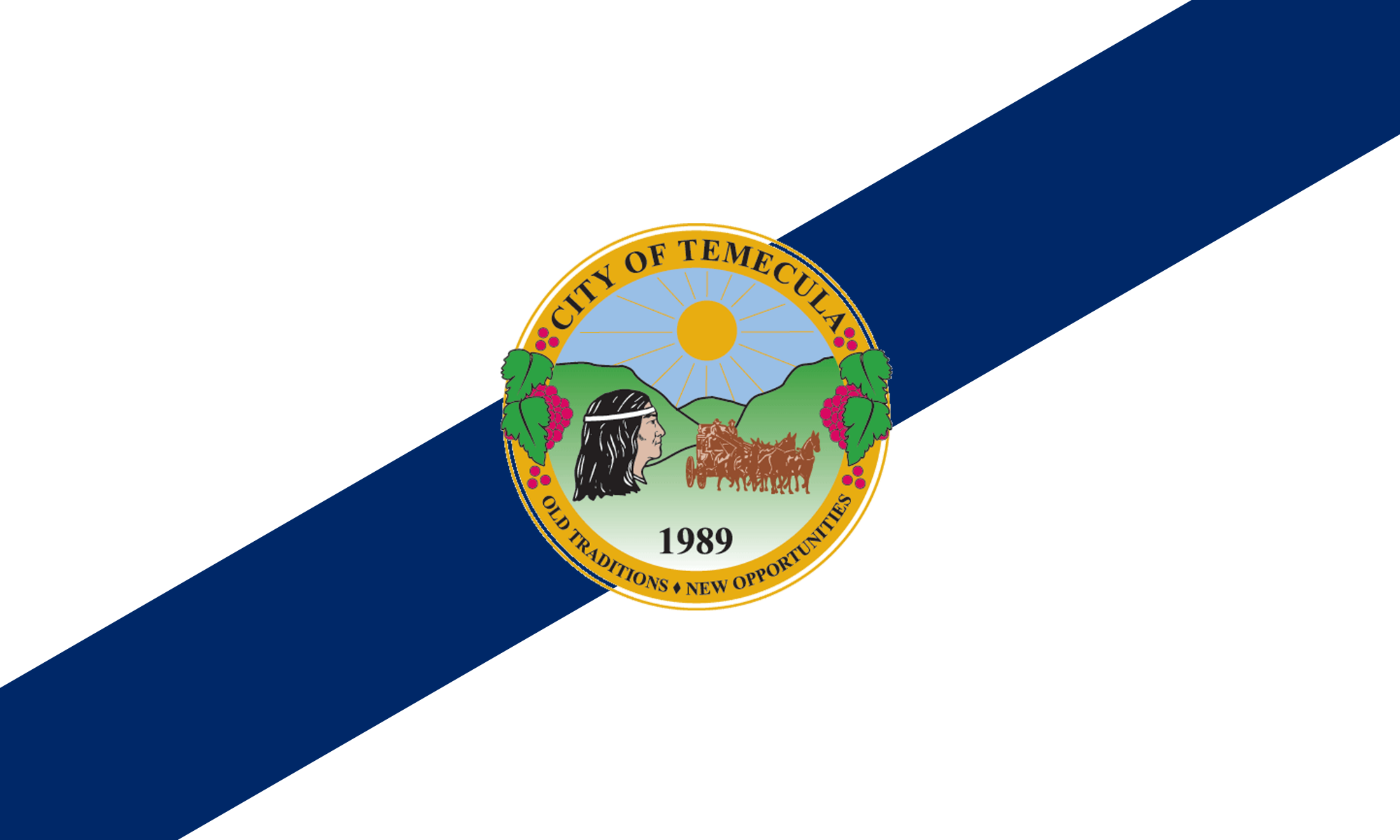
- Flag
- Motto: "Old Traditions, New Opportunities"
- Interactive map of Temecula, California
- Location in the United States
- Coordinates: 33°29′34″N 117°07′53″W
- Country: United States
- State: California
- County: Riverside
- Founded: April 22, 1859; 167 years ago
- Incorporated: December 1, 1989; 36 years ago

Government
  - Type: Council-manager government
  - Mayor: Jessica Alexander
  - Mayor Pro Tem: Matt Rahn
  - City Council: Brenden Kalfus; Zak Schwank; James Stewart
  - City Manager: Aaron Adams

Area
  - City: 37.19 sq mi (96.32 km^{2})
  - Land: 37.18 sq mi (96.30 km^{2})
  - Water: 0.0077 sq mi (0.02 km^{2}) 0.03%
- Elevation: 1,020 ft (310 m)

Population (2020)
  - City: 110,003
  - Estimate (2025): 114,865
  - Rank: 5th in Riverside County; 59th in California; 272nd in the United States
  - Density: 3,005.6/sq mi (1,160.46/km^{2})
  - Urban: 528,991 (US: 81st)
  - Urban density: 3,515/sq mi (1,357.3/km^{2})
- Time zone: UTC−8 (Pacific)
  - Summer (DST): UTC−7 (PDT)
- ZIP Codes: 92589–92593
- Area code: 951
- FIPS code: 06-78120
- GNIS feature IDs: 2412044
- Website: temeculaca.gov

Temecula (Note: /təˈmɛkjʊlə/; Spanish: Temécula, [teˈmekula]; Luiseño: Temeekunga) is a city in southwestern Riverside County, California, United States. The city had a population of 110,003 as of the 2020 census and was incorporated on December 1, 1989. The city is a tourist and resort destination, with the Temecula Valley Wine Country, Old Town Temecula, Pechanga Resort Casino, championship golf courses, and resort accommodations contributing to the city's economic profile.

The city of Temecula, forming the southwestern anchor of the Inland Empire region, is approximately 58 miles (93 km) north of downtown San Diego and 85 miles (137 km) southeast of downtown Los Angeles. Temecula is part of the Greater Los Angeles area. Temecula is bordered by the city of Murrieta to the north and the Pechanga Indian Reservation and San Diego County to the south. Temecula is also the principal city of the Temecula–Murrieta–Menifee, CA urban area, which had a population of 528,991 as of the 2020 census.

== History ==
=== Pre-1800 ===
The area was inhabited by the Temecula Indians for hundreds of years before their contact with the Spanish missionaries (the people are now generally known as the Luiseños, after the nearby Mission San Luis Rey de Francia). Seven bands of Luiseño Indians inhabited the Temecula valley pre-contact: the Pechanga, La Jolla, Soboba, Pala, Rincon, Pauma, and San Luis Rey bands (presently, all of the bands except the San Luis Rey are federally recognized tribes). The Pechanga Band of Luiseño believe their ancestors have lived in the Temecula area for more than 10,000 years, though ethnologists think they arrived at a more recent date. In Pechanga history, life on Earth began in the Temecula Valley. They call it "'Éxva Temeéku", the place of the union of Sky-father, and Earth-mother ("Tuukumit'pi Tamaayowit"). The Temecula Indians ("Temeekuyam") lived at "Temeekunga", or "the place of the sun". Other popular interpretations of the name include "The sun that shines through the mist" or "Where the sun breaks through the mist".

The first recorded Spanish visit occurred in October 1797, with a Franciscan padre, Father Juan Norberto de Santiago, and Captain Pedro Lisalde. Father Santiago kept a journal in which he noted seeing "Temecula ... an Indian village". The trip included the Lake Elsinore area and the Temecula Valley.

=== 1800–1900 ===
Little is known about the early 1800s because Temecula records were destroyed in the fire that followed the 1906 San Francisco earthquake.

In 1798, Spanish missionaries established the Mission of San Luis Rey de Francia and designated the Indians living in the region as "Sanluiseños", shortened to "Luiseños". In the 1820s, the nearby Mission San Antonio de Pala was built.

In mid-1839, Pío Pico petitioned the governor of Mexican California to give him the lands of Temecula, as he had been put in control of secularizing nearby Mission San Luis Rey de Francia and wanted the fertile land to himself. This upset the Luiseños living there, but the Governor gave Pico temporary control over Temecula nonetheless. As Pico was removed from his position for his severe mistreatment of the Luiseños, he still insisted on his owning Temecula, which only inflamed the Luiseños more. In November 1840, the Luiseños of Temecula armed themselves and warned that they'd cause a massive uprising if Pico did not remove his grazing cattle, forcing Pico out of the area.

The Mexican land grants made in the Temecula area were Rancho Temecula, granted to Felix Valdez, and to the east Rancho Pauba, granted to Vicente Moraga in 1844. Rancho Little Temecula was made in 1845 to Luiseño Pablo Apis, one of the few former mission converts to be given a land grant. It was fertile well watered land at the southern end of the valley, which included the village of Temecula. A fourth grant, known as Rancho Santa Rosa, was made to Juan Moreno in 1846, and was in the hills to the west of Temecula.

On December 6, 1846, which became known as the Temecula Massacre, at the Battle of San Pasqual, Andrés Pico led Californios to kill over twenty of U.S. General Stephen W. Kearny's men. Subsequently, in January 1847, José Lugo with Cahuilla Indians came to the Temecula Valley in pursuit of the Luiseño Indians and killed an unknown number, about 40–100 of them, reportedly, in the canyon just west of the current Vail Lake Dam.

As American settlers moved into the area after the war, conflict with the native tribes increased. A treaty was signed in the Magee Store in Temecula in 1852, but was never ratified by the United States Senate. In addition, the Luiseños challenged the Mexican land grant claims, as, under Mexican law, the land was held in trust to be distributed to the local Indian tribes after becoming subjects. They challenged the Apis claim to the Little Temecula Rancho by taking the case to the 1851 California Land Commission. On November 15, 1853, the commission rejected the Luiseño claim; an appeal in 1856 to the district court was found to be in favor of the heirs of Pablo Apis (he had died in late 1853 or early 1854). The Luiseño of Temecula village remained on the south side of Temecula Creek when the Apis grant was acquired by Louis Wolf in 1872; they were evicted in 1875.

A stagecoach line started a local route from Warner Ranch to Colton in 1857 that passed through the Temecula Valley. Within a year, the Butterfield Overland Mail stagecoach line, with a route between St. Louis, Missouri, and San Francisco, stopped at Temecula's Magee Store. On April 22, 1859, the first inland Southern California post office was established in Temecula in the Magee Store. This was the second post office in the state, the first being located in San Francisco. The Temecula post office was moved in the ensuing years; its present locations are the seventh and eighth sites occupied. The American Civil War put an end to the Butterfield Overland Stage Service, but stage service continued on the route under other stage companies until the railroad reached Fort Yuma in 1877.

In 1862, Louis Wolf, a Temecula merchant and postmaster, married Ramona Place, who was mixed-race and half Indian. Author Helen Hunt Jackson spent time with Louis and Ramona Wolf in 1882 and again in 1883. Wolf's store became an inspiration for Jackson's fictional "Hartsel's store" in her 1884 novel, Ramona.

In 1882, the United States government established the Pechanga Indian Reservation of approximately 4,000 acres (16 km^{2}) some 6 miles (9.7 km) from downtown Temecula. Also in 1882, the California Southern Railroad, a subsidiary of the Santa Fe Railroad, completed construction of the section from National City to Temecula. In 1883, the line was extended to San Bernardino. In the late 1880s, a series of floods washed out the tracks and the section of the railroad through the canyon was finally abandoned. The old Temecula station was used as a barn and later demolished.

In the 1890s, with the operation of granite stone quarries, Temecula granite was shaped into fence and hitching posts, curbstones, courthouse steps, and building blocks. At the turn of the 20th century, Temecula became an important shipping point for grain and cattle.

=== 1900–1989 ===
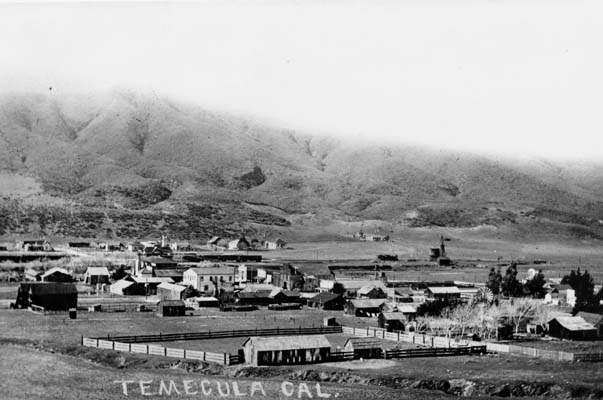
Temecula, 1909

In 1904, Walter Vail, who had come to the United States with his parents from Nova Scotia, migrated to California. Along with various partners, he began buying land in Southern California. Vail bought ranchland in the Temecula Valley, buying 38,000 acres (154 km^{2}) of Rancho Temecula and Rancho Pauba, along with the northern half of Rancho Little Temecula. Vail was killed by a streetcar in Los Angeles in 1906; his son, Mahlon Vail, took over the family ranch. In 1914, financed by Mahlon Vail and local ranchers, the First National Bank of Temecula opened on Front Street. In 1915, the first paved, two-lane county road was built through Temecula.

By 1947, the Vail Ranch contained over 87,500 acres (354 km^{2}). In 1948, the Vail family built a dam to catch the Temecula Creek water and created Vail Lake. Through the mid-1960s, the economy of the Temecula Valley centered around the Vail Ranch; the cattle business and agriculture were the stimuli for most business ventures.

In 1964, the Vail Ranch was sold to the Kaiser—Aetna partnership. A later purchase by the group brought the total area to 97,500 acres (395 km^{2}), and the area became known as Rancho California.

In the 1970 census, the United States Census Bureau enumerated the population of the entire Murrieta-Rancho California-Temecula area at 2,769.

In 1970, the Temecula Town Association, a non-profit, charitable organization, incorporated. In 1977, the present-day Rancho California Water District was formed. On November 5, 1979, KRTM 88.9 FM went on the air in Temecula.

In the 1980 census, 10,215 people were enumerated in the area, a 269 percent increase from the prior census.

In 1984, the Temecula American Viticultural Area (AVA), the official designation for the local wine country (renamed the Temecula Valley AVA in 2004), was established. In 1985, the completion of Interstate 15 between the Greater Los Angeles area and San Diego began a subdivision land boom, making it possible to own a new home in Temecula and have a manageable work commute to San Diego County.

On December 1, 1989, Temecula incorporated as a city, with Ron Parks as the first mayor.

=== 1990–present ===
In 1990, the first United States Census Bureau count of Temecula as a city enumerated 27,099 people. The 1990s brought rapid growth to the Temecula Valley. Many families began moving to the area from San Diego, Los Angeles, and Orange County, drawn by the affordable housing prices and the popular wine country.

In 1995, the Pechanga Pow Wow began.

On October 27, 1999, the Promenade Mall opened in Temecula.

In 2005, Temecula annexed the master-planned community of Redhawk, bringing the population to 90,000. After a period of rapid population growth and home construction, the 2007 subprime mortgage financial crisis and the resultant United States housing market correction caused a sharp rise in home foreclosures in the Temecula-Murrieta region.

In 2012, the city and the Pechanga tribe successfully blocked a proposal by Granite Construction to construct a rock quarry south of the city. The Pechanga tribe purchased the 365-acre (1.48 km^{2}) site for $3 million, now known as Pu’éska Mountain.

In 2013, the 140-bed Temecula Valley Hospital opened, providing the city with a full range of hospital services.

In 2016, the Vail Headquarters historic district opened in the Redhawk Towne Center shopping center, repurposing several historic buildings such as the Wolf Store for retail, dining, and entertainment uses.

== Geography ==
According to the United States Census Bureau, the city has a total area of 37.19 square miles (96.3 km^{2}), of which 37.18 square miles (96.3 km^{2}) is land and 0.012 square miles (0.031 km^{2}), or 0.03%, is water. South of the city, Murrieta Creek and Temecula Creek join to form the Santa Margarita River. The city is located near the border between the counties of Riverside and San Diego, and is also around 90 miles (140 km) from Los Angeles, making it a popular tourist destination for San Diegans and Angelinos.

=== Climate ===
Temecula has a hot semi-arid climate (Köppen: BSh). August is typically the hottest month of the year with December being the coldest month. Most precipitation occurs from November to March with February being the wettest month. Winter storms generally bring moderate precipitation, but strong winter storms are not uncommon, especially during "El Niño" years. The driest month is June. Annual precipitation is 13.05 inches (331 mm). Morning marine layer is common during May and June. From July to September, Temecula experiences hot, dry weather with the occasional North American monsoonal flow that increases the humidity and brings isolated thunderstorms. Most of the storms tend to be short-lived with little rainfall. During late fall into winter, Temecula experiences strong, dry northeastern Santa Ana winds. Snowfall is rare, but Temecula has experienced traces of snowfall on occasion, some as recently as December 2014. A rare F1 tornado touched down in a Temecula neighborhood on February 19, 2005.

Climate data for Temecula, California
Month	Jan	Feb	Mar	Apr	May	Jun	Jul	Aug	Sep	Oct	Nov	Dec	Year
Record high °F (°C)	91 (33)	95 (35)	103 (39)	109 (43)	109 (43)	114 (46)	117 (47)	118 (48)	117 (47)	110 (43)	98 (37)	90 (32)	118 (48)
Mean maximum °F (°C)	79.8 (26.6)	81.9 (27.7)	86.4 (30.2)	92.8 (33.8)	97.8 (36.6)	104.8 (40.4)	108.0 (42.2)	108.2 (42.3)	106.0 (41.1)	98.4 (36.9)	88.7 (31.5)	80.9 (27.2)	110.9 (43.8)
Mean daily maximum °F (°C)	65.3 (18.5)	66.3 (19.1)	69.5 (20.8)	74.1 (23.4)	81.0 (27.2)	90.0 (32.2)	96.7 (35.9)	97.6 (36.4)	92.2 (33.4)	82.5 (28.1)	73.2 (22.9)	65.0 (18.3)	79.5 (26.4)
Daily mean °F (°C)	52.8 (11.6)	54.0 (12.2)	57.7 (14.3)	61.6 (16.4)	67.8 (19.9)	74.3 (23.5)	80.3 (26.8)	81.3 (27.4)	77.2 (25.1)	68.1 (20.1)	59.0 (15.0)	52.6 (11.4)	65.6 (18.6)
Mean daily minimum °F (°C)	40.9 (4.9)	42.2 (5.7)	44.4 (6.9)	47.7 (8.7)	52.8 (11.6)	58.3 (14.6)	64.1 (17.8)	64.8 (18.2)	61.2 (16.2)	52.9 (11.6)	43.9 (6.6)	40.5 (4.7)	51.8 (11.0)
Mean minimum °F (°C)	27.5 (−2.5)	29.4 (−1.4)	32.7 (0.4)	37.2 (2.9)	43.8 (6.6)	48.3 (9.1)	53.8 (12.1)	55.2 (12.9)	50.8 (10.4)	41.4 (5.2)	34.7 (1.5)	27.8 (−2.3)	26.2 (−3.2)
Record low °F (°C)	15 (−9)	19 (−7)	24 (−4)	24 (−4)	31 (−1)	35 (2)	41 (5)	40 (4)	35 (2)	25 (−4)	20 (−7)	17 (−8)	15 (−9)
Average precipitation inches (mm)	3.22 (82)	3.74 (95)	2.29 (58)	.95 (24)	.35 (8.9)	.07 (1.8)	.09 (2.3)	.05 (1.3)	.14 (3.6)	.58 (15)	.96 (24)	2.10 (53)	13.05 (331)
Average snowfall inches (cm)	0.2 (0.51)	0.0 (0.0)	0.0 (0.0)	0.0 (0.0)	0.0 (0.0)	0.0 (0.0)	0.0 (0.0)	0.0 (0.0)	0.0 (0.0)	0.0 (0.0)	0.0 (0.0)	0.3 (0.76)	0.5 (1.27)
Source: wrcc.dri.edu

== Demographics ==
Historical population
Census	Pop.	Note	%±
1980	1,783		—
1990	27,099		1,419.9%
2000	57,716		113.0%
2010	100,097		73.4%
2020	110,003		9.9%
2025 (est.)	114,865	▲	4.4%
U.S. Decennial Census

Historical racial profile	2020	2010	2000	1990	1980
White	55.6%	70.8%	78.9%	90.7%	92.5%
—Non-Hispanic (NH)	49.3%	57.2%	69.3%	80.8%	84.0%
Black or African American (NH)	4.4%	3.8%	3.2%	1.5%	0.0%
Hispanic or Latino (of any race)	27.6%	24.7%	19.0%	14.2%	13.7%
Asian (NH)	11.0%	9.5%	4.6%	2.4%	-
American Indian (NH)	0.7%	0.7%	0.6%	0.5%	-
Other (NH)	7.0%	4.1%	3.3%	0.6%	2.3%

Temecula city, California – Racial and ethnic composition Note: the US Census treats Hispanic/Latino as an ethnic category. This table excludes Latinos from the racial categories and assigns them to a separate category. Hispanics/Latinos may be of any race.
Race / Ethnicity (NH = Non-Hispanic)	Pop 2000	Pop 2010	Pop 2020	% 2000	% 2010	% 2020
White alone (NH)	40,007	57,246	54,222	69.32%	57.19%	49.29%
Black or African American alone (NH)	1,874	3,794	4,814	3.25%	3.79%	4.38%
Native American or Alaska Native alone (NH)	321	655	804	0.56%	0.65%	0.73%
Asian alone (NH)	2,667	9,524	12,051	4.62%	9.51%	10.96%
Native Hawaiian or Pacific Islander alone (NH)	152	319	389	0.26%	0.32%	0.35%
Other Race alone (NH)	81	158	628	0.14%	0.16%	0.57%
Mixed race or Multiracial (NH)	1,640	3,674	6,729	2.84%	3.67%	6.12%
Hispanic or Latino (any race)	10,974	24,727	30,366	19.01%	24.70%	27.60%
Total	57,716	100,097	110,003	100.00%	100.00%	100.00%

=== 2020 ===
The 2020 United States census reported that Temecula had a population of 110,003. The population density was 2,951.8 inhabitants per square mile (1,139.7/km^{2}). The racial makeup was 55.6% White, 4.38% African American, 1.5% Native American, 11.3% Asian, 0.4% Pacific Islander, 10.2% from other races, and 16.3% from two or more races. Hispanic or Latino of any race were 27.6% of the population.

The census reported that 99.8% of the population lived in households, 0.0% lived in non-institutionalized group quarters, and 0.1% were institutionalized.

There were 35,869 households, out of which 42.0% included children under the age of 18, 61.2% were married-couple households, 5.4% were cohabiting couple households, 21.1% had a female householder with no partner present, and 12.3% had a male householder with no partner present. 15.0% of households were one person, and 6.2% were one person aged 65 or older. The average household size was 3.06. There were 28,755 families (80.2% of all households).

The age distribution was 26.0% under the age of 18, 9.3% aged 18 to 24, 25.5% aged 25 to 44, 26.7% aged 45 to 64, and 12.5% who were 65 years of age or older. The median age was 37.0 years. For every 100 females, there were 94.8 males.

There were 37,170 housing units at an average density of 997.4 units per square mile (385.1 units/km^{2}), of which 35,869 (96.5%) were occupied. Of these, 65.4% were owner-occupied, and 34.6% were occupied by renters.

In 2023, the US Census Bureau estimated that the median household income was $117,840, and the per capita income was $44,826. About 5.2% of families and 7.4% of the population were below the poverty line.

=== 2010 ===
As of 2010 Temecula had a population of 100,097. The population density was 3,318 inhabitants per square mile (1,281/km^{2}). The racial makeup of Temecula was 70,880 (70.8%) White (57.2% Non-Hispanic White), 4,132 (4.1%) African American, 1,079 (1.1%) Native American, 9,765 (9.8%) Asian, 368 (0.4%) Pacific Islander, 7,928 (7.9%) from other races, and 5,945 (5.9%) from two or more races. There were 24,727 people of Hispanic or Latino origin, of any race (24.7%).

The Census reported that 99,968 people (99.9% of the population) lived in households, 121 (0.1%) lived in non-institutionalized group quarters, and eight (0%) were institutionalized.

There were 31,781 households, out of which 15,958 (50.2%) had children under the age of 18 living in them, 20,483 (64.5%) were opposite-sex married couples living together, 3,763 (11.8%) had a female householder with no husband present, 1,580 (5.0%) had a male householder with no wife present. There were 1,463 (4.6%) unmarried opposite-sex partnerships, and 186 (0.6%) same-sex married couples or partnerships. 4,400 households (13.8%) were made up of individuals, and 1,387 (4.4%) had someone living alone who was 65 years of age or older. The average household size was 3.15. There were 25,826 families (81.3% of all households); the average family size was 3.46.

The population was spread out, with 30,690 people (30.7%) under the age of 18, 9,317 people (9.3%) aged 18 to 24, 27,869 people (27.8%) aged 25 to 44, 24,416 people (24.4%) aged 45 to 64, and 7,805 people (7.8%) who were 65 years of age or older. The median age was 33.4 years. For every 100 females, there were 95.9 males. For every 100 females age 18 and over, there were 93.9 males.

There were 34,004 housing units at an average density of 1,127.2 units per square mile (435.2 units/km^{2}), of which 21,984 (69.2%) were owner-occupied, and 9,797 (30.8%) were occupied by renters. The homeowner vacancy rate was 2.7%; the rental vacancy rate was 7.1%. 69,929 people (69.9% of the population) lived in owner-occupied housing units and 30,039 people (30.0%) lived in rental housing units.

The U.S. Census Bureau's American Community Survey reported an estimated 1.5% of the population of Temecula's working force, or 1,085 individuals, were involved with the U.S. Armed Forces as of 2011. This figure is slightly higher than the 2011 estimated national average of 0.5%.

During 2013–2017, Temecula had a median household income of $87,115, with 6.8% of the population living below the federal poverty line. In 2017, Temecula had an estimated average household income of $97,573. According to the Temecula Office of Economic Development, the city has an actual average household income of $103,945 in 2019.

According to the United States Census Bureau, the percentage of city residents holding a bachelor's degree or higher during 2013–2017 was 32.1%.

== Economy ==
Supported by high median and mean income levels, the city is a prominent tourist destination, with the Temecula Valley Wine Country, Old Town Temecula, the Temecula Valley Polo Club, the Temecula Valley Balloon & Wine Festival, the Temecula Valley International Film Festival, championship golf courses, and resorts. Other key economic sectors are education, professional, finance, and retail.

=== Top employers ===
As of June 2025, the top ten employers in Temecula were:

#	Employer	# of Employees
1	Temecula Valley Unified School District	3,238
2	Abbott Laboratories	1,793
3	Temecula Valley Hospital	1,344
4	FFF Enterprises	700
5	Milgard Manufacturing Inc.	530
6	Walmart	510
7	Costco Wholesale	500
8	Southwest Traders, Inc.	467
9	The Scotts Company	405
10	Millipore Sigma	370

== Tourism ==
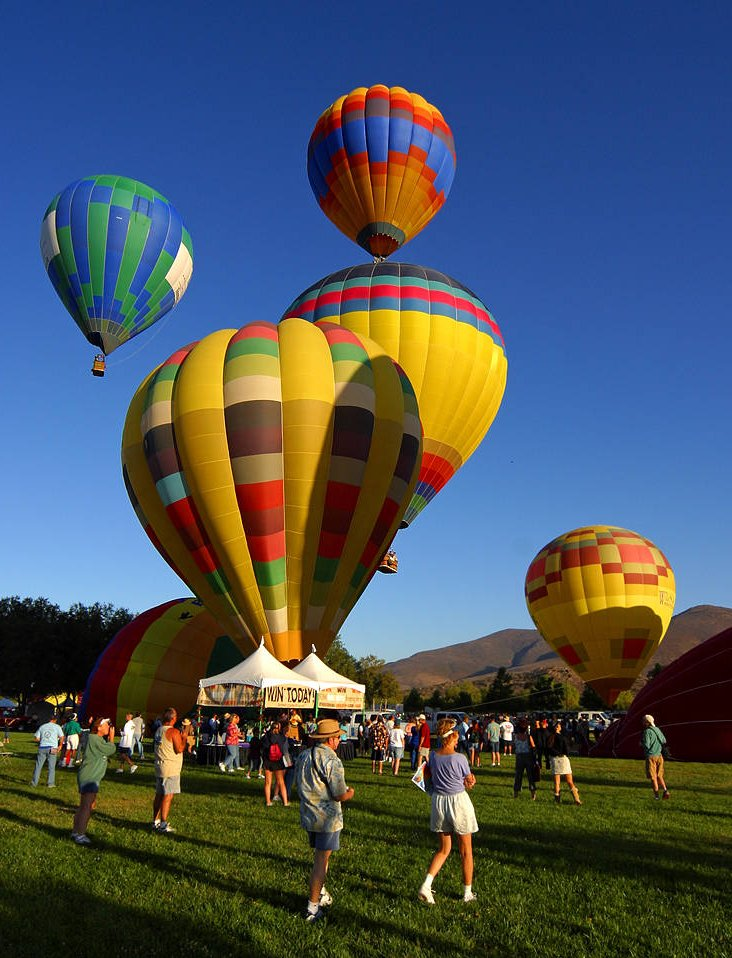
Temecula Valley Balloon and Wine Festival

=== Wine Country ===
The Temecula Valley Wine Country, whose first commercial winegrapes were planted in 1967, features nearly 50 wineries, many tasting rooms, and more than 3,500 acres (14 km^{2}) of producing vineyards. The wine country is located east of the Temecula city limits. The annual Temecula Valley Balloon & Wine Festival, held at nearby Lake Skinner, offers live entertainment, hot air balloon rides, and wine tasting.

=== Old Town Temecula ===
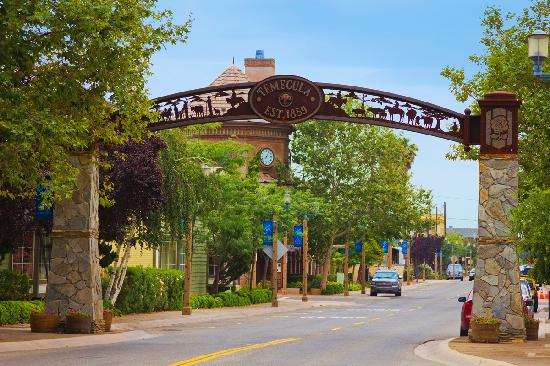
Old Town Temecula

Old Town Temecula, the city's downtown district, is a collection of historic buildings, hotels, museums, event centers, specialty food stores, restaurants, boutiques, gift and collectible stores, and antique dealers. On Saturdays, Old Town has an outdoor farmers' market featuring approximately 70 to 80 local vendors. Old Town is also home to special events including the Rod Run car show, Fourth of July Parade, Outdoor Quilt Show, and Santa's Electric Parade Show. Old Town also hosts a growing nightlife.

Old Town is also home to the Temecula Valley Museum, which features exhibits about the local band of Native Americans and the local natural history and city development. The City Hall is located in the center of Old Town.

Old Town has the Old Town Temecula Community Theater, a 354-seat proscenium theater as well as The Merc, a 48-seat blackbox performance venue adjacent to the main theater.

=== Pechanga Resort Casino ===
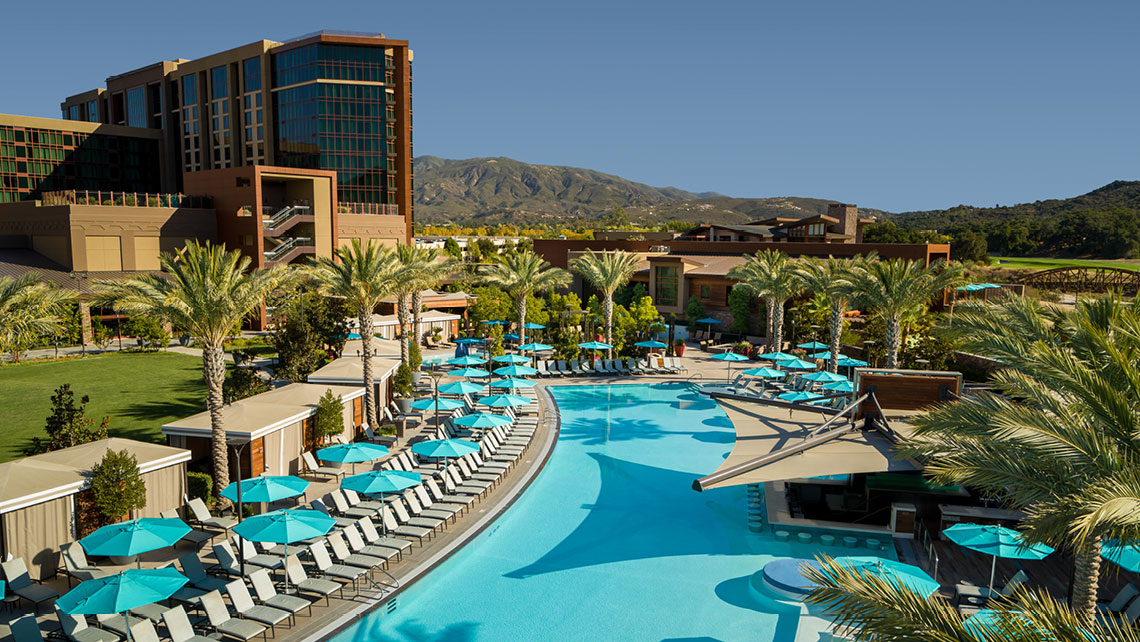
The Pechanga Resort Casino

In 2002, the Pechanga Band of Luiseño Indians opened the $262 million Pechanga Resort Casino outside of the city limits. It employs 5,000 people and is Temecula Valley's largest employer.

=== Festivals ===
- Temecula Rod Run
- Old Town Temecula Outdoor Quilt Show
- Pechanga Wine Festival & Chocolate Decadence
- Pechanga Sushi & Sake Festival
- Pechanga Taco & Tequila Festival

== Sports ==
Temecula is home to the Temecula Valley Inline Hockey Association (TVIHA), a local inline hockey organization that provides school and recreational programs.

Temecula is also known as the home for the Freestyle Motocross group Metal Mulisha with members such as Brian Deegan, Jeremy "Twitch" Stenberg, and Ronnie Faisst living in or near Temecula.

Since 2012, Temecula has also been home to the Wine Town Rollers (WTR) roller derby league.

Temecula is home to a semi-pro soccer team, Temecula FC (also known as the Quails). The area used to have another semi-pro soccer team, the Murrieta Bandits, in the 2000s.

Boxing and Mixed martial arts fight cards are held at Pechanga Resort & Casino.

Temecula has 41 parks, 22 miles (35 km) of trails, and 14 major community facilities. In 2013, it was named a Bronze Level Bicycle Friendly Community and it was named a Playful City USA. Temecula's Pennypickle's Workshop was a winner of Nickelodeon's Parents' Picks Award for "Best Museum" and "Best Kids' Party Place".

Temecula's sports parks include the Ronald Reagan Sports Park (formerly the Rancho California Sports Park) and the Patricia H. Birdsall Sports Park.

== Government and politics ==
Temecula presidential election results
Year	Democratic	Republican	Third Parties
2024	43.50% (22,957)	53.84% (28,410)	2.66% (1,405)
2020	44.96% (24,734)	52.62% (28,947)	2.42% (1,328)
2016	38.18% (15,806)	55.67% (23,045)	6.15% (2,543)
2012	36.83% (13,603)	61.05% (22,549)	2.12% (783)
2008	40.65% (14,209)	57.87% (20,231)	1.48% (518)
2004	30.27% (8,330)	68.95% (18,977)	0.78% (216)
2000	32.93% (6,513)	64.25% (12,702)	2.82% (557)

Federal:

- In the United States House of Representatives, Temecula is in California's 48th congressional district, represented by Republican Darrell Issa.

State:

- In the California State Legislature, Temecula is in the 32nd senatorial district, represented by Republican Kelly Seyarto, and in the 71st Assembly district, represented by Republican Kate Sanchez.

Local:

- In the Riverside County Board of Supervisors, Temecula is in the Third District, represented by Chuck Washington.

=== City council ===
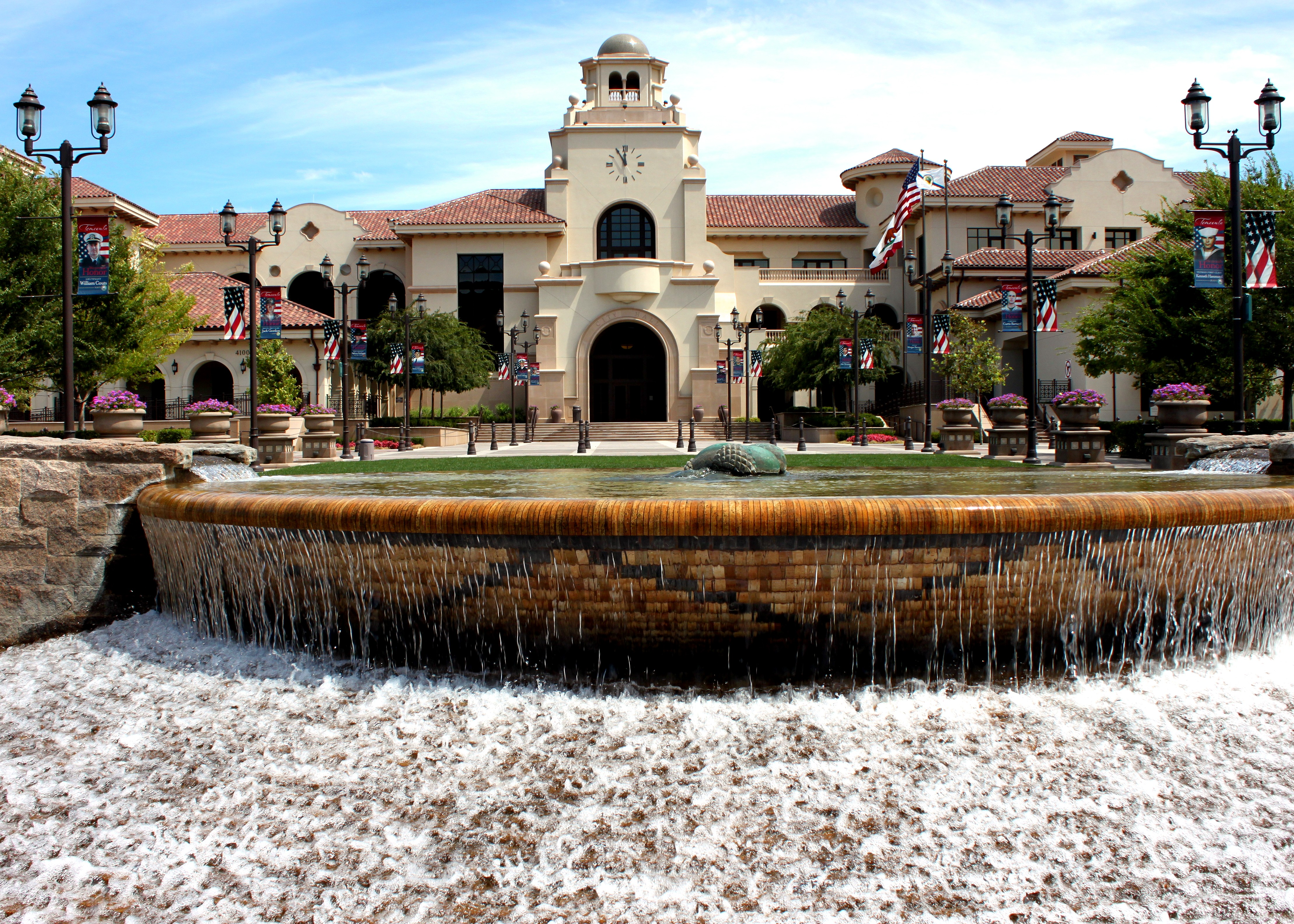
Temecula City Hall, designed in a Mission Revival style

As of March 2026, Temecula is governed by a five member, non-partisan board. Temecula's mayor serves a one-year term, and is appointed annually by the city council (a council-member is typically chosen). As of 2026, Jessica Alexander serves as the current mayor of the city.

During the 2025 elections, the city council voted 4-1 to oppose Proposition 50.

=== Voter registration ===
As of February 2025, Temecula has 71,098 registered voters. Among these, Republicans hold the plurality of registrations.

Party	Registered voters
American Independent	4,033
Democratic	21,682
Green	284
Libertarian Party	1,063
Peace and Freedom Party	296
Republican	27,777
No Party preference (Independent)	15,215
Unknown/Other	748

== Education ==
=== Public schools ===
Public schools in Temecula are operated by the Temecula Valley Unified School District (TVUSD), whose schools are consistently ranked as having the highest Academic Performance Indices within Riverside County. Great Oak, Chaparral, and Temecula Valley high schools have all received silver medals in the U.S. News Best High Schools rankings awarded by U.S. News & World Report.

The district's general boundaries extend north to French Valley, south to the Riverside/San Diego county line, east to Vail Lake, and west to the Temecula city limit. The district covers approximately 148 square miles (383 km^{2}), with an enrollment of over 28,000 students.

=== Private schools ===
- Concord Lutheran Academy
- Linfield Christian School
- Rancho Christian School
- Saint Jeanne de Lestonnac School
- Van Avery Prep

=== Charter schools ===
- Julian Charter School of Temecula
- River Springs Charter School
- Temecula International Academy
- Temecula Preparatory School
- Temecula Valley Charter School

=== Higher education ===
Temecula is home to Mt. San Jacinto College, a public community college. Mt. San Jacinto College relocated from a smaller site west of Interstate 15 after purchasing two 5-story buildings from Abbott Laboratories in 2018. The first phase of the nearly 350,000-square-foot (33,000 m^{2}) campus opened in August 2021.

Temecula is also home to a satellite campus for California State University San Marcos (CSUSM), which offers several online and certificate programs. National University, University of Redlands, Concordia University, and San Joaquin Valley College also have education centers in Temecula. Temecula is also home to Professional Golfers Career College, a vocational school for those wishing to enter the golf industry.

== Transportation ==
=== Highways ===
The Temecula area is served by two major highways: Interstate 15 and State Route 79.

Interstate 15 has three full interchanges in Temecula, and a fourth, French Valley Parkway, is partially constructed, with only the southbound off-ramp completed. Construction has begun on a set of additional northbound lanes that would eliminate weaving near the planned interchange between Winchester Road and the I-15/I-215 split, but completion of the interchange itself, and the collector-distributor lane system that accompanies it, is not anticipated for several more years.

State Route 79 enters the Temecula area after passing Vail Lake, paralleling Temecula Creek for several miles, and it becomes a six-lane, city-maintained thoroughfare known as Temecula Parkway before it overlaps with Interstate 15. It leaves the freeway three miles (5 km) later as Winchester Road (which is maintained by the city until it reaches the northern city limits) and continues north toward the cities of Hemet, San Jacinto, and Beaumont.

Major west-east thoroughfares in the city include Murrieta Hot Springs Road, Nicholas Road, Rancho California Road, Pauba Road, and Temecula Parkway. Major north-south thoroughfares include Jefferson Avenue, Ynez Road, Margarita Road, Meadows Parkway, and Butterfield Stage Road. Pechanga Parkway, which runs through the southwest portion of the city, carries the routing of County Route S16, although it is not signed as such within the city limits.

=== Public transportation ===
The Riverside Transit Agency bus system serves the Temecula area with Routes 23, 24, 55, 61, 79, 202, 205, 206, 208, and 217, as well as connections to Greyhound Lines.

The possibility of extending Metrolink's 91/Perris Valley Line from South Perris to Temecula was considered in a 2005 feasibility study, which would have the extension run along either Winchester Road or Interstate 215, though this extension was never created.

=== Airports ===
The French Valley Airport is located in the Temecula Valley. Temecula is also located within 60 miles (97 km) of both the Ontario International Airport, McClellan–Palomar Airport in Carlsbad, California and San Diego International Airport.

== Public services ==
=== Cemetery ===
The Temecula Cemetery is operated by the Temecula Public Cemetery District. Land for the cemetery was originally donated by Mercedes Pujol in 1884 from the estate of her husband, Domingo Pujol.

=== Health care ===
Temecula is home to Temecula Valley Hospital, a five-story, 140-bed hospital that opened in October 2013. Temecula Valley Hospital is a member of Universal Health Services.

Kaiser Permanente and UC San Diego Health both offer services in Temecula.

=== Public libraries ===
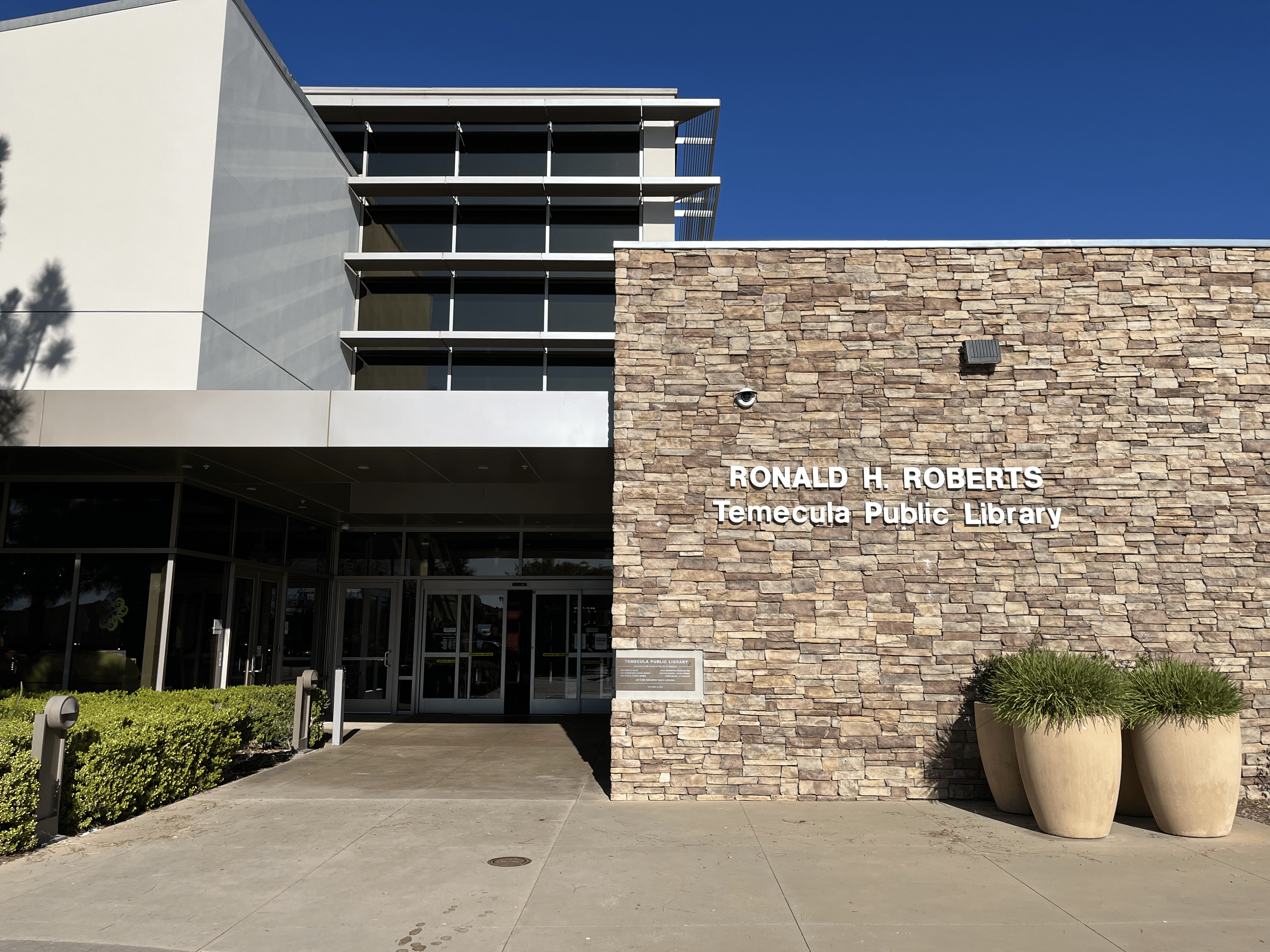
Ronald H. Roberts Temecula Public Library

- Grace Mellman Community Library
- Ronald H. Roberts Temecula Public Library

=== Public safety ===
Police service in Temecula is provided in cooperation with the Riverside County Sheriff's Department via a contract with the department fulfilled through its Southwest Sheriff's Station, located in the unincorporated community of French Valley, just north of the city of Temecula, east of State Route 79 (Winchester Road). The station is adjacent to the Riverside County Superior Court's Southwest Regional Judicial District Courthouse and Southwest Detention Center, one of the five regional jails in Riverside County. The sheriff's station is currently commanded by Captain Lisa McConnell, who also serves as Temecula's Chief of Police.

The city of Temecula contracts for fire and paramedic services with the Riverside County Fire Department through a cooperative agreement with CAL FIRE. Temecula currently has five fire stations with five paramedic engine companies, one truck company and two CAL FIRE wildland fire engines.

American Medical Response provides paramedic ambulance transport to an emergency department.

== Places of worship ==
The Temecula area is home to dozens of places of worship and various religious denominations, including:

- Calvary Chapel Bible Church, a 35,000-square-foot (3,300 m^{2}) church and cultural center located in the Temecula Valley Wine Country.
- Chabad of Temecula, a Jewish synagogue and community center serving all Jews regardless of affiliation.
- The Church of Jesus Christ of Latter-day Saints, representing what is thought to be the largest Mormon percentage community in California, the legacy of the San Bernardino LDS (Mormon) colony and settlement of the San Diego Mountain Empire as a part of the proposed State of Deseret in the second half of the 19th century.
- The Islamic Center of Temecula Valley, which is located in the northeastern part of the city.
- Reliance Church, located on Santiago Road east of Old Town Temecula. The church is built on the site of Temecula's first schoolhouse, which was built in 1889. The schoolhouse was converted into a chapel in 1915 and is still in use as part of the church.
- St. Catherine of Alexandria Catholic Parish, which was established in 1910 with a chapel built in Old Town Temecula in 1917. To make space for its growing congregation, the parish relocated and sold its former chapel (now known as the Chapel of Memories) to the Old Town Museum for a dollar.

== Sister cities ==
- Nakayama-Daisen (Japan; since 1994)
- Leidschendam-Voorburg (Netherlands; 1993–2019)

Temecula maintains international relations with Daisen, Tottori in Japan. Until 2019, the city also maintained international relations with Leidschendam-Voorburg in the Netherlands.

The city dedicated a Japanese Garden at the Temecula Duck Pond to honor the 10th anniversary of their relationship with sister city Daisen.

The Temecula Duck Pond is also home to an art piece entitled "Singing in the Rain". It was commissioned by the city of Leidschendam-Voorburg as a gift to the city to commemorate the resilient American spirit in the aftermath of the September 11 attacks. The piece depicts a mother and her children bravely pedaling a bicycle into the strong headwinds of a storm.

== Notable people ==
- Nate Adams, freestyle motocross rider
- Ally Beardsley, improv comedian
- Tim Barela, author of the comic strip Leonard & Larry
- Maurice Benard, actor
- Rob Brantly, Major League Baseball catcher, attended Chaparral High School
- Carolesdaughter, singer-songwriter and musician
- Allen Craig, former Major League Baseball first baseman and outfielder for the St. Louis Cardinals and Boston Red Sox, caught last out of the 2011 World Series
- Timmy Curran, professional surfer
- Terrell Davis, retired Denver Broncos Pro Bowl running back
- Brian Deegan, freestyle motocross rider and founder of Metal Mulisha, had an estate in Temecula; he put it up for sale in 2020
- Hailie Deegan, NASCAR driver and daughter of Brian Deegan
- Ronnie Faisst, professional freestyle motocross and snow bikecross rider
- Larry Fortensky, last husband of Elizabeth Taylor
- Andy Fraser, songwriter and musician
- Erle Stanley Gardner, author, wrote over 100 of the Perry Mason novels at his Temecula ranch, "Rancho del Paisano" between 1931 and his death in 1970
- Howard Scott Gentry (1903–1993), botanist
- Easton Gibbs, Former American Football Linebacker
- Sarah Hammer, professional racing cyclist and two-time Olympic silver medalist
- Christy Hemme, professional wrestler and manager
- Dan Henderson, mixed martial artist and Greco-Roman wrestling Olympian
- Reed Johnson, Major League Baseball outfielder
- Tori Kelly, singer and songwriter
- Troy Lyndon, CEO of Inspired Media Entertainment and developer of the first 3D Madden NFL game
- Alex Mahan, creator of the video game Yandere Simulator
- Cindy Marina, model who was crowned Miss Universe Albania 2019
- Margaret Martin, professional bodybuilder
- Julie Masi, member of the Parachute Club music group, resided in Temecula 1990–2005
- Sydnee Michaels, LPGA Tour golfer
- Trevi Moran, YouTuber and X-Factor contestant 2012
- Dean Norris, actor, best known for his role in Breaking Bad
- Antonio Pontarelli, rock violinist, and grand champion of PAX TV's America's Most Talented Kids
- Brooks Pounders, Major League Baseball pitcher
- Olivia Rodrigo, actress and singer-songwriter
- Stan Sakai, creator of Usagi Yojimbo
- Jeremy "Twitch" Stenberg, professional freestyle motocross rider and professional off-road truck racer
- Justin Simon (born 1996), basketball player for Bnei Herzliya of the Israeli Basketball Premier League until November 2023
- Taylor Tomlinson, stand-up comedian and podcaster
- Mark Towle, automobile customizer
- Kelsie Whitmore, professional baseball player
- Cassidy Wolf, model who was crowned Miss California Teen USA 2013 and Miss Teen USA 2013
- Xenia, singer, appeared on Season 1 of The Voice
- Jerry Yang, 2007 World Series of Poker Main Event winner

== See also ==
- Temecula Creek
- Temecula Valley
- Temecula Valley AVA
