= Walter Vail =

American businessman and politician (1852–1906)

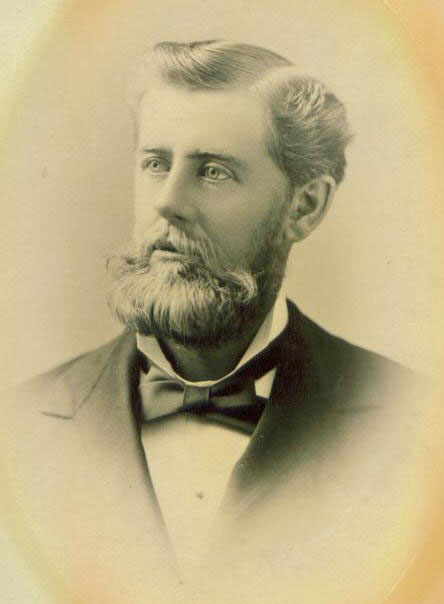
- Vail in 1882
- Born: Walter Lennox Vail; May 13, 1852; Liverpool, Nova Scotia
- Died: December 2, 1906 (aged 54); Los Angeles, California
- Burial place: Hollywood Forever Cemetery
- Occupations: Cattle dealer, businessman, politician and ranch owner
- Years active: 1876-1906
- Spouse: Margaret "Maggie" Newhall
- Children: 5
- Awards: Inducted into the Hall of Great Westerners

10th Arizona Territorial Legislature
- In office 1879–1880

Signature
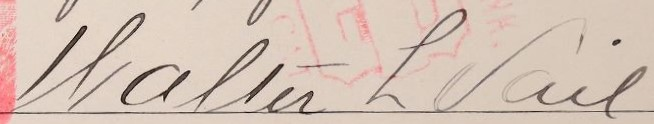

Walter Lennox Vail (May 13, 1852 – December 2, 1906) was an American businessman, cattle dealer, and politician. He is known for his Empire Land & Cattle Company (later the Vail Company), which spanned over one million acres throughout five states. Vail has been called "a pivotal figure in early California and Arizona ranching."

== Early life ==
Vail was born in Liverpool, Nova Scotia on May 13, 1852, to Mahlon Vail, Sr. and Eliza Vail.

== Career ==
=== Empire Ranch ===
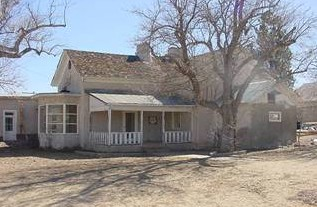
The headquarters of the Empire Ranch in the modern day

Vail left his family's Plainfield, New Jersey house in the middle of 1875 to pursue riches in the West. He worked for a few months in Virginia City, Nevada as a mine's timekeeper, but in November he wrote of his intention to get involved in Arizona's sheep business. He, along with an Englishman named Herbert R. Hislop, then purchased the Empire Ranch along with its 612 cattle on August 22, 1876. The purchase from Edward Nye Fish and Simon Silverberg cost $1,174 at the time and was only 0.25 square miles (0.65 km^{2}). Vail had met Hislop for the first time in August of that year, at the Lick House in San Francisco. Vail also became the main shareholder of the Empire Land & Cattle Company, which was formed in 1882.

=== Politics ===
Vail additionally served in the House of Representatives on the 10th Arizona Territorial Legislature for two years, starting in 1879. He was one of five representatives from Pima County. There, he proposed the creation of Apache County in the northeast. In 1884, Vail was elected to the Arizona Stock Growers Association, where he introduced many laws relating to cattle farming.

=== California ===
Vail moved his main operations to California in the late 1880s due to a long drought in Arizona. He started leasing Californian land mainly in Temecula Valley, but established his headquarters in downtown Los Angeles. By this time, he had already bought four ranches: the northern half of Rancho Little Temecula, Rancho Pauba, Rancho Santa Rosa, and Rancho Temecula. Later, Vail would own over 135 square miles (350 km^{2}) surrounding the city of Temecula. He also leased Santa Catalina Island and Santa Rosa Island in 1892 and 1901, respectively. Vail, along with Carroll W. Gates and J.V. Vickers, set up the Panhandle Pasture Company, which bought about 22 square miles (57 km^{2}) in Sherman County, Texas and Beaver County, Oklahoma.

== Personal life ==
Vail married Margaret "Maggie" (Note: Other sources, such as this one refer to Newhall as "Maggie" instead of Margaret.) Newhall in 1881, with them having five children: Nathan Russel, Mahlon, Mary, Walter Lennox Jr., and William Banning (who used his middle name) together.

In 1890, a Gila monster bit Vail on his middle finger, and for years thereafter he experienced bleeding and swelling in his throat, which was thought to be caused by the venom from the bite.

== Death ==
Vail died at 54 on December 2, 1906, due to complications from a tram accident in Los Angeles. He was cremated, then buried at the Hollywood Forever Cemetery on December 6.

== Legacy ==
Vail's sons took over the company after his death, renaming it to the Vail Company. The Empire Ranch was sold in 1928, and the Temecula ranches were bought by a syndicate of companies, including Kaiser Aluminum, Kaiser Industries, and Macco Realties in 1965. Santa Rosa Island was acquired by the National Park Service in 1986, and ranching ceased in 1998.

Vail was inducted into the Hall of Great Westerners at the National Cowboy & Western Heritage Museum in 2018. Various properties have been named after the Vail family including: Vail Headquarters, an outdoor shopping mall, Vail Lake, and Vail, Arizona.
