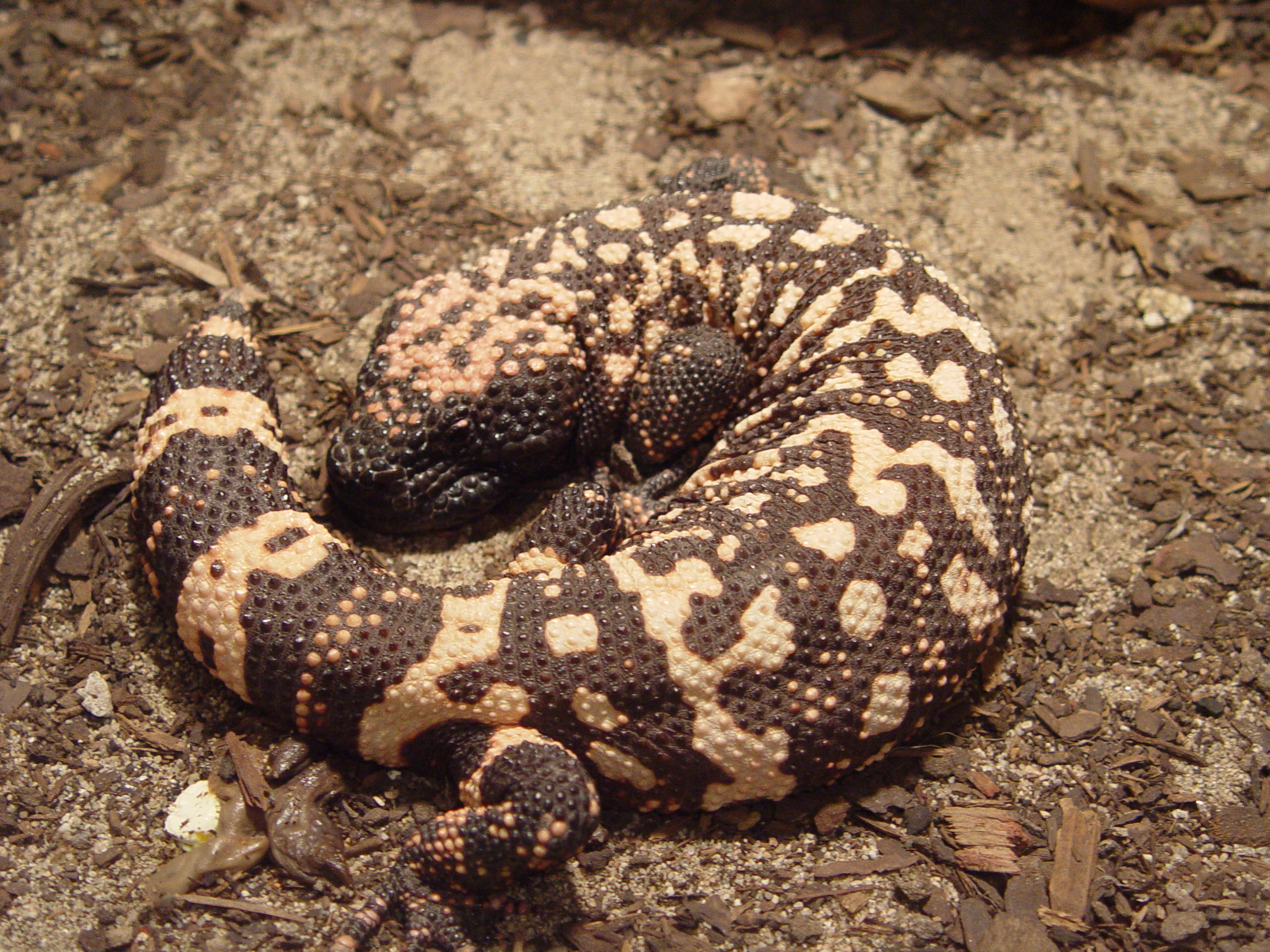
- In the American International Rattlesnake Museum, New Mexico

Conservation status
- Near Threatened (IUCN 3.1)
- CITES Appendix II

Scientific classification
- Kingdom: Animalia
- Phylum: Chordata
- Class: Reptilia
- Order: Squamata
- Suborder: Anguimorpha
- Family: Helodermatidae
- Genus: Heloderma
- Species: H. suspectum

Binomial name
- Heloderma suspectum Cope, 1869

= Gila monster =

Largest species of lizard in the United States

A Gila monster

The Gila monster (/ˈhiːlə/ HEE-lə; Heloderma suspectum) is a species of venomous lizard native to the Southwestern United States and the northwestern Mexican state of Sonora. It is a heavy, slow-moving reptile, up to 22 in (56 cm) long, and it is the only venomous lizard native to the United States. The Gila monster is sluggish in nature, so it is not generally dangerous and very rarely poses a real threat to humans, though the bite is painful. Nonetheless, it has a fearsome reputation and is sometimes killed despite the species being protected by state law in Arizona.

The lower teeth have venom grooves to transmit the venom to the prey. The venom contains multiple peptides; one of these, exendin-4, formed the basis for the development of the GLP-1 receptor agonists, used to treat type 2 diabetes and obesity.

== Etymology ==
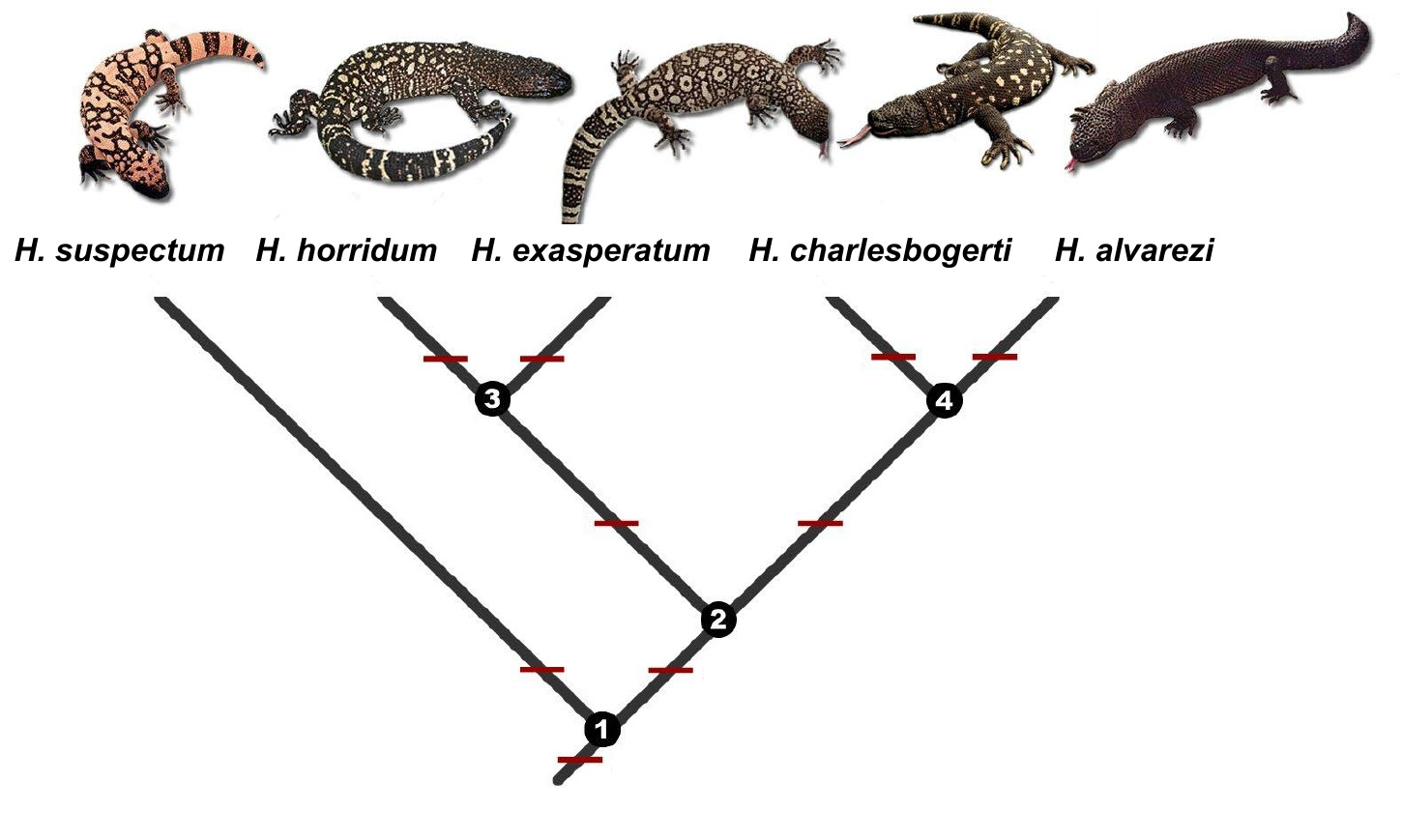
Evolutionary splitting of the genus Heloderma into species (Reiserer et al) Explanation of the numbers: 1 / Late Eocene (about 35 million years); 2 / Late Miocene (about 10 million years); 3 / Pliocene (about 4.4 million years); 4 / Pliocene (about 3.0 million years)

The name "Gila" refers to the Gila River Basin in the U.S. states of Arizona and New Mexico, where the Gila monster was once plentiful. Heloderma means "studded skin", from the Ancient Greek words helos (ἧλος), "the head of a nail or stud", and derma (δέρμα), "skin". The species epithet suspectum comes from the describer, paleontologist Edward Drinker Cope. At first, this new specimen of Heloderma was misidentified and considered to be a northern variation of the beaded lizard already known to live in Mexico. He suspected that the lizard might be venomous due to the grooves in the teeth.

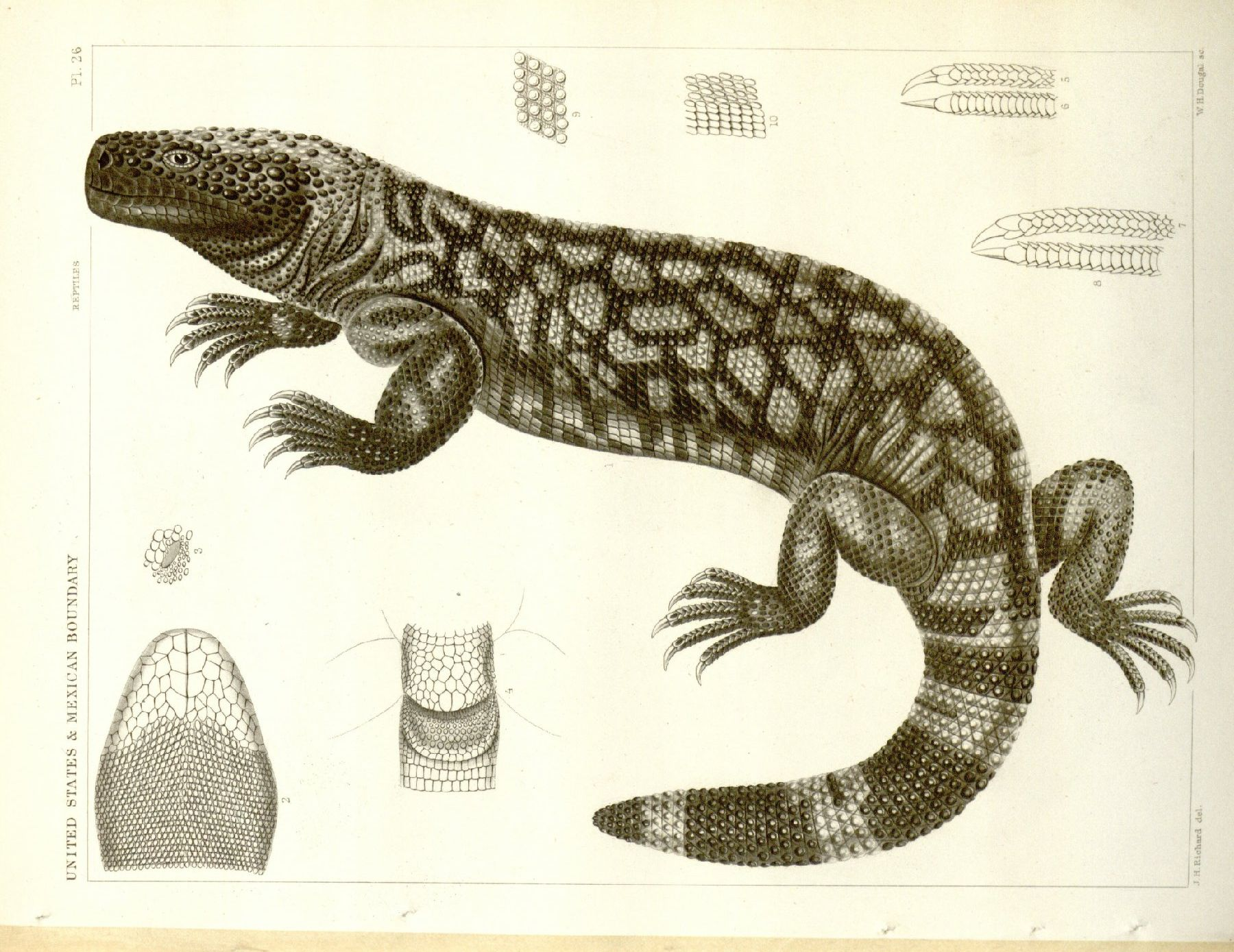
The first drawing of a Gila monster by Baird, S. F. (1857)

== Description ==
The Gila monster is the largest extant lizard species native to North America north of the Mexican border. Its snout-to-vent length ranges from 26 to 36 cm (10 to 14 in). The tail is about 20% of the body size, and the largest specimens may reach 51 to 56 cm (20 to 22 in) in total length. Body mass is typically in the range of 550 to 800 g (1.21 to 1.76 lb). They appear strong in their body structure with a stout snout, massive head, and "little"-appearing eyes, which can be protected by a nictitating membrane.

The Gila monster has four close living relatives, all of which are beaded lizards. There are three species in Mexico: Heloderma exasperatum, H. horridum and H. alvarezi, as well as another species in Guatemala: H. charlesbogerti.

The evolutionary history of the Helodermatidae may be traced back to the Cretaceous period (145 to 166 million years ago), when Gobiderma pulchrum and Estesia mongolensis were present. The genus Heloderma has existed since the Miocene, when H. texana lived. Fragments of osteoderms from the Gila monster have been found in Late Pleistocene (10,000 to 8,000 years ago) deposits near Las Vegas, Nevada. Because the helodermatids have remained relatively unchanged morphologically, they are occasionally regarded as living fossils. Although the Gila monster appears closely related to the monitor lizards (varanids) of Africa, Asia, and Australia, their wide geographical separation and distinct features indicate that Heloderma is better placed in a separate family.

== Skin ==
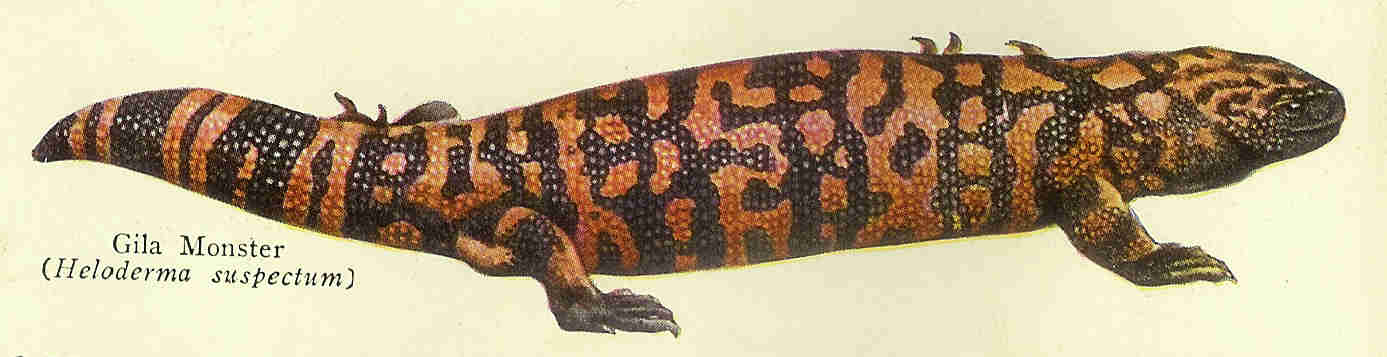
A plate from the Century Cyclopedia that depicts the Gila monster

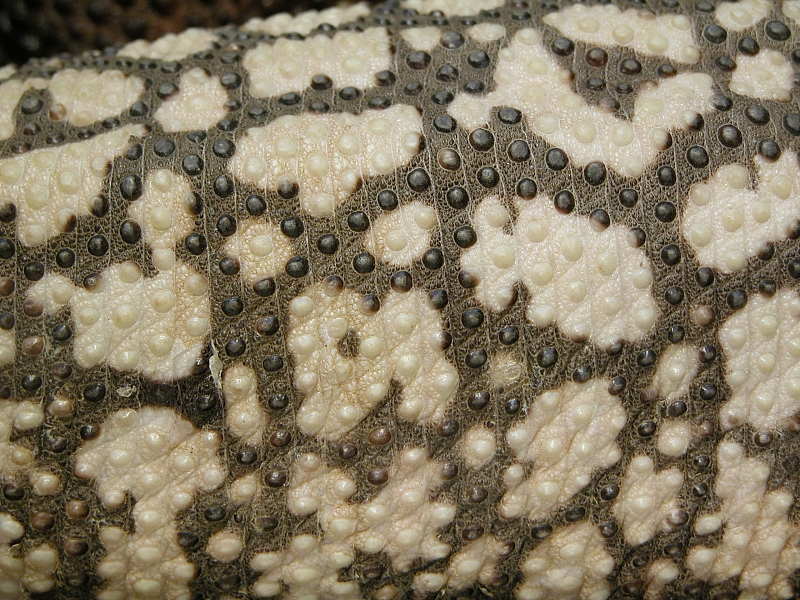
The dorsal skin of a Gila monster

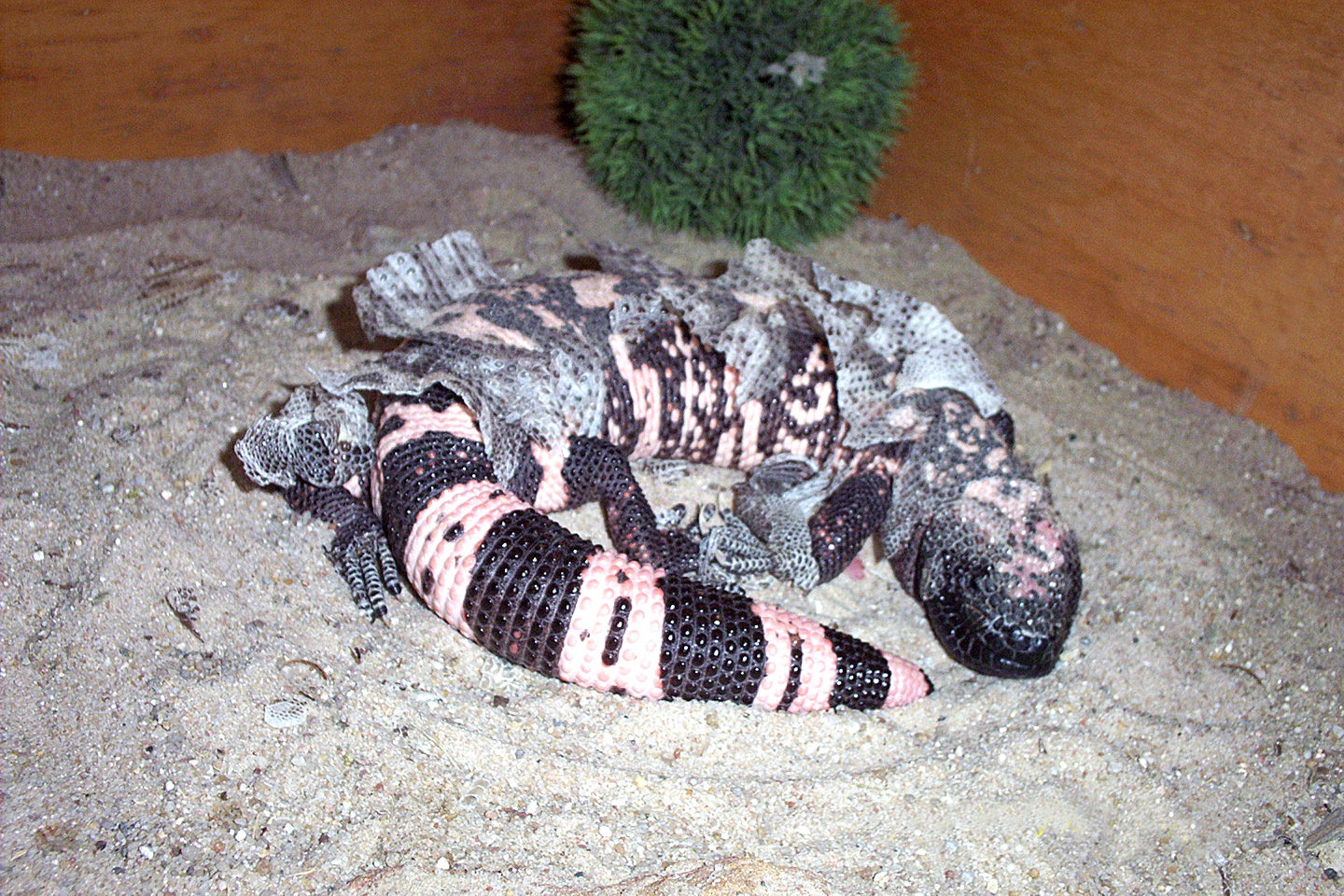
The total molt of a female Gila monster about 2 weeks before egg-laying

The scales of the head, back, and tail contain osteoderms, small round bones, like those of beaded lizards. The scales of the belly are free from osteoderms. Female Gila monsters go through a total shed lasting about 2 weeks before depositing their eggs. The dorsal part is often shed in one large piece. Adult males normally shed in smaller segments in August. The young seem to be in constant shed. Adults have more or less yellow to pink colors on a black surface. Hatchlings have a uniform, simple, and less colorful pattern. This drastically changes within the first 6 months of their lives. Hatchlings from the northern area of the species' distribution have a tendency to retain most of their juvenile pattern. Gila monsters in areas with darker rocks and substrate might have darker colorations.

The heads of males are very often larger and more triangular-shaped than in females. The length of the tail of the two sexes is statistically very similar, so it does not help in differentiation of the sexes. Sexing requires experience. The sizes of osteodermes on the heads and the different cloacal scales give hints to the sexes.

== Distribution and habitat ==
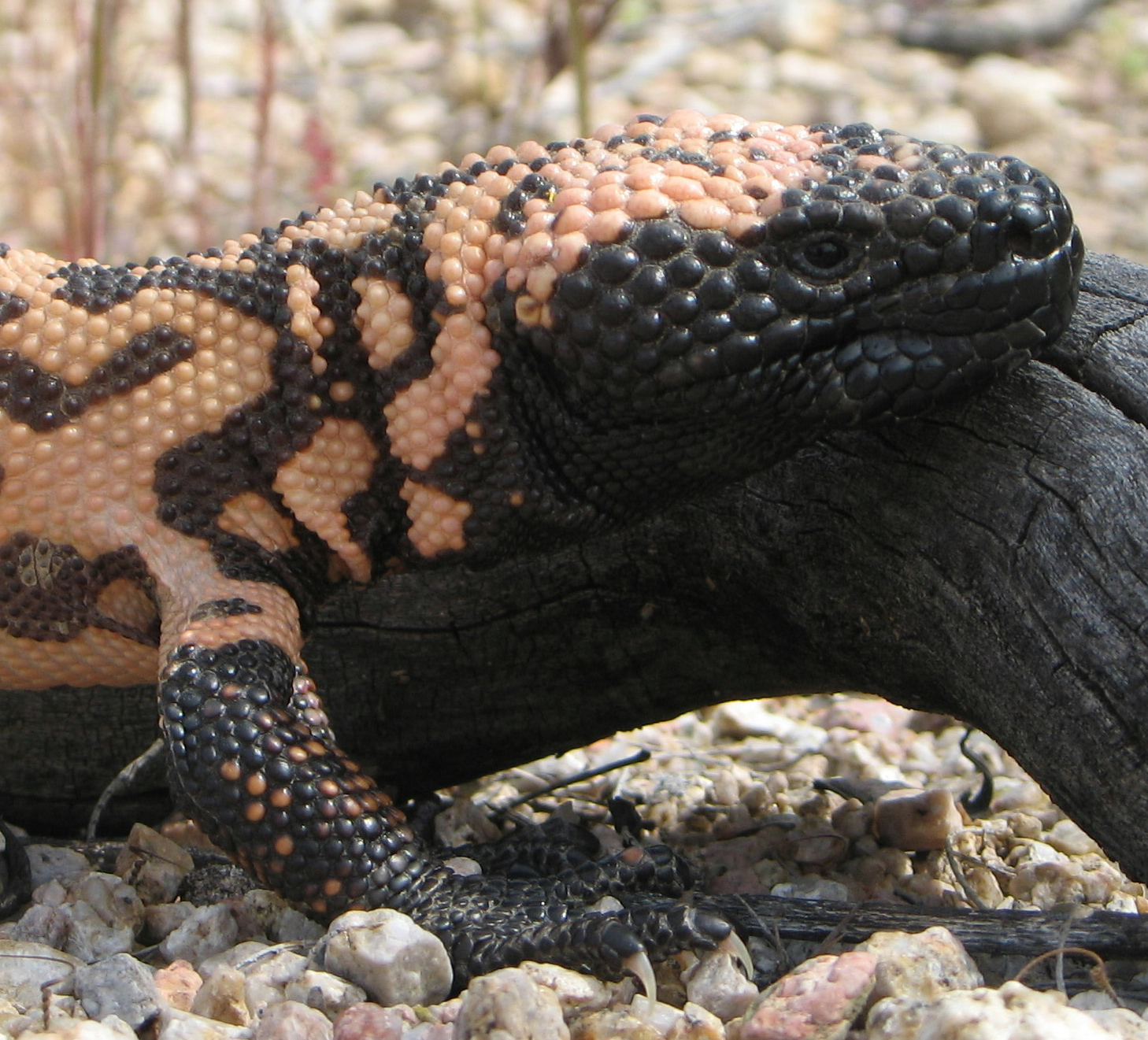
The head of a Gila monster with bead-like scales and strong forelegs and claws suitable for digging

The Gila monster is found in the Southwestern United States and Mexico, across a range including Sonora, Arizona, and parts of California, Nevada, Utah, and New Mexico. No records have been given from Baja California. They inhabit scrubland, succulent desert, and oak woodland, seeking shelter in burrows, thickets, and under rocks in locations with a favorable microclimate and adequate humidity. Gila monsters rely heavily on the use of shelters and spend much of their time dwelling there. Often times these shelters are in rocky areas in Navajo Sandstone and basaltic lava flows. Gila monsters depend on water resources and can be observed in puddles of water after a summer rain. They avoid living in open areas, such as flats and open grasslands.

== Ecology ==
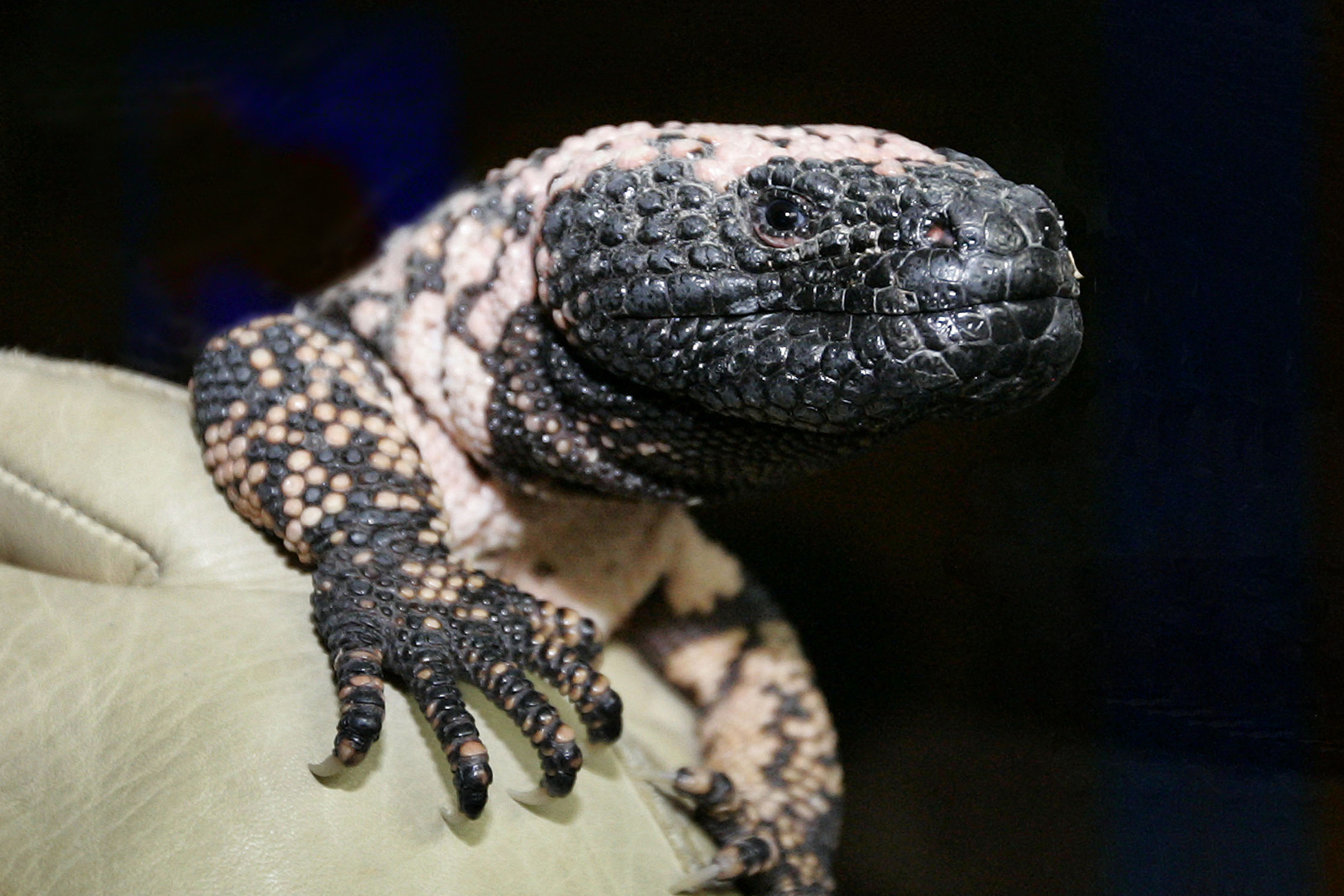
A Gila monster in captivity

Gila monsters spend 90% of their lifetime underground in burrows or rocky shelters. They are active in the morning during the dry season (spring and early summer). The lizards move to different shelters every 4–5 days up to the beginning of the summer season. By doing so, they optimize for a suitable microhabitat. Later in the summer, they may be active on warm nights or after a thunderstorm. They maintain a surface body temperature of about 30 °C (86 °F). Close to 37 °C (99 °F), they are able to decrease their body temperature by up to 2 °C (3.6 °F) by an activated, limited evaporation via the cloaca. One study investigating a population of Gila monsters in southwestern Utah noted that the lizard's activity peaked from late April to mid June. The average distance traveled during their bouts of activity was 210 metres (690 ft), but on occasion some lizards would travel distances greater than 1 kilometre (0.62 mi). During the Gila monster's active season of approximately 90 days, only ten days were spent active. Gila monsters are slow sprinters, but they have relatively high endurance and maximal aerobic capacity (VO_{2} max) compared to other lizards. They are preyed upon by coyotes, badgers, and raptors. Eggs and young are more vulnerable to predation than adults.

Among adaptations to a dry environment is a slow metabolism, allowing them to use less than half the amount of energy expected for lizards of their size. Gila monsters, and possibly also the Mexican beaded lizard, store water in their urinary bladder and reabsorb it across the bladder epithelium. Their tail is used for energy storage in the form of fat.

== Diet ==
The Gila monster's diet consists of a wide range of small animals – mammals (such as young rabbits, hares, mice, ground squirrels, and other rodents), small birds, snakes, lizards, frogs, insects, other invertebrates, carrion, and the eggs of birds, lizards, snakes, and tortoises. Three to four extensive meals in spring are claimed to give Gila monsters enough energy for a whole season. They can store fat in their tails and therefore do not need to eat often. Nevertheless, they feed whenever they come across suitable prey. Young Gila monsters can swallow up to half of their body weight in a single meal. Adults may eat up to one third of their body weight in one meal.

The Gila monster uses its highly acute sense of smell to locate prey. The strong, two-ended tipped tongue, which is pigmented in black-blue colors, picks up scent, enabling the animal to hunt by day or night.

Prey may be crushed to death if large, or eaten alive, most of the time head first, and helped down by muscular contractions and neck flexing. After food has been swallowed, the Gila monster may immediately resume tongue flicking and search behavior in order to identify further prey such as eggs or young in nests. Gila monsters are able to climb trees, cacti, and even fairly straight, rough-surfaced walls.

== Venom ==
"I have never been called to attend a case of Gila monster bite, and I don't want to be. I think a man who is fool enough to get bitten by a Gila monster ought to die. The creature is so sluggish and slow of movement that the victim of its bite is compelled to help largely in order to get bitten."

— Dr. Ward, Arizona Graphic, September 23, 1899

=== Pioneer beliefs ===
In the Old West, the pioneers believed a number of myths about the Gila monster, including that the lizard had foul or toxic breath and that its bite was fatal.

On May 8, 1890, southeast of Tucson, Arizona Territory, Empire Ranch owner Walter Vail captured and thought he had killed a Gila monster. He tied it to his saddle and it bit the middle finger of his right hand and would not let go. A ranch hand pried open the lizard's mouth with a pocket knife, cut open his finger to stimulate bleeding, and then tied saddle strings around his finger and wrist. They summoned Dr. John C. Handy of Tucson, who took Vail back to Tucson for treatment, but Vail experienced swollen and bleeding glands in his throat for sometime afterward.

Dr. Handy's friend, Dr. George Goodfellow of Tombstone, was among the first to research the actual effects of Gila monster venom. Scientific American reported in 1890, "The breath is very fetid, and its odor can be detected at some little distance from the lizard. It is supposed that this is one way in which the monster catches the insects and small animals which form a part of its food supply – the foul gas overcoming them." Goodfellow offered to pay local residents $5.00 for Gila monster specimens (equivalent to $180 in 2025). He bought several and collected more on his own. In 1891, he purposely provoked one of his captive lizards into biting him on his finger. The bite made him ill and he spent the next five days in bed, but he completely recovered. When Scientific American ran another ill-founded report on the lizard's ability to kill people, he wrote in reply and described his own studies and personal experience. He wrote that he knew several people who had been bitten by Gila monsters but had not died from the bite.

=== Venom delivery ===
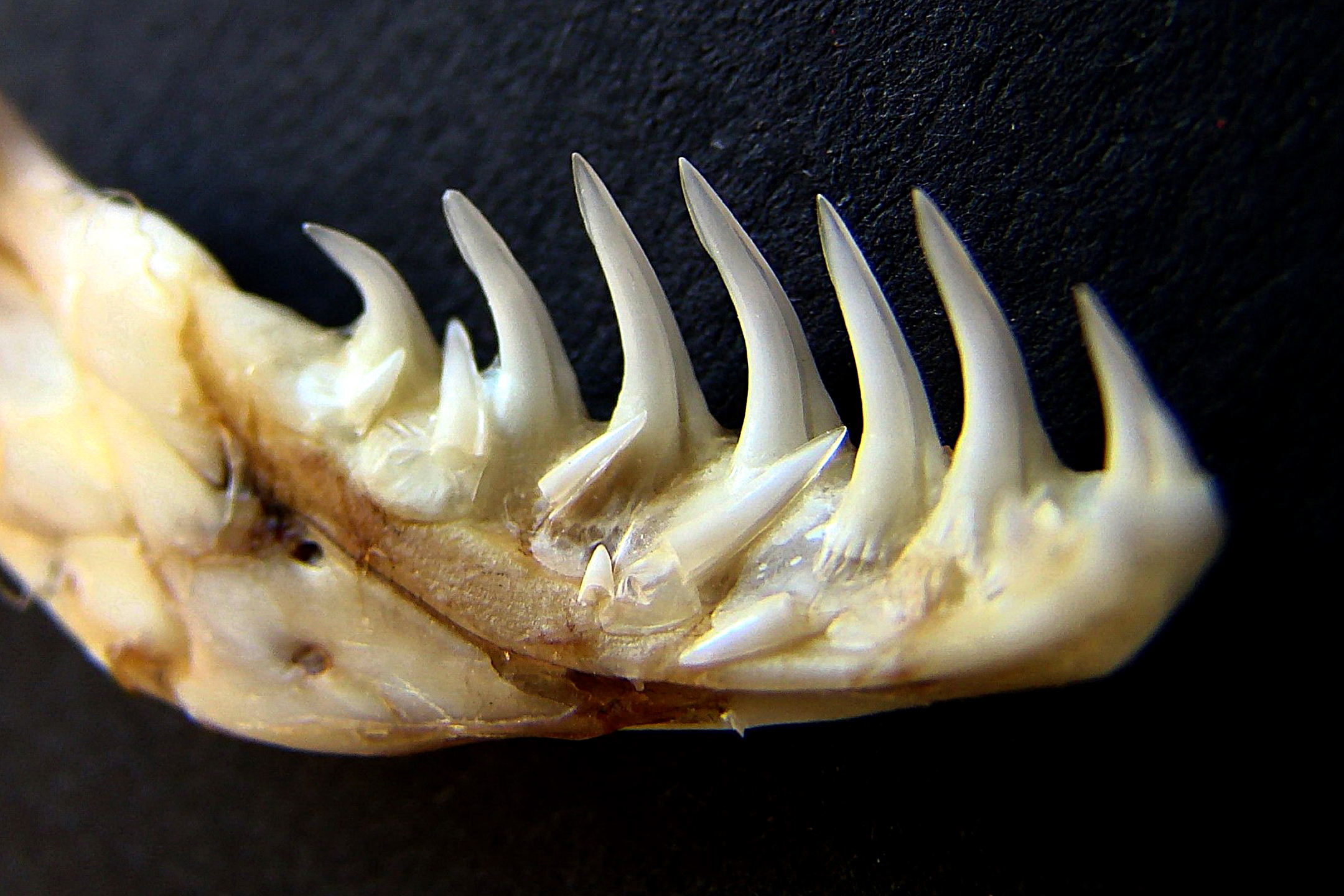
Venom grooves and position of the exchange teeth

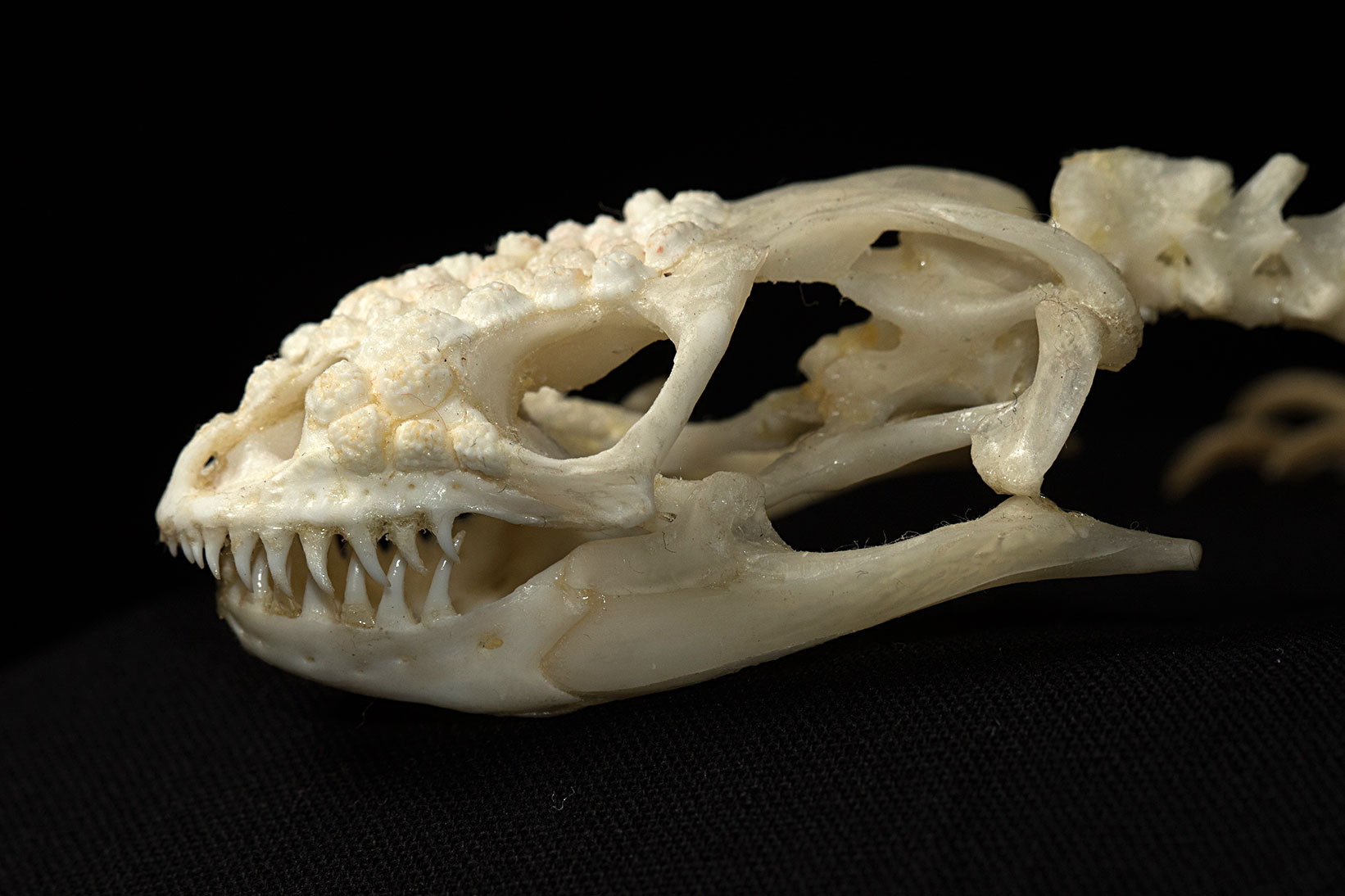
Gila monster skull showing dentition (osteoderms are fused with the forehead), photo by A. Laube

The Gila monster produces venom in modified salivary glands at the end of its lower jaws, unlike snakes, whose venom is produced in glands behind the eyes. The Gila monster lacks strong musculature in glands above the eyes; instead, in Heloderma, the venom is propelled from the gland via a tube to the base of the lower teeth and then by capillary forces into two grooves of the tooth and then chewed into the victim. The teeth are tightly anchored to the jaw (pleurodont implantation). Broken teeth and teeth undergoing regular replacement have their place taken by teeth behind them processing forward in the mouth. Gila monsters change/replace their teeth throughout their life. The Gila monster's bright colors might serve to warn predators that the creature is one to be avoided, owing to its capacity to inflict pain. Because the Gila monster's prey consists mainly of eggs, small animals, and otherwise "helpless" prey, the Gila monster's venom is thought to have evolved for defensive rather than for hunting use.

=== Toxicity ===
The venom of a Gila monster is normally not fatal to healthy adult humans. One fatality has been confirmed since 1930, on February 16, 2024, and the rare fatalities recorded before 1930 occurred in adults who were intoxicated by alcohol or had mismanaged the treatment of the bite. Bites are painful and require emergency intervention, as the venom may induce shock.

More than a dozen peptides and other substances have been isolated from the venom, including hyaluronidase, serotonin, phospholipase A_{2}, and several kallikrein-like glycoproteins responsible for the pain and edema caused by a bite, without producing a compartment syndrome. Four potentially lethal toxins have been isolated from the Gila monster's venom, which cause hemorrhage in internal organs and exophthalmos (bulging of the eyes), and helothermine, which causes lethargy, partial paralysis of the limbs, and hypothermia in rats. Some are similar in action of the vasoactive intestinal peptide (VIP), which relaxes smooth muscle and regulates water and electrolyte secretion between the small and large intestines. These bioactive peptides are able to bind to VIP receptors in many different human tissues. One of these, helodermin, has been shown to inhibit the growth of lung cancer cells in vitro. In February 2024, a Colorado man died after sustaining a 4 minute long bite from a pet Gila monster. Autopsy reports determined cause of death to come from the animal bite/venom.

=== Relationship to GLP-1 agonists ===
The constituents of H. suspectum venom that have received the most attention from researchers are the bioactive peptides, including helodermin, helospectin, exendin-3, and exendin-4. Exendin-4, which is specific for H. suspectum, has formed the basis of a class of medications for the treatment of type 2 diabetes and obesity/metabolic syndrome, known as the GLP-1 receptor agonists.

In 2005, the U.S. Food and Drug Administration approved the drug exenatide (marketed as Byetta) for the management of type 2 diabetes. It is a synthetic modification of the protein exendin-4, that was originally isolated from the Gila monster's venom. In a 3-year study with people with type 2 diabetes, exenatide showed healthy sustained glucose levels. The effectiveness is because the lizard protein is 53% identical to glucagon-like peptide-1 analog (GLP-1), a hormone released from the human digestive tract that helps to regulate insulin and glucagon. GLP-1 not only increases insulin secretion but increases β-cell proliferation and survival. Using a sophisticated injection formula with sustained release of the drug, the protein remains effective much longer than the human hormone. This helps diabetics keep their blood glucose levels under control for a week by a single injection. Exenatide also slows the emptying of the stomach and causes a decrease in appetite, contributing to weight loss.

== Life cycle ==
Gila monsters emerge from brumation in early March. They become sexually mature at 4–5 years old. Mating takes place in April and May. The male initiates courtship by flicking his tongue to search for the female's scent. If the female rejects his advances, she will bite him and chase him away. When successful, copulation has been observed in captivity to last from 15 minutes to two and a half hours. There is only a single record of attempted mating outside of a shelter. The female lays eggs at the end of May into June. A clutch may consist of up to eight (rarely more than six) eggs. Hatching occurs near the end of October and immediately proceeds into hibernation without surfacing. Hatchlings are some 6.5 inches (17 cm) long and weigh around 0.075 pounds (34 g).

In summer, Gila monsters gradually spend less time on the surface to avoid the hottest part of the season; occasionally, they may be active at night. Females that have laid eggs are exhausted and thin, fighting for survival, and have to spend extra effort to "reconstitute". The brumation of Gila monsters begins in October.

Little is known about the social behavior of the Gila monster, but it has been observed engaging in male to male combat, in which the dominant male lies on top of the subordinate one and pins it with its front and hind limbs. While fighting, both lizards arch their bodies, pushing against each other and twisting around in an effort to gain the dominant position. A "wrestling match" ends when the pressure exerts their forces, although bouts may be repeated. These bouts are typically observed in the mating season. Males with greater strength and endurance are thought to enjoy greater reproductive success.

== Conservation status ==
Gila monsters are listed as near threatened by the IUCN. They are listed as "Apparently Secure" by NatureServe.

In 1952, the Gila monster became the first venomous animal to be given legal protection.

=== Relocation ===
"Possibly the greatest threat to the continued existence of helodermatids is the man-made destruction of their habitat as the land is developed for construction or to create more cultivable land." Gila monsters found in these situations and relocated up to 1.2 km (0.75 mi) away, return to where they were found within 2 months and at great effort, with exposure to predators. Such "naïve" relocation is potentially dangerous for humans in the area. It has been suggested that education about the Gila monster might be a more appropriate strategy.

=== Captive breeding ===
In 1963, the San Diego Zoo became the first zoo to successfully breed Gila monsters in captivity. In the last two decades, experienced breeders have shared their knowledge and expertise to give advice to other herpetologists on overcoming the difficulties in Heloderma reproduction under human care.

== Relationship with humans ==
Though the Gila monster is venomous, it poses little threat to humans due to its sluggish nature. Nevertheless, it has a fearsome reputation and is often killed by humans. Myths that have formed about the Gila monster include that the animal's breath is toxic enough to kill humans, that it can spit venom like a spitting cobra, that it can leap several feet in the air to attack, and that it did not have an anus and therefore expelled waste from its mouth, the source of its venom and "fetid breath".

=== In popular culture ===
The Gila monster starred as a monster in the film The Giant Gila Monster (though the titular monster was actually portrayed by a Mexican beaded lizard). It played a minor role in the motion picture The Treasure of the Sierra Madre. In Brock Brower's 1971 novel The Late Great Creature, fictional horror movie star Simon Moro is presented as famous for playing the reptilian werewolf-like Gila Man. The 2011 animated film Rango featured a Gila monster as an Old West outlaw named Bad Bill, voiced by Ray Winstone.

The Gila monster has also seen usage as a mascot and state symbol. The official mascot of Eastern Arizona College located in Thatcher, Arizona, is Gila Hank, a gun-toting, cowboy hat-wearing Gila monster. In 2017, the Vegas Golden Knights selected a Gila monster named Chance as their official mascot. In 2019, the state of Utah made the Gila monster its official state reptile.

In 2023, Australian band King Gizzard and the Lizard Wizard released a single titled "Gila Monster" from their album PetroDragonic Apocalypse, with the album's artwork featuring a Gila monster on its cover art and heavily within the album's concept narrative.

== Gallery ==
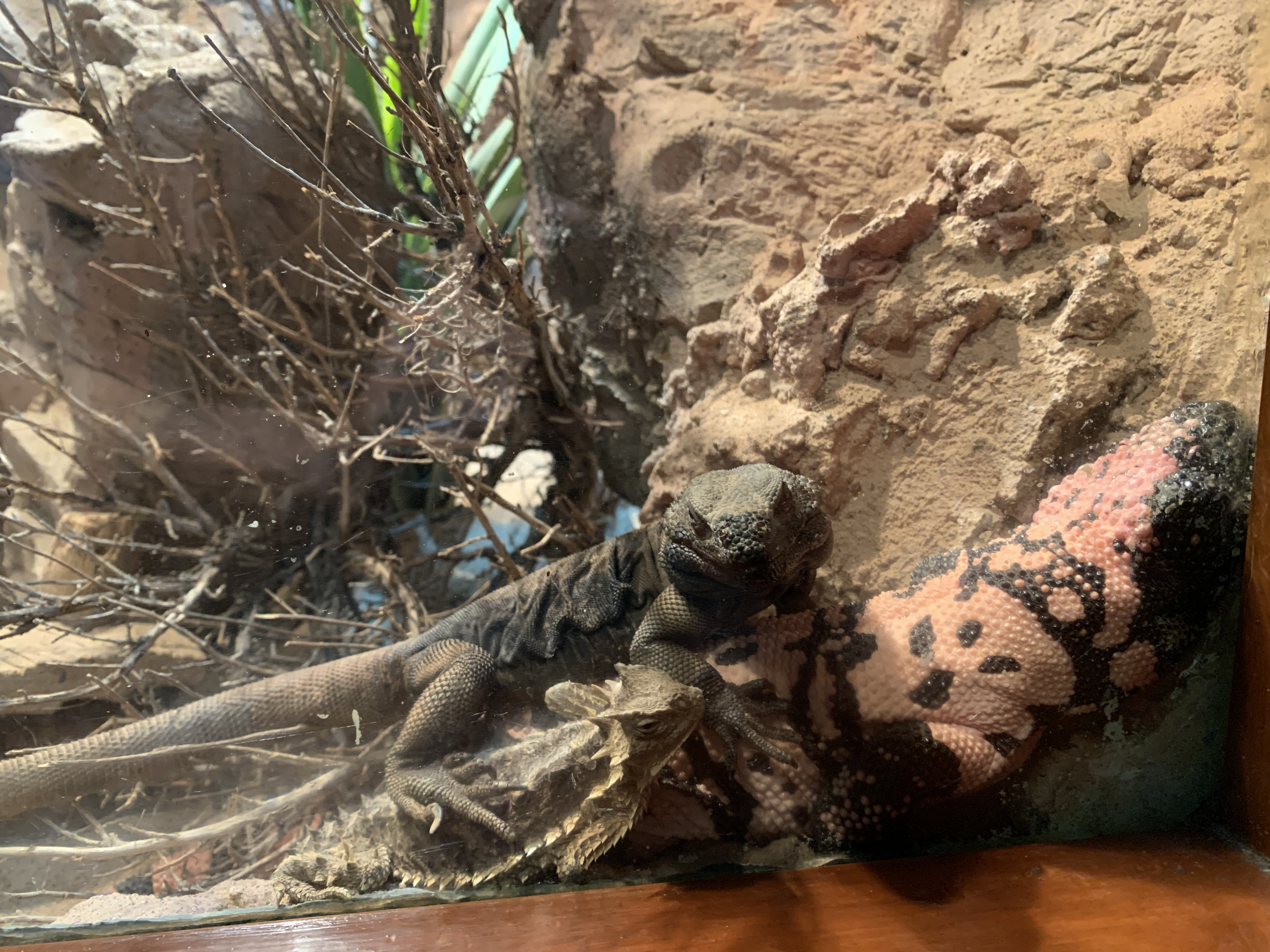
With a common chuckwalla and a giant horned lizard, Bronx Zoo

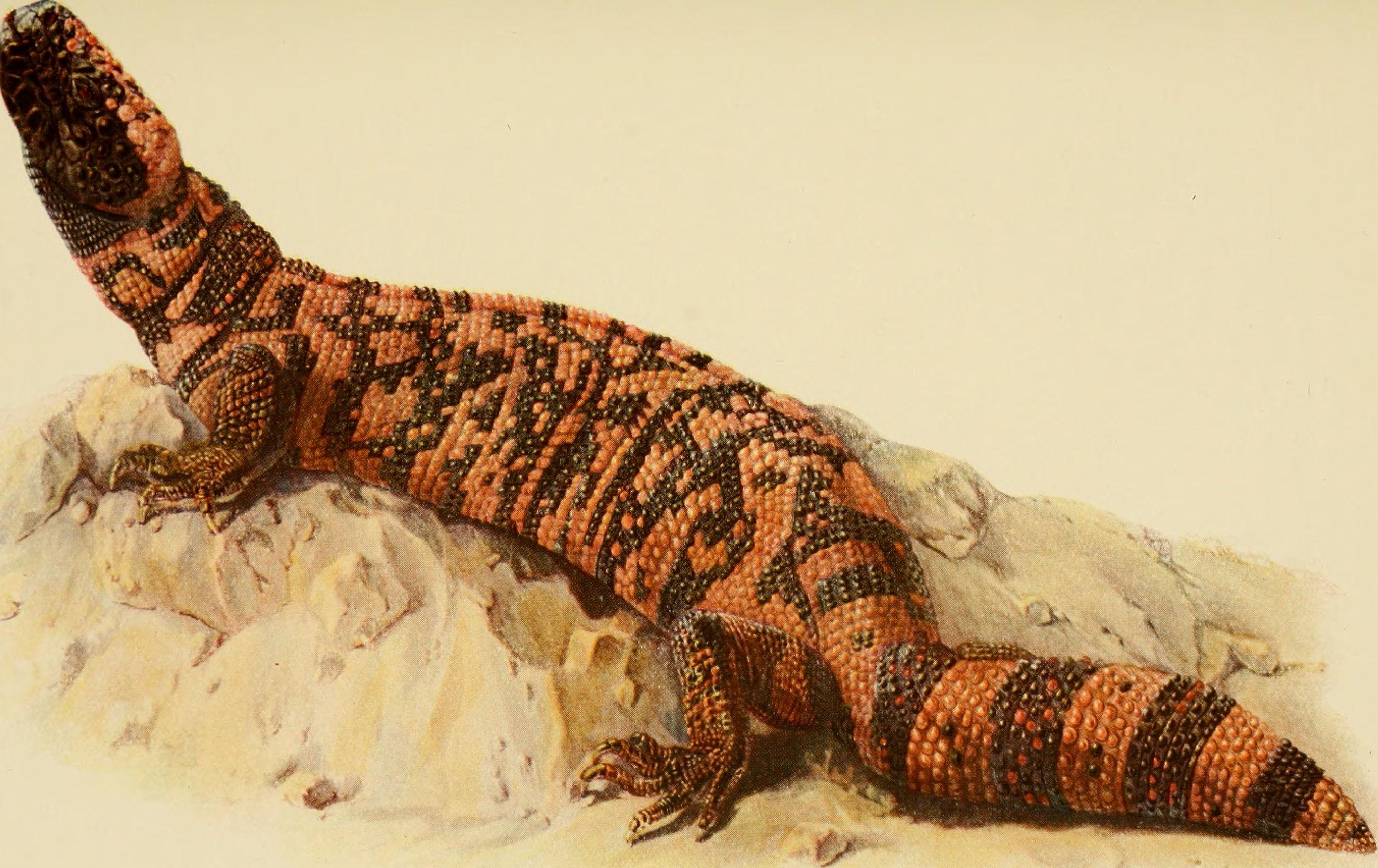
Illustration in Animaux venimeux et venins, 1922

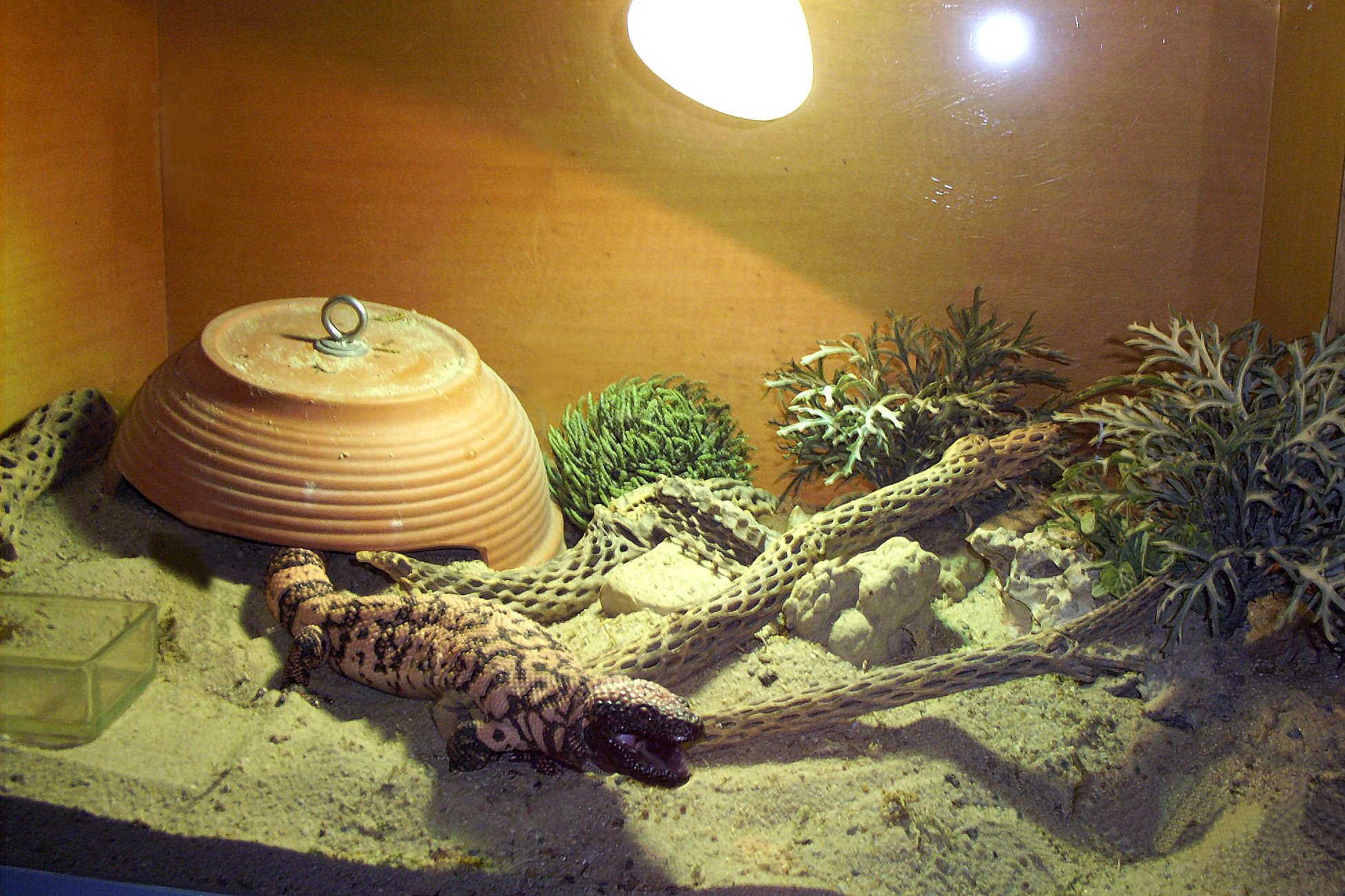
Tank setup with hiding bowl

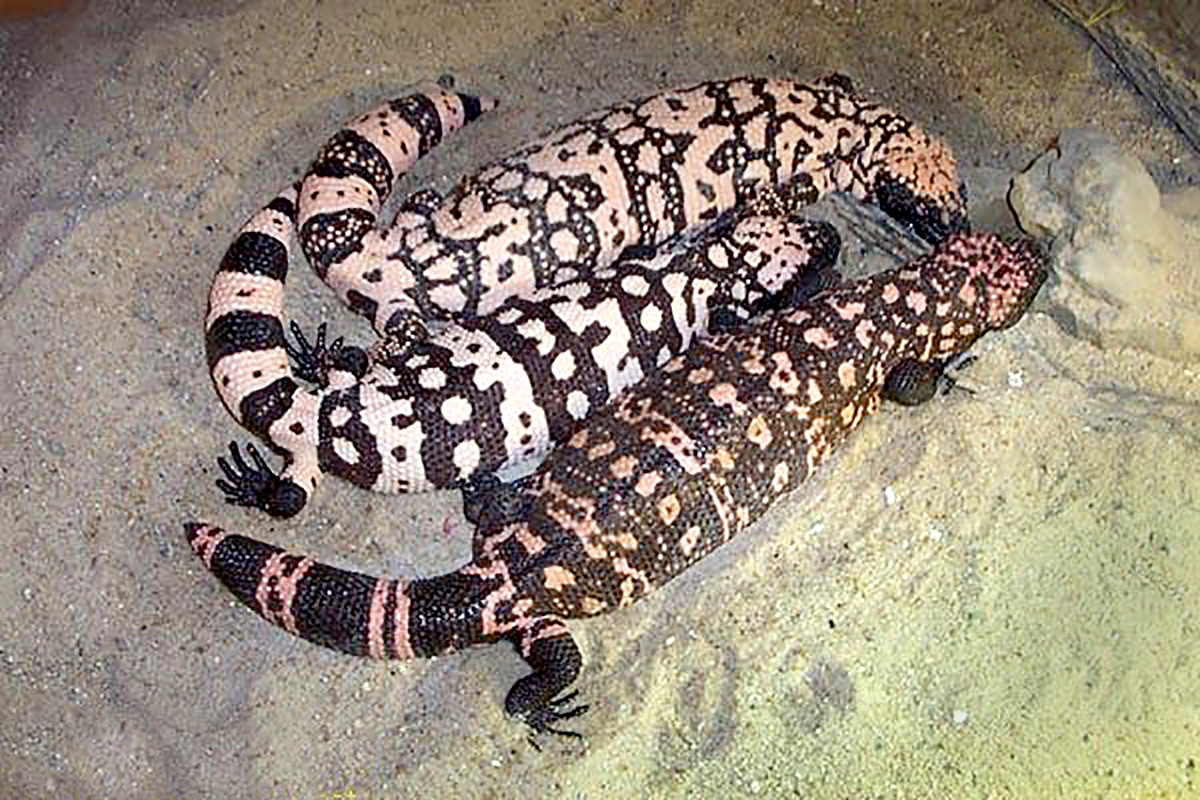
Pattern variations of female H. suspectum

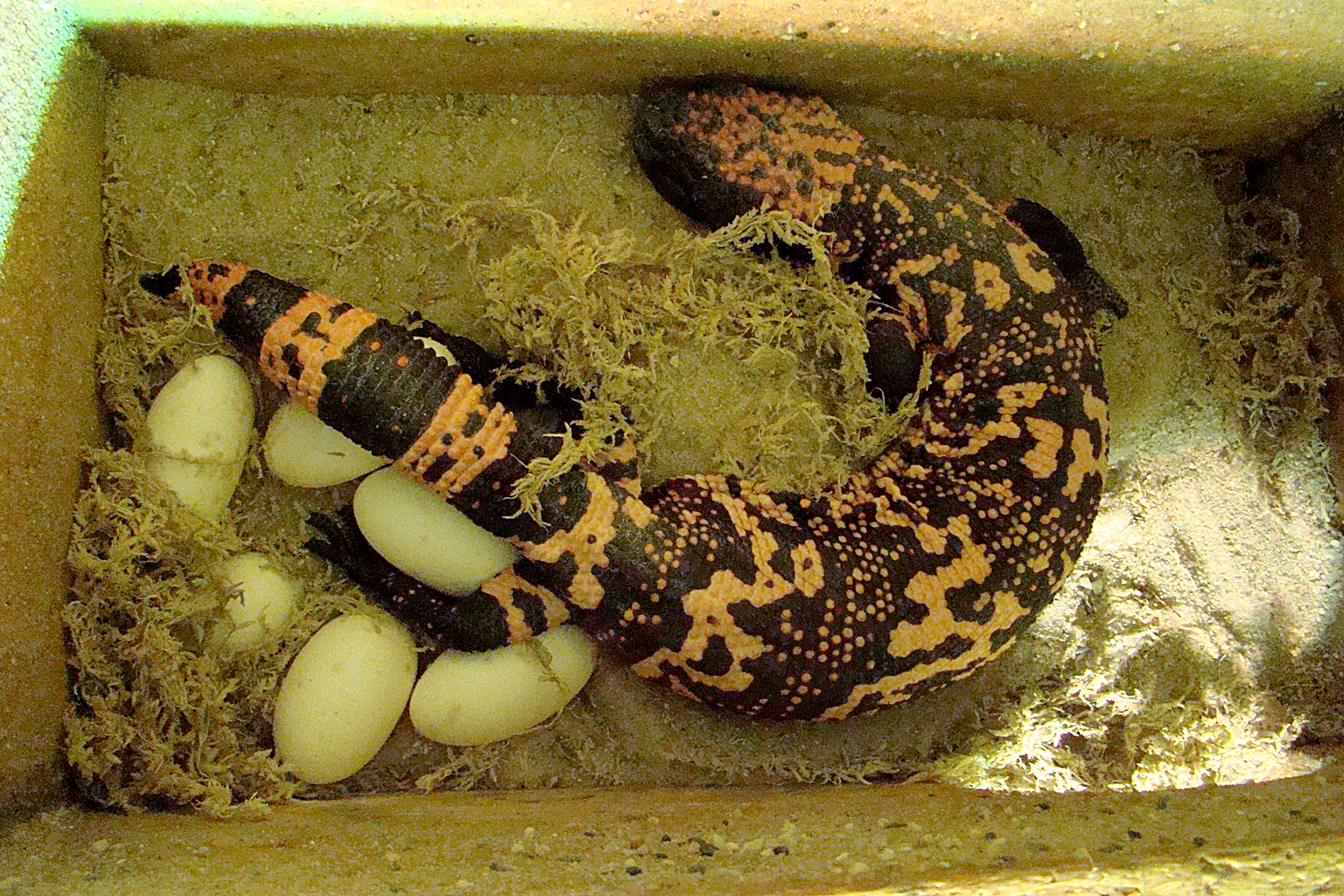
Egg deposit in captivity

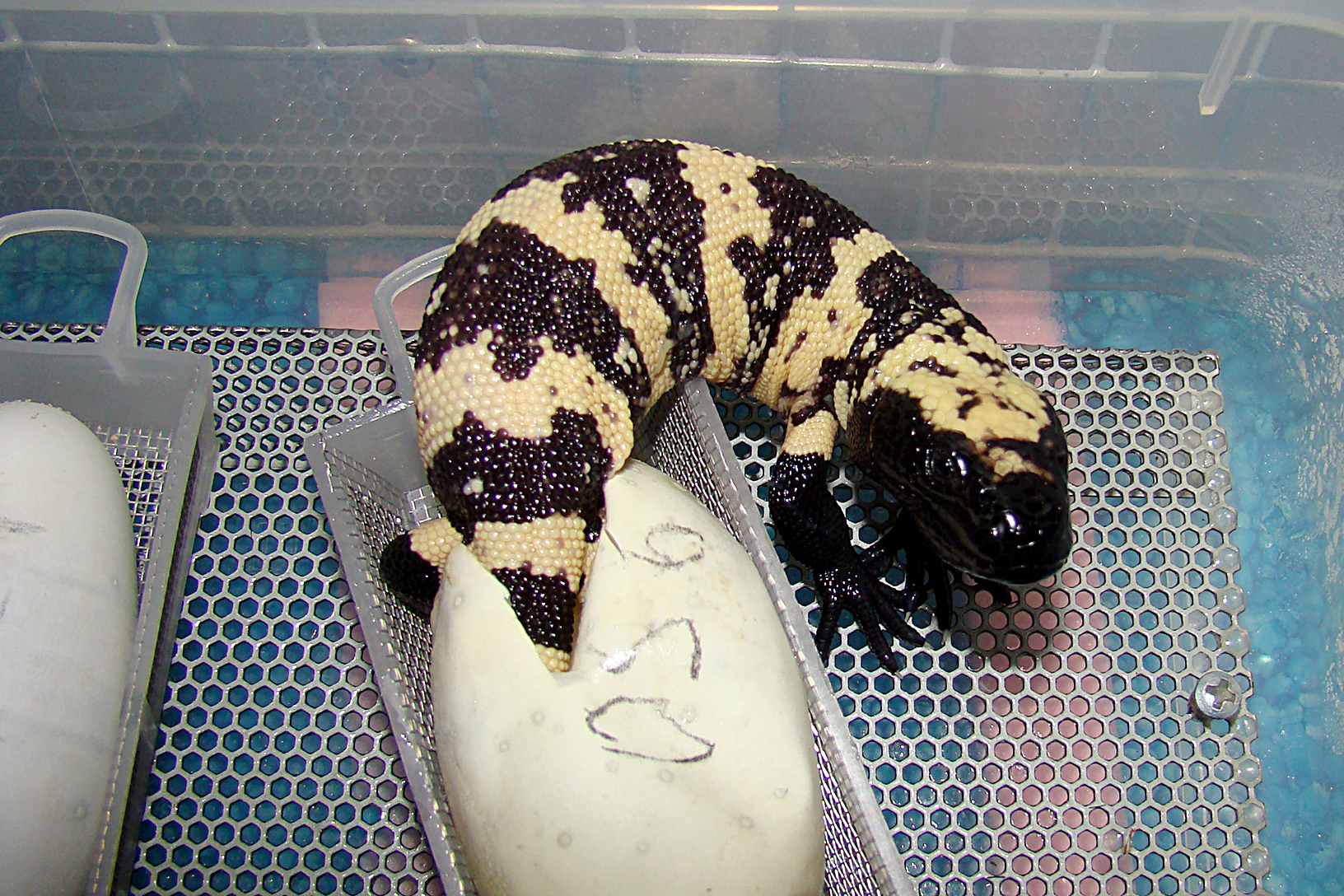
End of hatching process

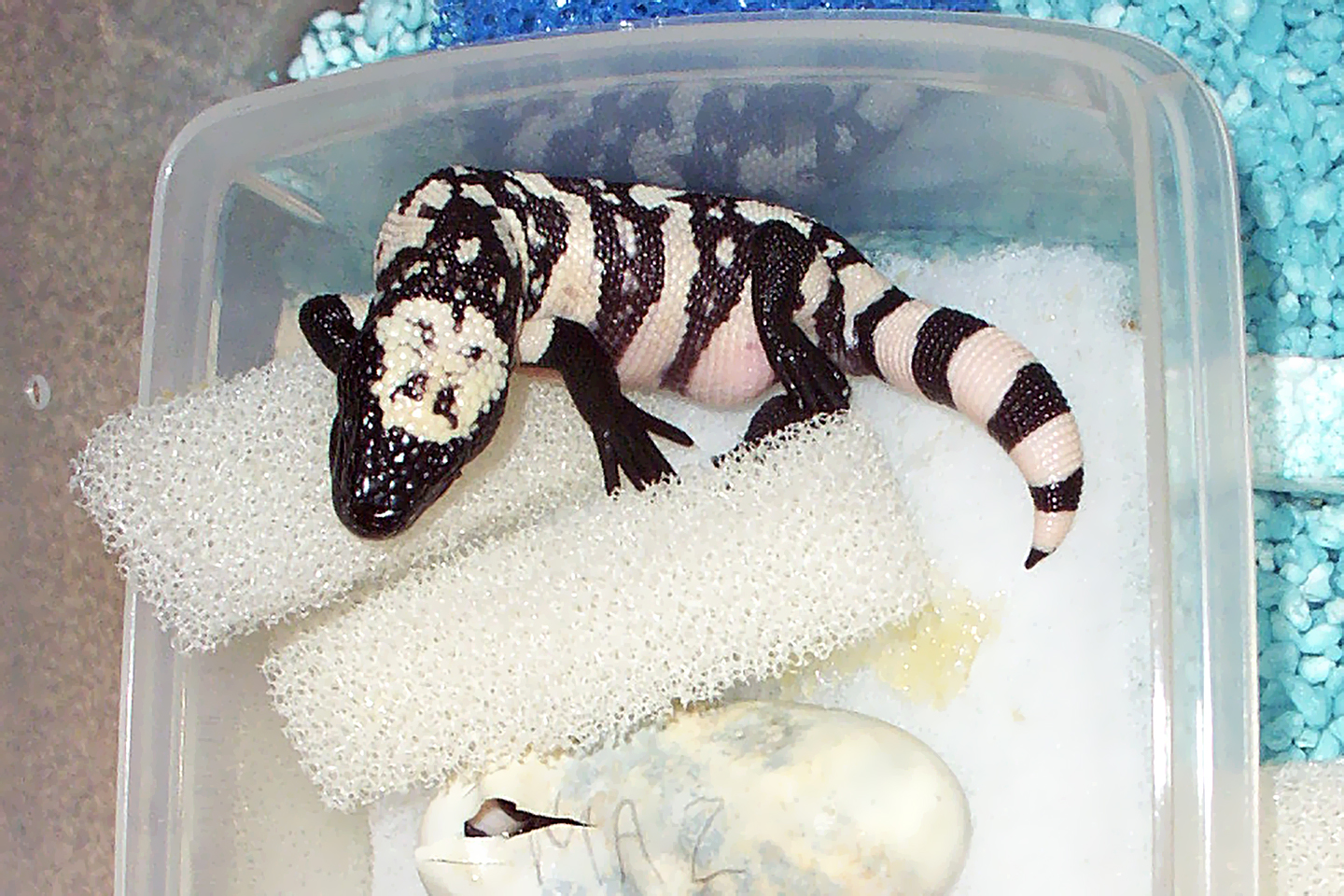
Absorbed yolk in the abdomen

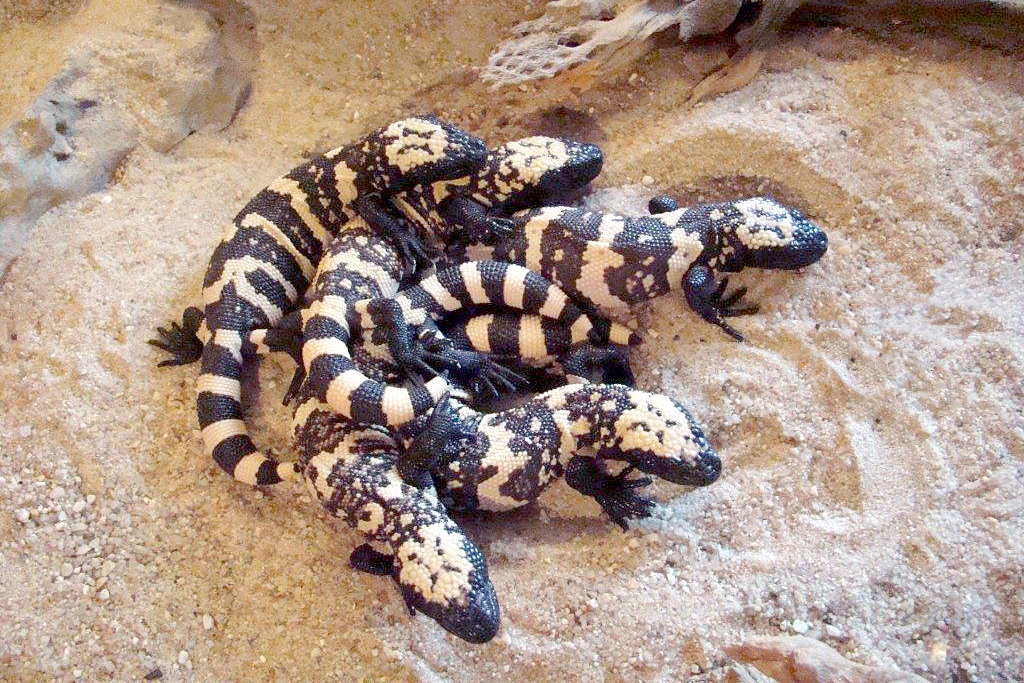
Group of Gila monster hatchlings

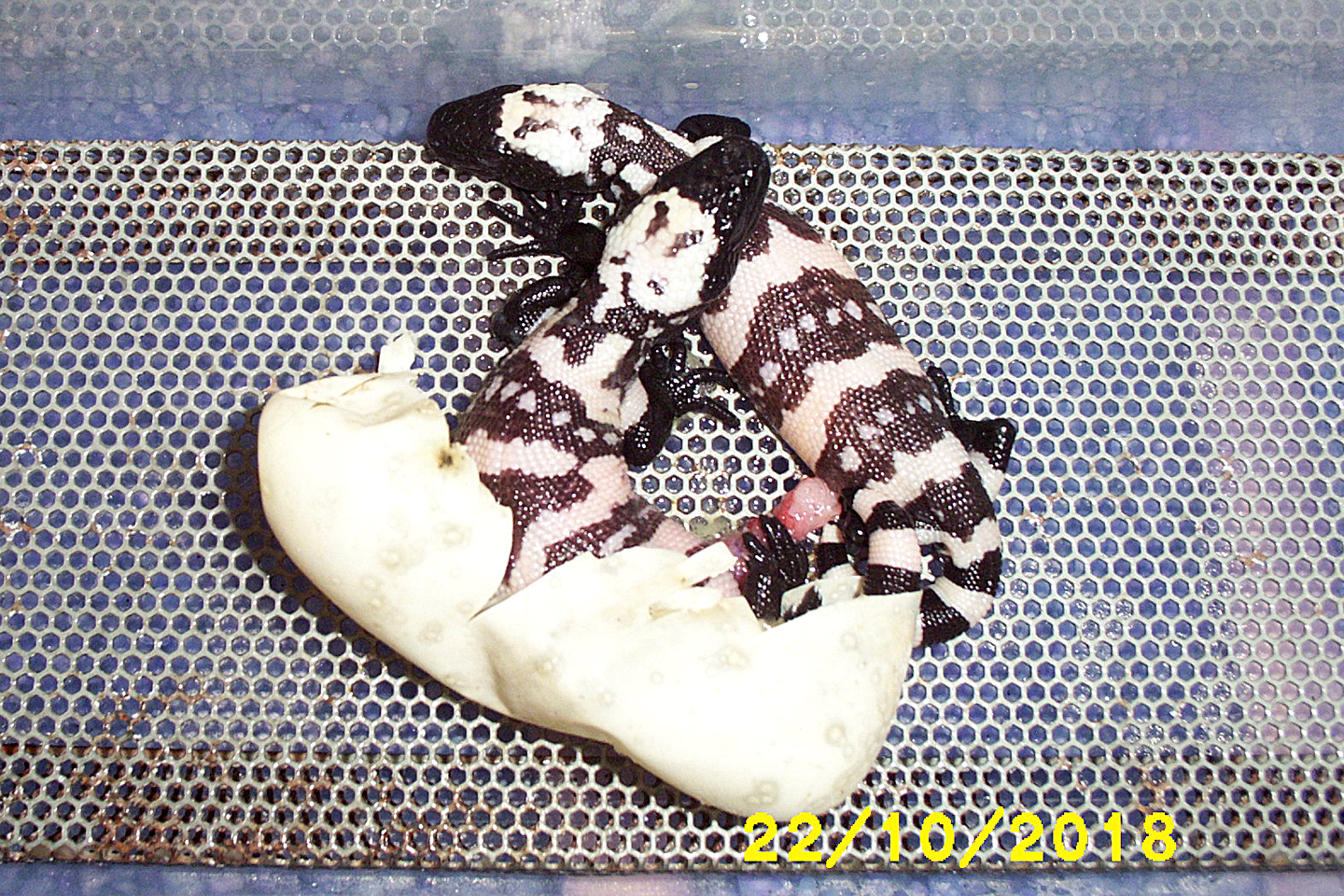
Gila monster twins hatching
