= Santa Rosa Plateau =

California geographical feature

Coordinates: 33.54336°N 117.26952°W

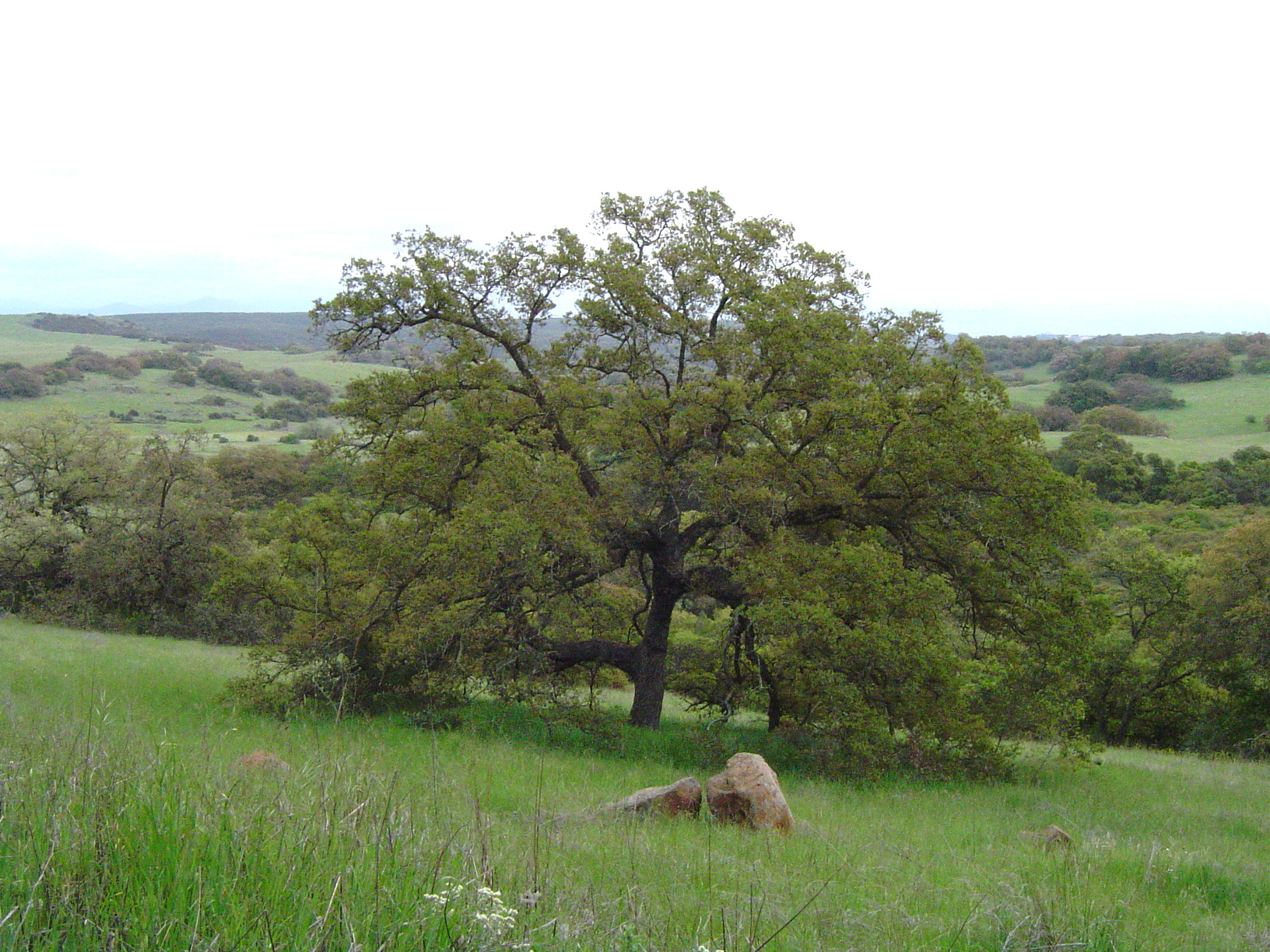
Engelmann Oak Woodlands

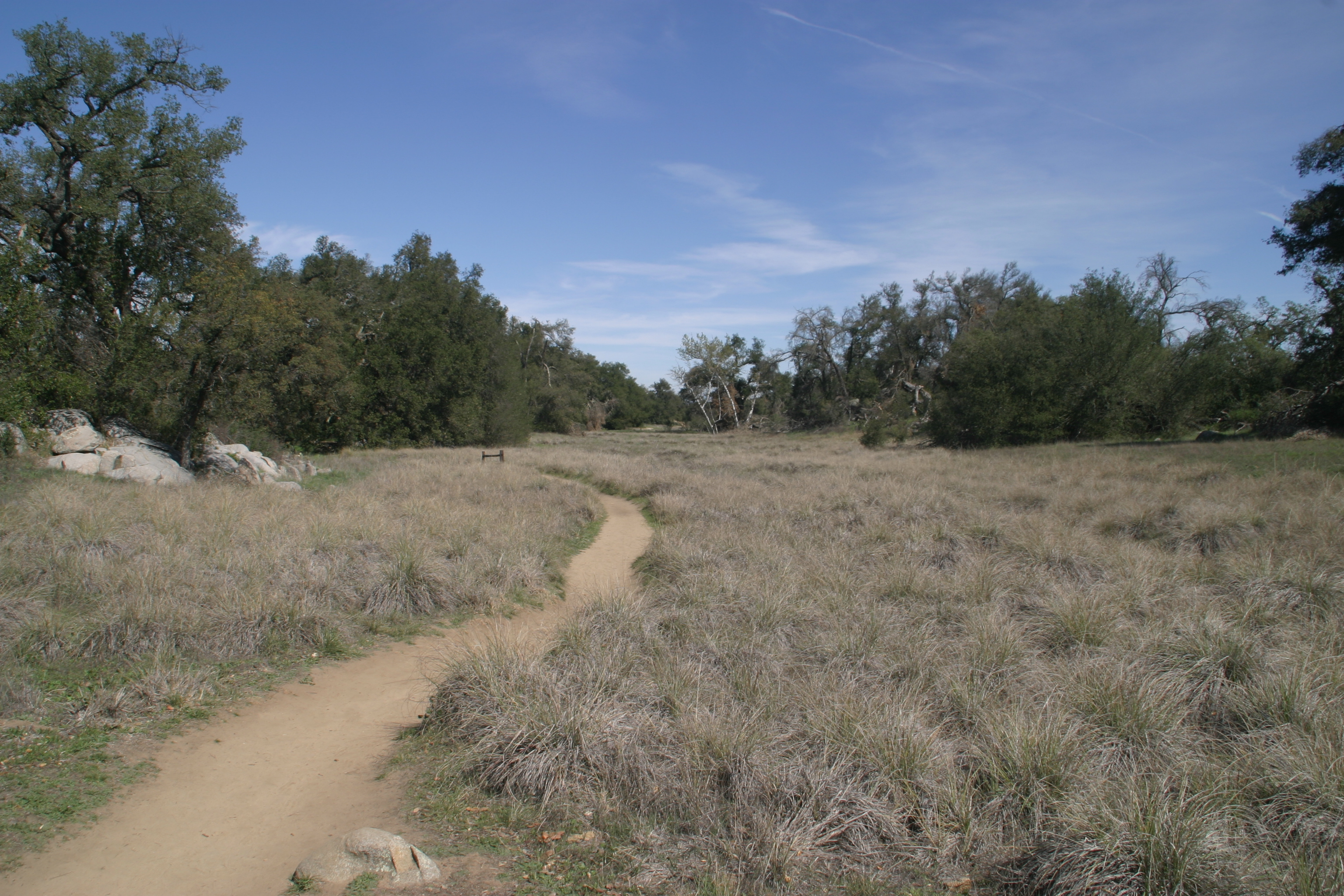
Trail through Oak Savanna

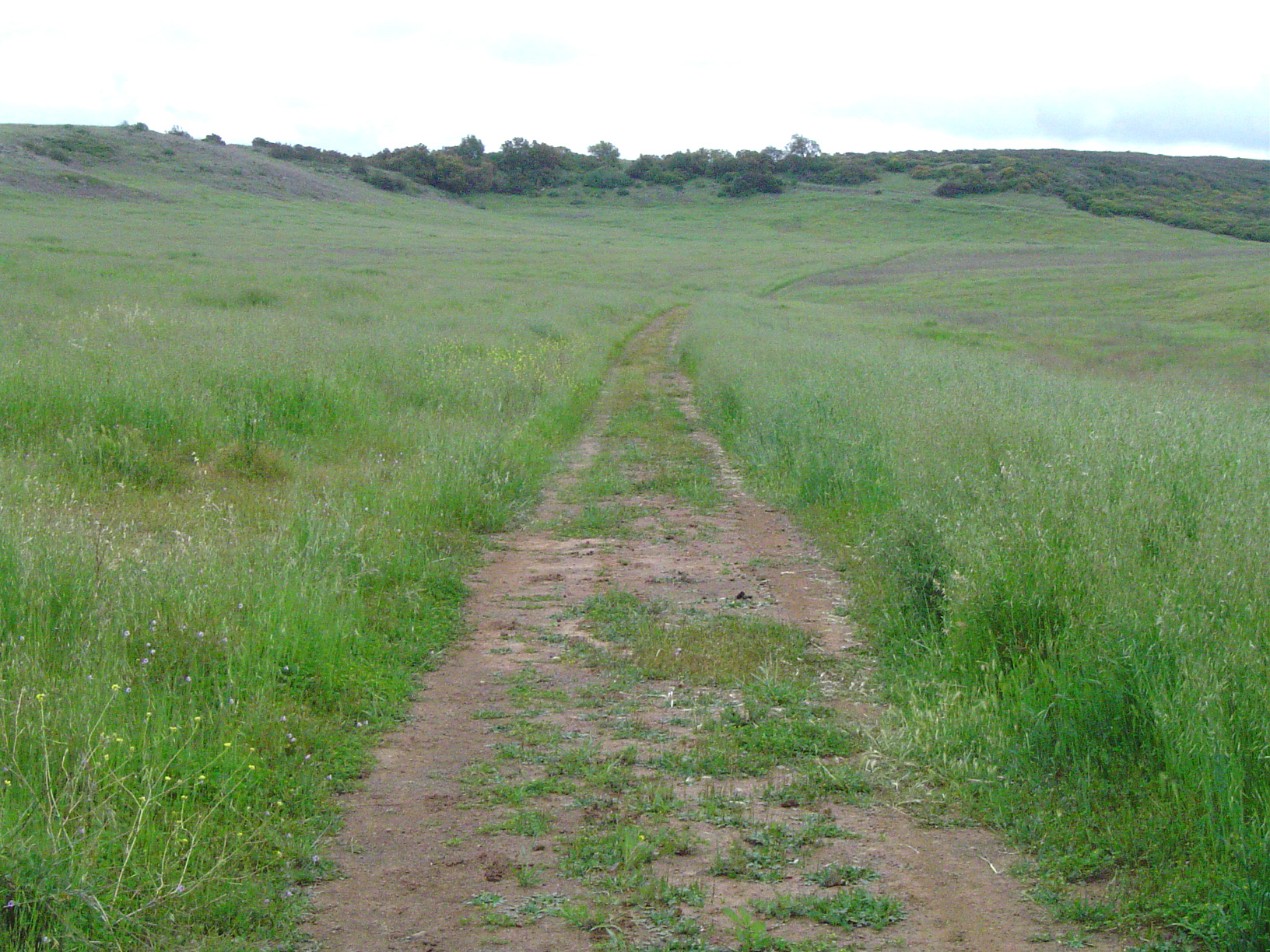
Purple Needlegrass Prairie

The Santa Rosa Plateau is an upland plateau and southeastern extension of the Santa Ana Mountains in Riverside County, California. It is bounded by the rapidly urbanizing Inland Empire cities of Murrieta and Temecula to the northeast and southeast, respectively.

The Santa Rosa Plateau Ecological Reserve preserves approximately 8,400 acres (34 km^{2}) of the plateau, and includes the Moreno and Machado Adobes, Riverside County’s oldest standing structures, and other buildings from the 19th century Mexican land grant Rancho Santa Rosa.

== Habitats ==
The Santa Rosa Plateau is home to several native plant communities and habitats, including purple needlegrass prairie (Nassella pulchra), California oak woodland (Engelmann Oaks—Quercus engelmannii), montane chaparral, coastal sage scrub, and vernal pools, which are increasingly rare in urbanized Southern California.

The Engelmann oak was once widespread throughout the western U.S. Now the farthest north they are found is Pasadena. The Reserve has the only protected, reproducing Engelmanns in the states.

A vernal pool is a shallow depression in the soil which fills up with water during spring rains. Fairy shrimp and other minute crustaceans hatch during this time and lay eggs. These eggs remain dormant during the dry months until the next rainy season allows them to hatch. (6)

== Santa Rosa Plateau Ecological Reserve ==
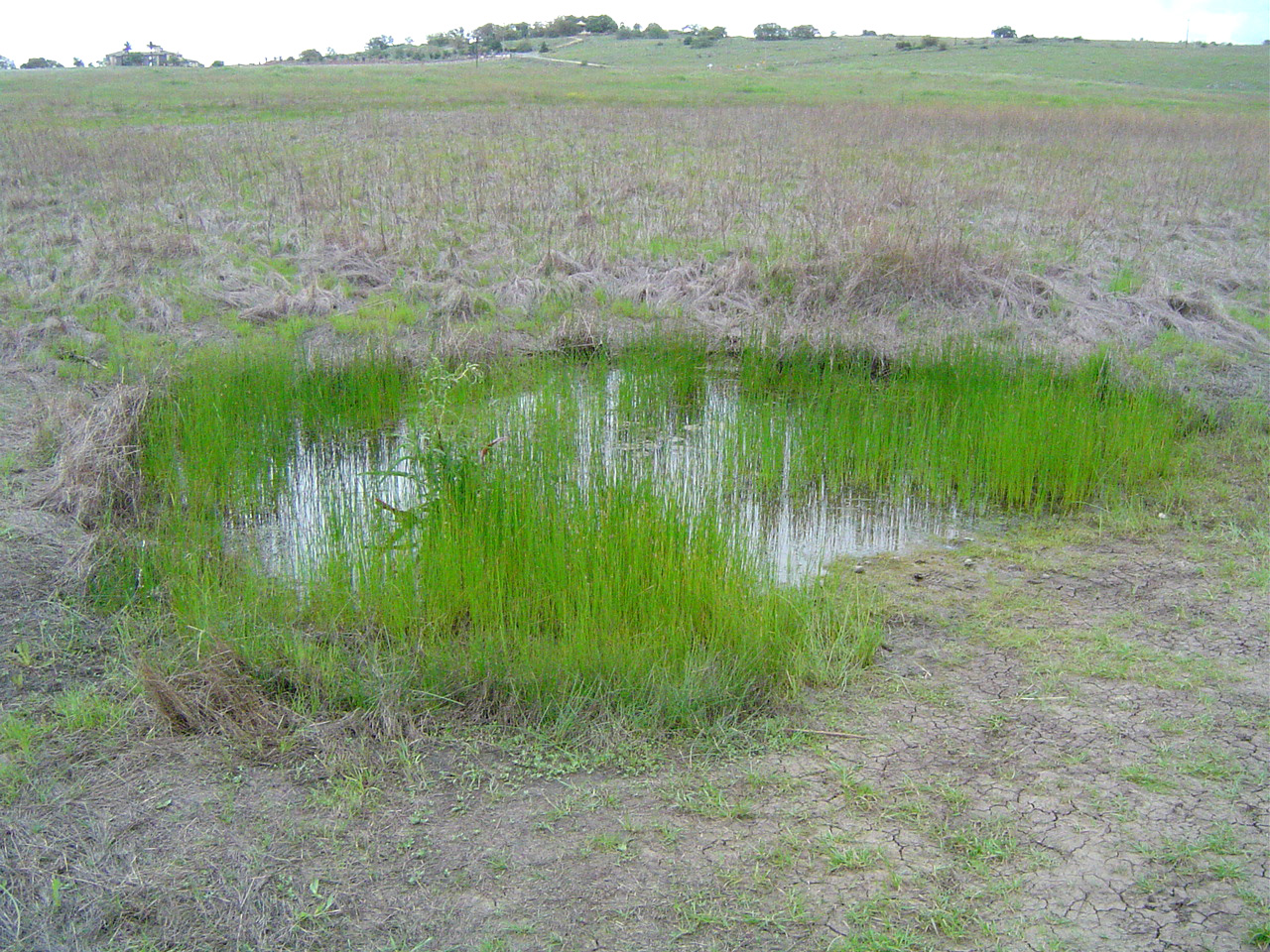
A vernal pool

The Santa Rosa Plateau Ecological Reserve was assembled in several stages; two parcels, comprising 3,100 acres (13 km^{2}), were purchased by The Nature Conservancy in 1984. The intervening parcels were purchased in the 1990s by the State of California, the Riverside County Regional Park and Open-Space District, and the Metropolitan Water District of Southern California.

Although the parcels remain under the ownership of separate agencies, they are managed cooperatively, with biological resource management, which includes prescribed fire and habitat restoration programs managed by the Nature Conservancy, and visitor management. This includes operation of a visitor center and a 40-mile (60 km) trail system, managed by the Riverside County Parks (RivCo Parks).

A non-profit organization, the Santa Rosa Plateau Nature Education Foundation, provides funding for field trips to the Reserve for all third-graders in the area.

== Flowers ==
The Reserve is home to many species of flowers. In one month, March 1998, 50 different wildflowers were reported in bloom.

The best time to view the flowers is in the spring and the best trail for flowers at this time is the Vernal Pool Trail. The one flower people come specifically to the Reserve to see is the Chocolate Lily. It is most often seen in April on the slopes of the Coronado Plateau (the area of the vernal pools). As the vernal pools start to evaporate, flowers grow in concentric circles around them. The most common flower around the vernal pools is the California poppy.

== Mammals ==
The Reserve is known to be home to 27 species of mammal. This includes 12 species of rodents. The mammals include: badger, California myotis, coyote, gray fox, bobcat, mountain lion, California mule deer, opossum, black-tailed jackrabbit, desert cottontail, raccoon, brush mouse, cactus mouse, California ground squirrel, California mouse, California pocket mouse, California vole, deer mouse, desert woodrat, dusky-footed woodrat, Pacific kangaroo rat, pocket gopher, western harvest mouse, gray shrew, striped skunk, long-tailed weasel. Most mammals are nocturnal and so are seldom seen by visitors. However, ground squirrels are diurnal and are regularly seen. Coyotes are probably the second most common seen, then mule deer.

== Birds ==
There have been at least 185 species of bird spotted on the Reserve. Among the larger birds, the mallard, black-shouldered kite, Cooper's hawk, red-shouldered hawk, golden eagle and American kestrel are known to nest on the site. The barn owl and great-horned owl have also had their nestings confirmed.

Anna's hummingbird are found year around on the Reserve while the black-chinned hummingbird is common in the spring and into the summer. If you hear a knocking on wood, it's probably an acorn woodpecker. Although, if it's followed by what sounds like a laugh, it may be a northern flicker. If you hear a commotion in the bushes, it may just be a rufous-sided towhee scratching through the leaf litter for insects and other invertebrates.

== Reptiles ==
The reserve is home to the Southwestern pond turtle. They are on the list of Species of Special Concern. They are not allowed to be taken from their habitat. The longest turtles found on the Reserve are approximately five and a half inches. When they are wet, they are dark, making it easy for them to blend in with the mud at the bottom of ponds. They have webbed feet for efficient swimming and claws, which are used for digging nests, tearing meat, and during courtship. They mainly feed on aquatic invertebrates. They spend most of their lives underwater, which is also where they mate. They leave the water on a daily basis to bask, in order to regulate their body temperature. In southern California, pond turtle populations have declined 95-99%. The Reserve is one of only four to six reproductively viable populations of the Southwestern pond turtle in southern California.

Snakes found on the Ecological Reserve include: San Bernardino ring-necked snake, Hammond's two-striped garter snake, coastal rosy boa, Western yellow-bellied racer, California striped racer, San Joaquin coachwhip, red diamond rattlesnake, Southern Pacific rattlesnake, San Diego gopher snake, California kingsnake.

Other reptiles include: San Diego horned lizard, western fence lizard, granite spiny lizard, side-blotched lizard, western skink, western whiptail, San Diego alligator lizard.

== Amphibians ==
Amphibians found on the Ecological Reserve include: coast range newt, garden slender salamander, black-bellied salamander, western spadefoot toad, Pacific treefrog, California red-legged frog, bullfrog. Bullfrogs are an invasive species, which because of their superior size, takes over territory from native species.

== Geology ==
The oldest rock seen on the Reserve is meta-volcanic rock, laid down 220-190 million years ago. Above that is found meta-sedimentary rock, consisting of slates, argillites and some quartzite and limestone beds. Gabbro, consisting of feldspar, pyroxene and olivine, was laid down 143-101 million years ago. The granite on the Plateau arrived 119-105 million years ago. Arkosic sand and gravel was deposited by flowing water approximately 23-9 million years ago. Olivine basalt is from a lava flow of 9-6 million years ago.

== Lichen ==
Lichen found on rocks on the Reserve include species from genera Fruticose, Squamulose, Foliose, and Crustose. Common species found on large rock outcroppings include common greenshield lichen, beaded rosette lichen, sunken disk lichen and rim lichen. Lichen are a symbiotic relationship between various species of fungus, which provide the structure, and algae, which provide the organism's nutrients.

== Human history ==
The first Native Americans are thought to have inhabited the area for more than 8,000 years. The Native Americans known as Luiseño, due to their connection to the San Luis Rey Mission, began to inhabit the area about 1,500 years ago. It is thought they only used the Plateau during the warm weather months, and to collect acorns in the fall. During the rest of the year they lived in the nearby Temecula Valley. They had a village called Meha near the ranch on the Plateau. The midden found at the village suggests it had been occupied for approximately 6,000 years. When visiting the adobes, one can see indentations in boulders used by the Native Americans to grind acorns and other food.

Before the arrival of Spanish missionaries, the indigenous peoples of Southern California lived in bands, each of which controlled its own territory. The bands interacted with each other through ceremonial exchanges, marriages and trade. Their territories included acorn gathering sites in the mountains. The acorns they liked the best were from the black oak, which only grows above 3,000 feet. In the winter these bands would move to the coast.

In 1798, the mission fathers of San Diego decided there should be a mission between there and San Juan Capistrano. Thus was formed mission San Luis Rey de Francia. Native Americans that fell under the jurisdiction of this new mission were all labeled Luiseño. When Spanish rule ended in 1822, the new Mexican government decreed that mission lands would be secularized. In California this did not happen until 1834. It was during this period that the plateau received its name, probably in honor of Saint Rose of Lima.

In 1846, Juan Moreno was granted 47,000 acres by the Mexican governor of California, Pio Pico. In 1855, Moreno sold Rancho Santa Rosa to Augustin Machado. After he died, the land passed through several hands before being purchased by John Deer of England. After him the land went to his son, Parker Dear. It is said that Parker Dear treated his Native American help like slaves and they would sometimes run away.

In 1904 Walter Vail purchased the land, mainly to raise cattle. When he died, the land went to his son, Mahlon Vail. Mahlon is said to have respected Native American rights to harvest acorns, gather wood and hunt on the Plateau. However, they were not allowed to bunk with the other cowboys and had to live off the ranch.

== See also ==
- California chaparral and woodlands
