= Rancho Little Temecula =

Mexican land grant in California

Coordinates: 33.470°N 117.100°W

Rancho Little Temecula was a 2,233-acre (9.04 km^{2}) Mexican land grant in present-day Riverside County, California given in 1845 by Governor Pío Pico to Pablo Apis. The grant was one of the few held by indigenous people. The grant is south of present-day Temecula and is bordered on the north by Temecula Creek. At the time of the US patent, Rancho Little Temecula was a part of San Diego County. Riverside County was created by the California Legislature in 1893 by taking land from both San Bernardino and San Diego Counties.

== History ==
Pablo Apis (1792–1854) was born a Luiseño and at age six was among the first indigenous people baptized at the Mission San Luis Rey. Apis learned to read and write in Spanish and eventually rose to a position of leadership in which he was the principal spokesman for the local Luiseños. After the missions became secularized in the 1830s, more indigenous people came to live in Temecula, an outpost of Mission San Luis Rey. Apis was one of the Luiseño leaders who fought to keep the Californios from taking control of the mission. Apis was imprisoned for a short time in 1836 by Pío Pico, at that time administrator of Mission San Luis Rey, for objecting to Pico's management of the mission.

In 1843, Apis was given the Temecula area, including the established village center, by Father José María de Zalvidea, a priest briefly in control of the former mission and its lands. Zalvidea appears to have undertaken an initiative to grant native peoples their village lands—other such grants made by Zalvidea include Rancho Guajome and Rancho Cuca. Apis applied for formal ownership of the one-by-one-half-league Rancho Little Temecula grant in 1845 in return for his assistance to the mission. In 1847, Apis was a participant in the Temecula Massacre.

With the cession of California to the United States following the Mexican–American War, the 1848 Treaty of Guadalupe Hidalgo provided that the land grants would be honored. As required by the Land Act of 1851, a claim for Rancho Little Temecula was filed with the Public Land Commission in 1852, but American settlers were not in favor of any indigenous people owning land, and used a variety of procedural tactics to impede the claim's progress. Apis died between 1853 and 1855 before the Commission had decided its fate. In 1856, Isaac Williams, the holder of Rancho Santa Ana del Chino to the north and the parent of grandsons of Apis, helped carry the Little Temecula grant through the court, which decided possession in favor of Apis's daughter and Williams's wife, Maria Antonio Apis. Williams died the same year.

In 1872, Louis Wolf, pioneer storekeeper of Temecula, acquired the Apis grant. The grant was patented to Pablo Apis in 1873. In 1873, Juan Murrieta, Domingo Pujol and Francisco Zanjuro went in together to buy the grant. Two years later, the San Diego County Sheriff forced the indigenous people from their homes in Temecula and led them to what is now known as the Pechanga Indian Reservation.

In 1904 Walter L. Vail, already a successful ranch owner in Arizona, started buying ranch land in the Temecula Valley; buying Rancho Santa Rosa, Rancho Temecula, Rancho Pauba and the northern half of Rancho Little Temecula. The Vails continued to operate their cattle ranch for the next sixty years. In 1964, the Vails sold the ranch to the Kaiser Steel Company, which master-planned the community of Rancho California, which now comprises the cities of Temecula and Murrieta.

== Historic sites of the Rancho ==
=== Apis Adobe ===
Apis built two adobes on his land; the second is still referred to as the Apis Adobe. Apis built the later adobe house on the south side of Temecula Creek at the point where the road, part of the Southern Emigrant Trail, crossed the creek to the north side of the creek, just upstream from the Luiseño village on the creek. In 1858, the Apis Adobe had become the location of the Temecula stagecoach station of the Butterfield Overland Mail. The foundation of the building was studied and archaeologically excavated in 1989, in anticipation of new development. In 1990, the adobe site was bulldozed.

=== Wolf Store ===
The Wolf Store was built by Louis Wolf on the north bank of Temecula Creek, on the west side of the place where the old road from Los Angeles to Fort Yuma crossed the creek. It was directly across the creek from the old Luiseño village and northwest of the Apis Adobe, the former Butterfeild Overland Mail stage station. It was the center of the old settlement of Temecula before the town relocated to the west along the railroad. Later the building was incorporated into the Vail Ranch headquarters; the store still remains. The store is now part of Vail Headquarters, a shopping center built around the ranch headquarters buildings.

== See also ==
- Ranchos of California
- List of Ranchos of California
