= Willow Springs Station =

Overland Mail stagecoach stop in California

Coordinates: 33°31′37″N 117°10′21″W

Willow Springs Station was a changing station at Alamos or Willow Springs along the Second Division route of the Butterfield Overland Mail, in what is now Murrieta, in Riverside County, California. It was also known as Alamos, Clines's or Kline's, or Willows, was one of the later Butterfield Overland Mail stations, placed in 1859, between some of the original stations for changing teams and providing water between stops in hot dry areas. Willow Springs, also originally known as Alamos Springs, was located west of the hills that line the east side of the Temecula Valley, on land of the Rancho Temecula, near Santa Gertrudis Creek on the low flood plain of Murrieta Creek, between Santa Gertrudis and Warm Springs Creek.

== History ==
Alamos Springs was originally a camping ground with good water on the Southern Emigrant Trail during the California Gold Rush. In 1853, squatters David Cline (or Kline) and William Moody, started a ranch at these springs that was described by Benjamin Ignatius Hayes who visited it on January 14–15, 1861:

Six miles brings us to the Willow Station. Cordially met by Mr. Clift, the road-agent. ... Mr. –––––, who was riding along in company, had started ahead to have supper ready, so when we arrived we had not long to wait. Rough supper, however; no coffee; beds on the floor. Moody is talkative, as four years ago; and kept on after he had gone to the next room; but Kline telling him I wished to sleep, he closed. A pretty good sleep before the fire; good to see once more an old-fashioned western chimney. Of course, travellers do not stay at any of the Overland Stations, unless in case of clear necessity.

Kline and Moody have been here 7 years, have 200 acres under fence. Report says they are worth $20,000, made here. They formerly raised grain, found it unprofitable; too far to market. They cut a great deal of hay every season; it is excellent; four kinds of clover, besides the pin-grass. Their stock in fine condition. Kline is from Pennsylvania. ... He settled here supposing it would turn out to be government land; in the uncertainty about this, he has not made any very valuable improvements. His tract is claimed by Don Luis Vignes, of Los Angeles, or his assignees.

There is a trail from Temecula to San Juan. To San Bernardino from here, passing Agua Mansa if you choose, a first-rate road, with sufficient water and bunch-grass at this season, and indeed in summer, for the traveller. To Warner's Rancho from here the distance is 39 miles, according to the Overland Mail estimate; from Warner's to Fort Yuma 158 miles, to Gila City 18 miles further.

Standing on Kline's porch Mount San Bernardino looms up due north, San Jacinto more to the east, both very plain, and in this atmosphere seeming much nearer than they are.

From Kline's, passing a dozen huts belonging to the Indians within a common fence, (ground in cultivation), we begin in 4 or 5 miles to ascend gradually into the pass of Temecula mountain, ...

The station continued in use after the Overland Mail shut down, it remained in use during the American Civil War as a camp for Union Army troops. Company D, 2nd Cavalry, California Volunteers was described at the Post at Kline's Ranch in the Spring of 1862 by Lt. Col. Richard C. Drum in his report of his tour of inspection of forces in Southern California. With the grant of Rancho Temecula patented to Jean-Louis Vignes in 1860, Kline and Moody had failed to acquire title to the land and probably like many others lost their ranch during the Great Drought of 1863–64.

== The site today ==
Today the site is located within a business park near the present-day intersection of Cherry Avenue and Jefferson Avenue in Murrieta. To the south, in Temecula, some open land of the Kline's Ranch still remains as a flood control basin, near Santa Gertrudis Creek with Alamos, (Populus sect. Aigeiros) still growing along the old creek bed.
