= Black Mountain (San Diego County, California) =

Mountain in San Diego County, California

- Location within San Diego County, California Location within California

Highest point
- Elevation: 4,048 ft (1,234 m) NAVD 88
- Prominence: 751 ft (229 m)
- Listing: San Diego Peak list
- Coordinates: 33°09′36″N 116°48′29″W

Geography
- Location: San Diego County, California, U.S.
- Topo map: USGS Mesa Grande

Climbing
- Easiest route: Hike, class 1

Black Mountain (Kumiai: Chiirii) is a summit in the Cleveland National Forest of the Peninsular Ranges in eastern San Diego County, California, north of Ramona. The peak is measured at 4,048 feet (1,234 m), and is sometimes referenced as Big Black Mountain to distinguish it from the smaller Rancho Peñasquitos Black Mountain Open Space Park in the city of San Diego. Black Mountain offers a WX channel for people who wish to tune in on radios to hear the weather; the channel is located on VHF frequency 162.4000 MHz.

Black Mountain is home to one of the largest remaining tracts of the threatened Engelmann oak (Quercus engelmannii).
