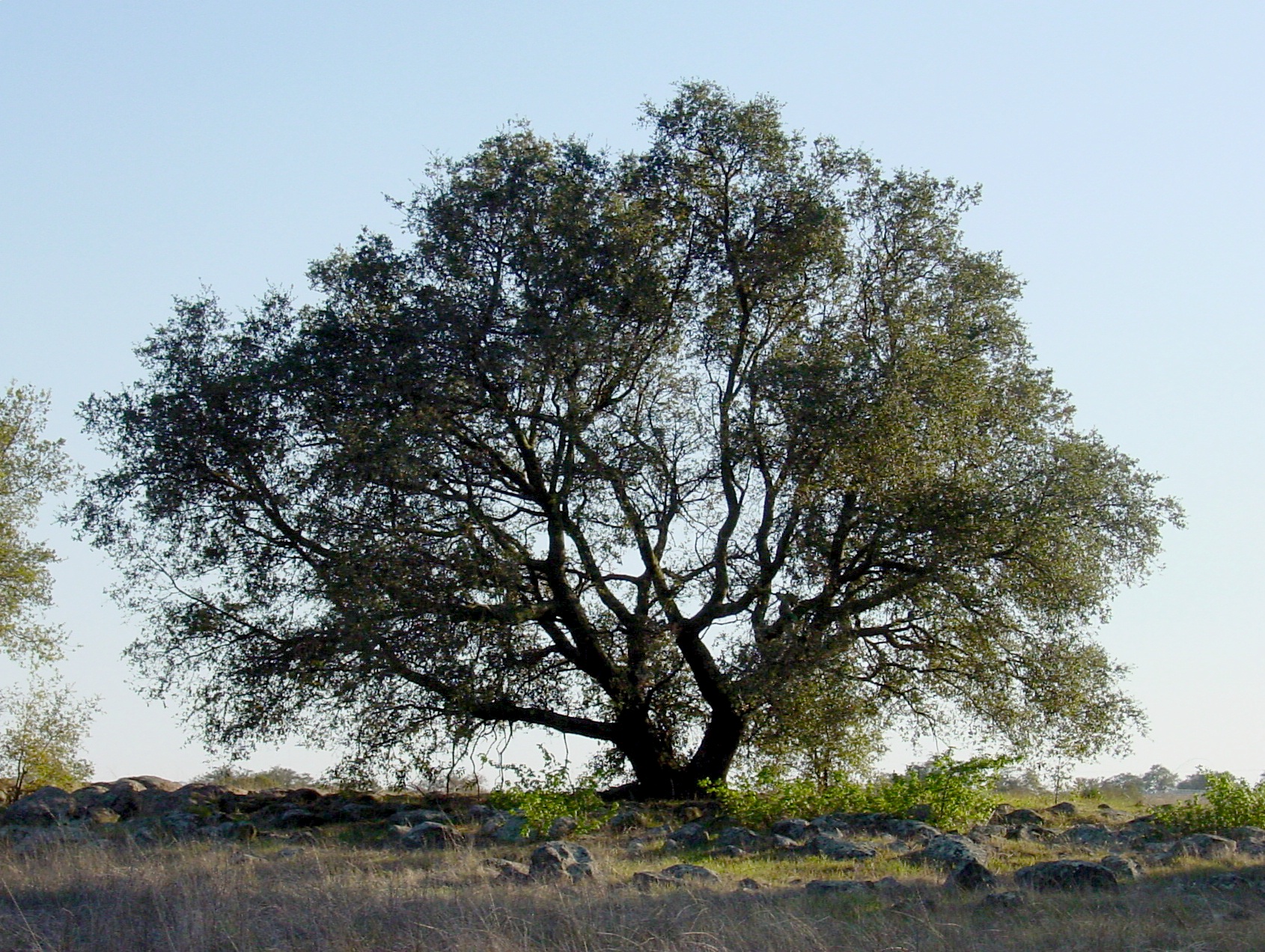

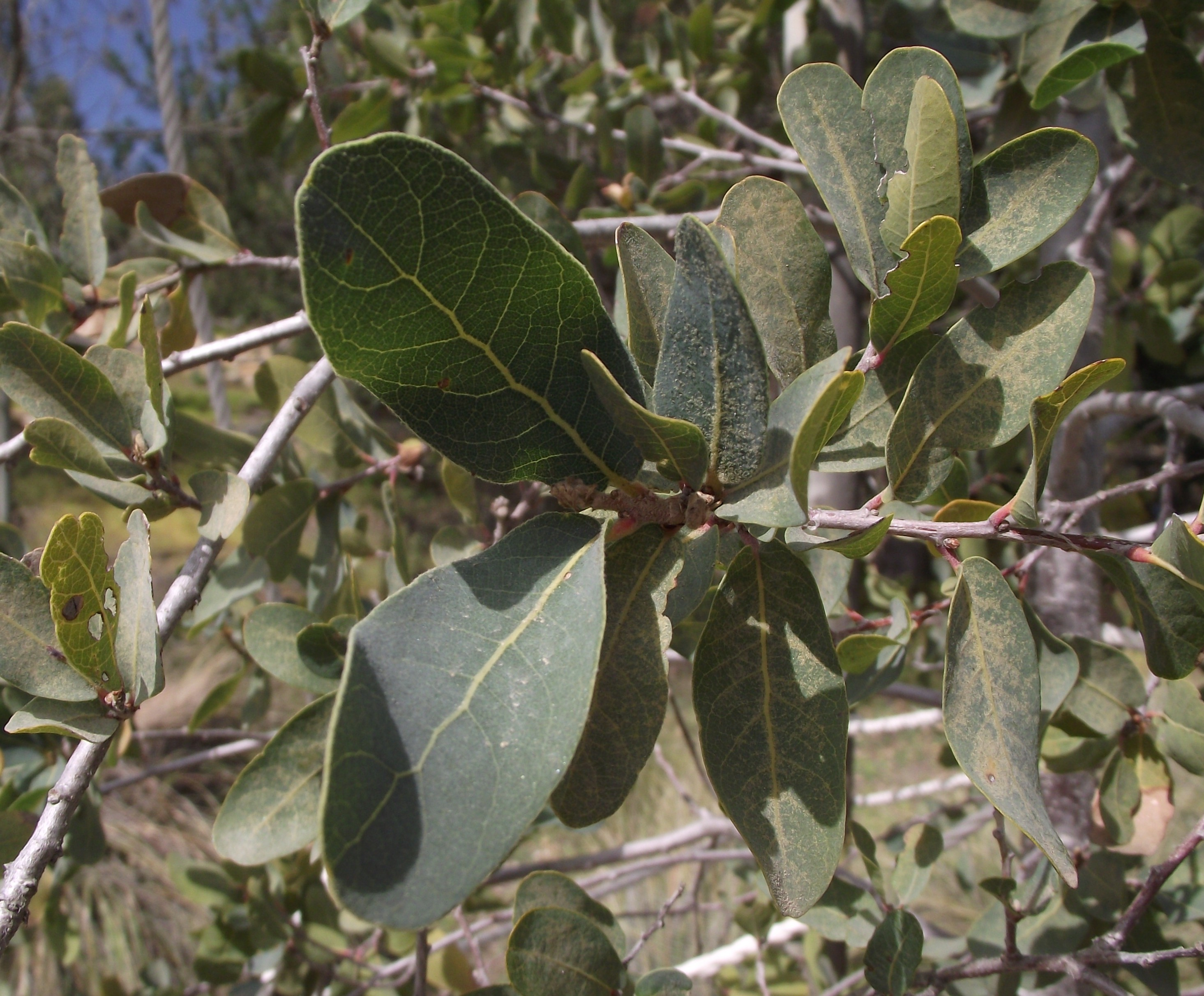

Conservation status
- Endangered (IUCN 3.1)

- Vulnerable (NatureServe)

Scientific classification
- Kingdom: Plantae
- Clade: Embryophytes
- Clade: Tracheophytes
- Clade: Spermatophytes
- Clade: Angiosperms
- Clade: Eudicots
- Clade: Rosids
- Order: Fagales
- Family: Fagaceae
- Genus: Quercus
- Subgenus: Quercus subg. Quercus
- Section: Quercus sect. Quercus
- Species: Q. engelmannii

Binomial name
- Quercus engelmannii Greene
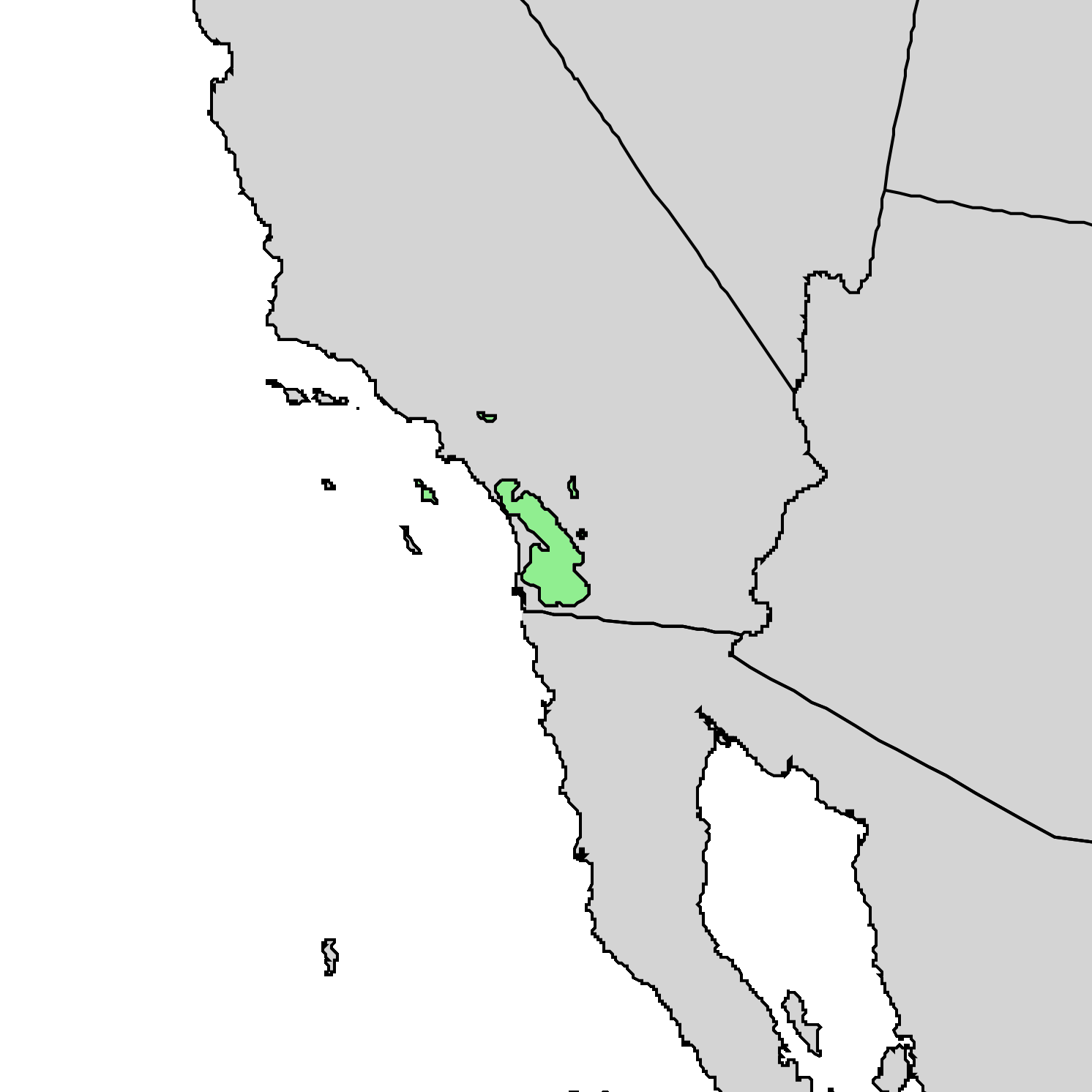
- Natural US range of Quercus engelmannii

= Quercus engelmannii =

Species of oak tree

Quercus engelmannii, the Engelmann oak or Pasadena oak, is a species of oak in the white oak section (Quercus sect. Quercus), native to Southern California and northwestern Baja California, Mexico.

== Description ==
Quercus engelmannii is a small tree growing to 10 metres (33 feet) tall, generally evergreen, but may be drought-deciduous during the hot, dry local summers, and has a rounded or elliptical canopy. The bark is thick, furrowed, and light gray-brown. The leaves are leathery, 3–6 centimetres (1 1/4–2 1/4 inches) long and 1–2 cm (1/2–3/4 in) broad, of a blue-green color, and may be flat or wavy, with smooth margins. The flowers are catkins; the fruit is an acorn 1.5–2.5 cm (1/2–1 in) long, maturing 6–8 months after pollination.

The wood is dark brown and strong, but tends to warp and split upon drying, and is of low value as timber.

== Distribution ==
The Engelmann oak ranges from the foothills of the San Gabriel Mountains in eastern Los Angeles County through the Santa Ana Mountains of Orange County and the western foothills and mesas of the Peninsular Ranges in Riverside and San Diego counties, extending into the Sierra Juárez and Sierra de San Pedro Mártir ranges of northern Baja California. It is generally found in savannas and woodlands above the dry coastal plain, but below the 1,300 m (4,300 ft) elevation where colder winters prevail. The Engelmann oak has a smaller range than most California oaks, and suburban sprawl in the San Gabriel Valley has eliminated the oaks from most of the northern part of the range. The largest remaining stands of Engelmann oaks are on the Santa Rosa Plateau, near Murrieta in Riverside County, and on Black Mountain near Ramona in San Diego County.

Fossil evidence shows that Engelmann oaks once had a wider range, extending through what is now the Mojave and Sonoran deserts into eastern California and Arizona. The Engelmann oak is most closely related to the Arizona white oak (Q. arizonica) and Arizona blue oak (Q. oblongifolia), which are native to the subtropical pine-oak woodlands of Arizona and northern Mexico. The Engelmann oak is considered to be the northernmost species of subtropical oak, which was isolated from its closest relatives to the east by the drying of the southwestern deserts.
