= Rancho Pauba =

Land grant in California, United States

Coordinates: 33.530°N 117.050°W

Rancho Pauba was a 26,598-acre (107.64 km^{2}) Mexican land grant in present-day Riverside County, California given in 1844 by Governor Manuel Micheltorena to Vicente Moraga and Luis Arenas. The grant was just east of present-day Temecula. At the time of the US patent, Rancho Pauba was a part of San Diego County. Riverside County was created by the California Legislature in 1893 by taking land from both San Bernardino and San Diego Counties.

== History ==
Vincent Moraga and Luis Arenas, both officials in Pueblo de Los Angeles, were granted six square leagues in the Temecula Valley that was formerly part of the lands of the Mission San Luis Rey. Frenchman Jean-Louis Vignes (Juan Luis Vignes) acquired Rancho Pauba in 1848. Vignes owned both Rancho Pauba and the adjacent Rancho Temecula.

With the cession of California to the United States following the Mexican-American War, the 1848 Treaty of Guadalupe Hidalgo provided that the land grants would be honored. As required by the Land Act of 1851, a claim for Rancho Pauba was filed with the Public Land Commission in 1852, and the grant was patented to Jean-Louis Vignes in 1860.

In 1872 sheep ranchers Juan and Ezekial Murrieta, began to move their flocks away from Merced in search of water. A year later they came into the Temecula Valley. In 1873, the Murrieta brothers formed a partnership with a Spanish-born San Francisco lawyer Domingo Pujol and Francisco Sanjurjo and purchased the Rancho Pauba and Rancho Temecula in 1875. In 1876 they divided their holdings, with the Murrietas taking the area near the town that now bears their name, and Domingo Pujol acquired the major portion of Rancho Temecula and Rancho Pauba. Pujol returned to Spain to marry, and died there in 1881. After his death, his widow, Mercedes Pujol, came from Spain to settle his estate. She sold land to the Pauba Land and Water Company that was later sold to the Vails.

In 1904 Walter L. Vail, already a successful ranch owner in Arizona, started buying ranch land in the Temecula Valley; buying Rancho Santa Rosa, Rancho Temecula, Rancho Pauba and the northern half of Rancho Little Temecula. By 1905, the 87,000-acre Vail Ranch became one of the largest cattle operations in California, stretching from Camp Pendleton to Vail Lake to Murrieta. Vail was killed by a street car in Los Angeles in 1906, and his son, Mahlon Vail, took over the family ranch. The Vails continued to operate their cattle ranch for the next sixty years. In 1964, the Vails sold the ranch to the Kaiser Steel Company, which master-planned the community of Rancho California, which now comprises the cities of Temecula and Murrieta.
