= Linda Rosa, California =

Coordinates: 33°31′45″N 117°10′31″W

Linda Rosa, or Linda Rose, is a former populated place, formerly in San Diego County, now in Riverside County, California.

== Location and etymology ==
The town site of Linda Rosa was located southwest of old town of Murrieta, California on the west side of Murrieta Creek. Linda Rosa is a name derived from Spanish, meaning "pretty rose."

== History ==
Linda Rosa was one of many land development schemes in the 1880s in Southern California. In 1887, the Santa Rosa Land & Improvement Company, belonging to Englishman Parker Dear, owner of the Rancho Santa Rosa, subdivided the 400-acre Linda Rosa Tract southwest of Murrieta along the California Southern Railroad line. The company spent approximately $5,000 building a depot, but the railroad did not make Linda Rosa a scheduled stop. The Linda Rosa Hotel was built by the land company in 1888 at an estimated cost of $15,000. The large hotel provided lodging for visitors and potential land buyers.

The Linda Rosa Fruit Canning and Preserving Company was formed on June 30, 1888, to grow and can fruits and vegetables. Linda Rosa had its own post office, Linda Rose, from November 20, 1888, to March 20, 1890. When the land boom went bust and the town lots failed to sell, the office was closed and mail service was moved to Temecula Station. The hotel was torn down and the materials used to build a house. With the failure of his development, Parker Dear went bankrupt and lost the rancho to his bank in 1893.

== See also ==
- List of ghost towns in California
