= Rancho Temecula =

Mexican land grant in California

Coordinates: 33.550°N 117.170°W

Rancho Temecula was a 26,609-acre (107.68 km^{2}) Mexican land grant in present-day Riverside County, California given on December 14, 1844 by Governor Manuel Micheltorena to Feliz Valdez. The grant extended south along the east bank Murrieta Creek to Temecula Creek and encompassed present-day Temecula, Murrieta and Murrieta Hot Springs. At the time of the US patent, Rancho Temecula was a part of San Diego County. Riverside County was created by the California Legislature in 1893 by taking land from both San Bernardino and San Diego Counties.

== History ==
Felix Valdes, a Mexican army officer, was granted Rancho Temecula, six square leagues (18,500 hectares or 45,800 acres) in the Temecula Valley that was formerly part of the lands of the Mission San Luis Rey. In 1846, Felix Valdes sold Rancho Temecula to Frenchman Jean-Louis Vignes (Juan Luis Vignes). Vignes owned both Rancho Temecula and the adjacent Rancho Pauba.

With the cession of California to the United States following the Mexican–American War, the 1848 Treaty of Guadalupe Hidalgo provided that the land grants would be honored. As required by the Land Act of 1851, a claim for Rancho Temecula was filed with the Public Land Commission in 1852. In 1853, squatters David Cline (or Kline) and William Moody, started a ranch with 200 acres fenced in, growing wheat and cutting hay at Alamos Springs on the land of the rancho, in an attempt to challenge the title. Kline's Ranch, as it became known, became an overnight stopping place for travelers and later became a swing station of the Butterfield Overland Mail, known as Alamos or Willow Springs Station, near the present-day intersection of Cherry Street and Jefferson Avenue. However, the grant was patented to Jean-Louis Vignes in 1860. Kline's Ranch remained as a stage station until the Butterfeild route was closed by the American Civil War. It then became a Union Army cavalry camp in 1862, part of the supply route for Fort Yuma and the California Column march into New Mexico Territory.

In 1872, sheep ranchers Juan and Ezekial Murrieta began to move their flocks away from Merced in search of water. A year later, they came to the Temecula Valley. In 1873, the Murrieta brothers formed a partnership with a Spanish born San Francisco lawyer Domingo Pujol and Francisco Sanjurjo and purchased the Rancho Pauba and Rancho Temecula in 1875. In 1876, they divided their holdings, with the Murrietas taking the area near the town that now bears their name, and Domingo Pujol acquired the major portion of Rancho Temecula and Rancho Pauba. Pujol returned to Spain to marry, and died there in 1881. After his death, his widow, Mercedes Torres de Pujol, came from Spain to settle his estate. She sold land to the Pauba Land and Water Company that was later sold to the Vails.

In 1904, Walter L. Vail, already a successful ranch owner in Arizona, started buying ranch land in the Temecula Valley; buying Rancho Santa Rosa, Rancho Temecula, Rancho Pauba and the northern half of Rancho Little Temecula. By 1905, the 87,000 acre Vail Ranch became one of the largest cattle operations in California, stretching from Camp Pendleton to Vail Lake to Murrieta. Vail was killed by a street car in Los Angeles in 1906, and his son, Mahlon Vail, took over the family ranch. The Vails continued to operate their cattle ranch for the next sixty years. In 1964, the Vails sold the ranch to the Kaiser Steel Company, which master-planned Rancho California, the communities that today comprise the cities of Temecula and Murrieta.

== See also ==
- Ranchos of California
- List of Ranchos of California
