= Helothermine =

Helothermine (or HLTx) is a toxin from the venom of the Mexican beaded lizard, Heloderma horridum horridum. Helothermine inhibits ryanodine receptors, calcium channels and potassium channels. Helothermine can cause lethargy, partial paralysis of rear limbs and lowering of the body temperature.

== Etymology ==
The name of the toxin helothermine is derived from its source, a Heloderma lizard, and one of its effects in mice, the induction of hypothermia.

== Sources ==
Helothermine is a toxin found in the venom (salivary secretion) of the Mexican beaded lizard Heloderma horridum horridum, one of the four subspecies of the beaded lizard. Besides helothermine the venom of the Mexican beaded lizard also contains at least three other toxins and several enzymes.

== Chemistry ==
The peptide HLTx consists of 242 amino acids residues in a single polypeptide chain. It is stabilized with eight disulfide bridges and has a molecular weight of 25.5 kDa. The iso-electric point is 6.8 and the N-terminal amino acid sequence is: Glu-Ala-Ser-Pro-Lys-Leu-Pro-Gly-Leu-Met-Thr-Ser-Asn-Pro-Asp-Gln-Gln-Thr- Glu-Ile. HLTx shows no structural similarities with any of the known sodium-, potassium- or calcium channel-specific toxins. Its highest similarities are found with a family of cysteine-rich secretory proteins (CRISP), found in both human and in mice testes.

== Target and mode of action ==
HLTx inhibits ryanodine receptors of sarcoplasmic reticulum and both calcium channels and potassium channels.

=== Calcium channels ===
The effects of HLTx on voltage-dependent calcium channels have been tested in granule cells of the cerebellum. In these cells, HLTx inhibits up to 67% of the calcium currents, acting on multiple subtypes. This inhibition is reversible, concentration-dependent and practically voltage-independent. No effects on the activation and inactivation kinetics were observed. A small shift in the steady-state inactivation curve has been reported. IC50 is 0.25 μM.

=== Potassium Channels ===
HLTx inhibits both delayed rectifier and A-type potassium channels in cerebellar granular cells. HLTx reduces the A-type current in a voltage and concentration-dependent way, with an IC50 of 0.52 μM. It slows down both the activation and the inactivation kinetics of the A-type current. The block of the delayed-rectifier current is not voltage-dependent, but only concentration-dependent, with an IC50 of 0.83 μM.

=== Ryanodine receptor ===
The ryanodine receptor, both in skeletal and in cardiac sarcoplasmic reticulum (SR), is inhibited by HLTx. The affinity of the toxin is much higher for the skeletal- than for the cardiac SR receptors, but binding is reversible in both cases.

== Toxicity ==
The main effect of HTLx appears to be the induction of hypothermia. Other effects caused by the toxin include lethargy, intestinal distension/diarrhea and paralysis of the rear limbs. Sporadic tonic convulsions can occur when the intoxicated animals are touched on the dorsal parts of their body. The specific toxins of the Mexican beaded lizard were probably evolved to immobilize its prey, as these lizards move very slowly.
