= Rancho Santa Rosa (Moreno) =

Mexican land grant in California

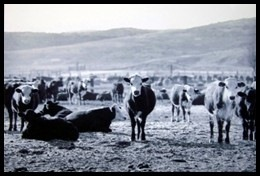
- Cattle at Rancho Santa Rosa in 1895

- Location within California
- 33.55°N 117.27°W
- Location: Santa Rosa Plateau, near Murrieta, California

California Historical Landmark
- Reference no.: 1005

Rancho Santa Rosa was a 47,815-acre (193.50 km^{2}) Mexican land grant in present day Riverside County, California given in 1846 by Governor Pio Pico to Juan Moreno. At the time of the US patent, Rancho Santa Rosa was a part of San Diego County. Riverside County was created by the California Legislature in 1893 by taking land from both San Bernardino and San Diego Counties. The site is now registered as a California Historical Landmark.

== History ==
The Santa Rosa Plateau became Rancho Santa Rosa under an 1846 Mexican land grant to cattle and sheep rancher Juan Moreno.

With the cession of California to the United States following the Mexican-American War, the 1848 Treaty of Guadalupe Hidalgo provided that the land grants would be honored. As required by the Land Act of 1851, a claim for Rancho Santa Rosa was filed with the Public Land Commission in 1852, and the grant was patented to Juan Moreno in 1872.

Moreno sold the rancho to Augustin Machado in 1855. Machado subsequently purchased neighboring Rancho La Laguna in 1858. In 1876, Rancho Santa Rosa was sold to Englishman John Dear, who had sent his son, Parker, from England to inspect the rancho lands. He stayed to run it for the next 18 years, trying to make it a profitable venture. Flood events that twice destroyed the railroad connection of the California Southern Railroad with San Diego, cutting economical transportation to and from his ranch and development projects at Linda Rosa. Parker Dear was forced to put the ranch into receivership in 1894. Walter Vail, already a successful ranch owner in Arizona and owner of Santa Rosa Island, bought Rancho Santa Rosa in 1904. The Vails continued to operate their cattle ranch for the next sixty years. In 1964, the Vails sold the ranch to the Kaiser Steel Company, which master-planned Rancho California – the communities that today comprise the cities of Temecula and Murrieta.

A large portion of Rancho Santa Rosa lands were purchased to create the Santa Rosa Plateau Ecological Reserve. It was assembled in several stages by The Nature Conservancy in 1984. Subsequently parcels were purchased in the 1990s by the State of California, the Riverside County Regional Park and Open Space District, and the Metropolitan Water District of Southern California.

== Historic sites of the Rancho ==
- Moreno and Machado Adobes. Two unrestored mid-19th-century rancho adobes that are Riverside County's oldest standing structures. Also nearby are the Vail Ranch Barn, the ranch foreman's house, the ruins of the Dear – Vail Ranch-house and a Luiseno village site.

The 8,300-acre (34 km^{2}) reserve now has four owners: the California Department of Fish and Game, Riverside County, the Metropolitan Water District of Southern California, and The Nature Conservancy.
