= Doheny State Beach =

State park in California, United States

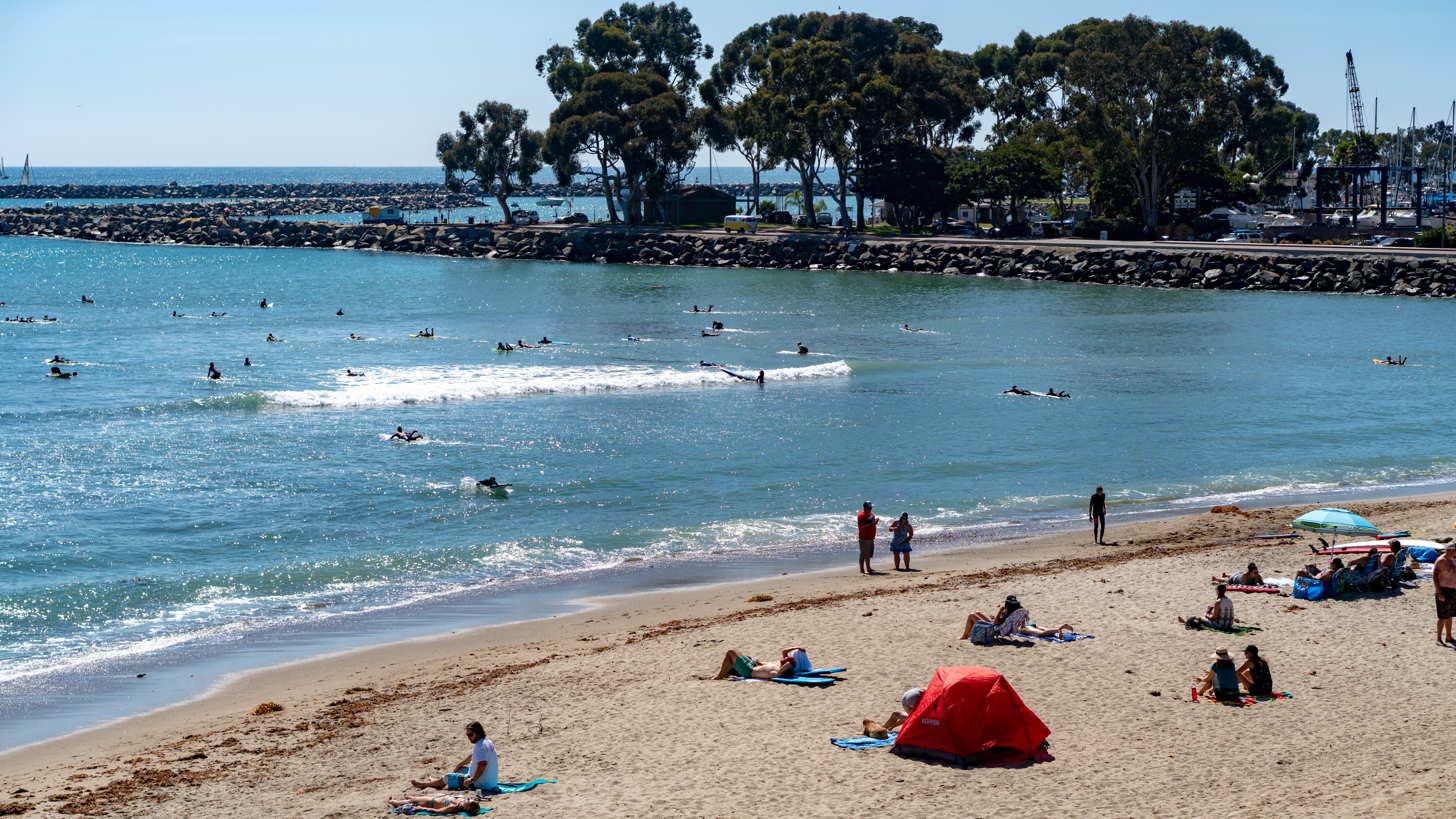
- Doheny State Beach in September 2018. Dana Point Harbor can be seen in the background.

- Location within the Los Angeles metropolitan area Location within California Location within the United States
- Interactive map of Doheny State Beach
- Location: Orange County, California
- Nearest city: Dana Point, California
- Coordinates: 33°27′39″N 117°40′41″W
- Area: 254 acres (103 ha)
- Established: 1931
- Visitors: 850,000+ (in 2007)
- Governing body: California Department of Parks and Recreation

Doheny State Beach (known colloquially as Doho) is known as the first state beach in the California state park system. Located on the Pacific Ocean in the city of Dana Point, the beach is adjacent to several surf spots and scenic beaches including Salt Creek Beach, Baby Beach, and Capistrano Beach. Along with its neighbors, Doheny beach is a popular surf spot located at the mouth of San Juan Creek, which flows from the Santa Ana Mountains southwest to the beach, where it forms a fresh-water lagoon.

== History ==
The original inhabitants of Doheny were the Acjachemen (Juaneno) tribe who occupied the land that is now considered Orange County. It is estimated that they inhabited the land for close to 9,000 years before their first contact with Europeans in 1769 with Gaspar de Portola and his Spanish soldiers and Franciscan missionaries. The presence of the Spanish and missionaries led to the eventual end of the Acjachemen settlement and culture through strenuous labor, disease, and confinement and also led to the construction of Mission San Juan Capistrano in the middle of an Acjachemen village in 1776.

The beach is named after Edward L. Doheny who in 1893, borrowed money to dig the City of Dana Point's first oil well and struck oil 200 feet deep, creating an oil empire from the initial investment. And on May 31, 1931, right before he died, the beach was donated for public use. This became the California’s first state beach.

On July 1, 1963, the beach was named Doheny State Beach in his honor. The original donation was 41 acres (17 ha). An additional 21 acres (8.5 ha) was later added by acquisitions from the Santa Fe Railroad, University of California Regents, and the Union Oil Company. An additional 192 acres (78 ha) not owned by the state are included in the site's official total area.

In the late 1930s, the Civilian Conservation Corps built campgrounds, picnic areas, and custodian lodges in Doho under the "New Deal" program under the Roosevelt administration. The structures are now mostly gone, with some remnants remaining.

In October 2022, the California Coastal Commission approved Doheny Desalination Plant that will draw water offshore from the state beach and will be capable of producing 5 to 15 million gallons of fresh water per day.

In June 2023, California State Parks, the County of Orange, and the city of Dana Point announced a four-month long sand replenishment project that aims to offset coastal erosion and diminishing sand input from local sources. The plan is to place 45,000 cubic yards of sand in Doheny State Beach and Capistrano Beach Park, covering about 1,775 feet of the beach. This is meant to be a temporary solution to protect the California coastline and public facilities while officials look for a more long-term solution. The California coastline has been rapidly eroding, causing concern, and there is a need for policymakers and land-use planners to develop effective strategies for coastal management. The sand being brought in is from the Santa Ana River and has been thoroughly screened to match the sand typical in beaches and will be safe for a public beach. This project also aims to avoid and minimize the ecological impact on the environment and local wildlife. There is hope that nesting birds that prefer sandy beaches will be encouraged to return to the area.

== Surf culture ==
The city of Dana Point, the home of Doheny, was once one of the most attractive surf epicenters of Southern California for its incredible waves, the most famous being "Killer Dana".

"Killer Dana" was known as a "brutal" right hander wave that was located at the headland, very close to Doheny. The wave attracted people all over to watch, surf, and live by the surf breaks of Dana Point, boosting the areas economy, but most importantly, culminating in both a rich culture and deep respect for California's natural ecosystems.

The first talks of the installation of a harbor right at the headland shocked and angered the residents of Dana Point. The idea was first heard in 1964 when it was said the Dana Point Chamber of Commerce was seeking government and military assistance for the installation of the harbor. Despite local outcry for the waves, culture, and local ecosystems, the wave was killed on August 29, 1966, along with a large part of the city's culture and natural ecosystems.

The installation of the harbor changed the surf at Doheny's beaches but its vibrant surf lifestyle still remains strong. The surf break in Doheny is known to be a beginner level spot while its neighbor break Strands is considered experienced. It's well-known for its consistent reef break and long rides (on good days can be 300m).

There are four "takeoff spots" within Doheny:

- "Boneyard"
- "Doheny Rivermouth"
- "Second Spot"
- "The Hammer"

== Amenities ==
=== Recreational uses ===
The beach covers an area of 62 acres (25 ha) and includes a day use surfing beach at the northern end, as well as campgrounds in its southern area. The beach is one of California's most popular camping grounds and attracts over 850,000 people per year. The beach has tide pools and a visitor center with several aquariums.

=== Ecology ===
The beach is home to several types of marine life, such as abalone, sea anemone, several types of sea bass, crabs, the common dolphin, harbor seal, kelp, California moray, sea urchin, octopus, stingrays, several varieties of sharks (including the great white), as well as many other marine life. Several types of birds also live at the beach such as brown pelican, great blue heron, snowy egret, and several other species.

The area is known for its mild weather, making Doheny Beach especially attractive. Average summer temperatures range in high 70s while winters typically only reach low to mid 60s

=== Educational program ===
Doheny State Beach offers year-round interpretive education programs in marine life, bird life, animal life, water quality, insects, and Native American studies.

== In popular culture ==
- The beach is mentioned in several surf rock songs including the Beach Boys songs "Surfin' Safari" and "Surfin' U.S.A." In "Surfer Joe" by the Surfaris, Doheny Beach is the favorite hangout of the song's protagonist. Jan & Dean's "Dead Man's Curve" also mentions Doheny, but that refers to Doheny Drive, which intersects Sunset Boulevard near the west end of the Sunset Strip in West Hollywood.

== Gallery ==
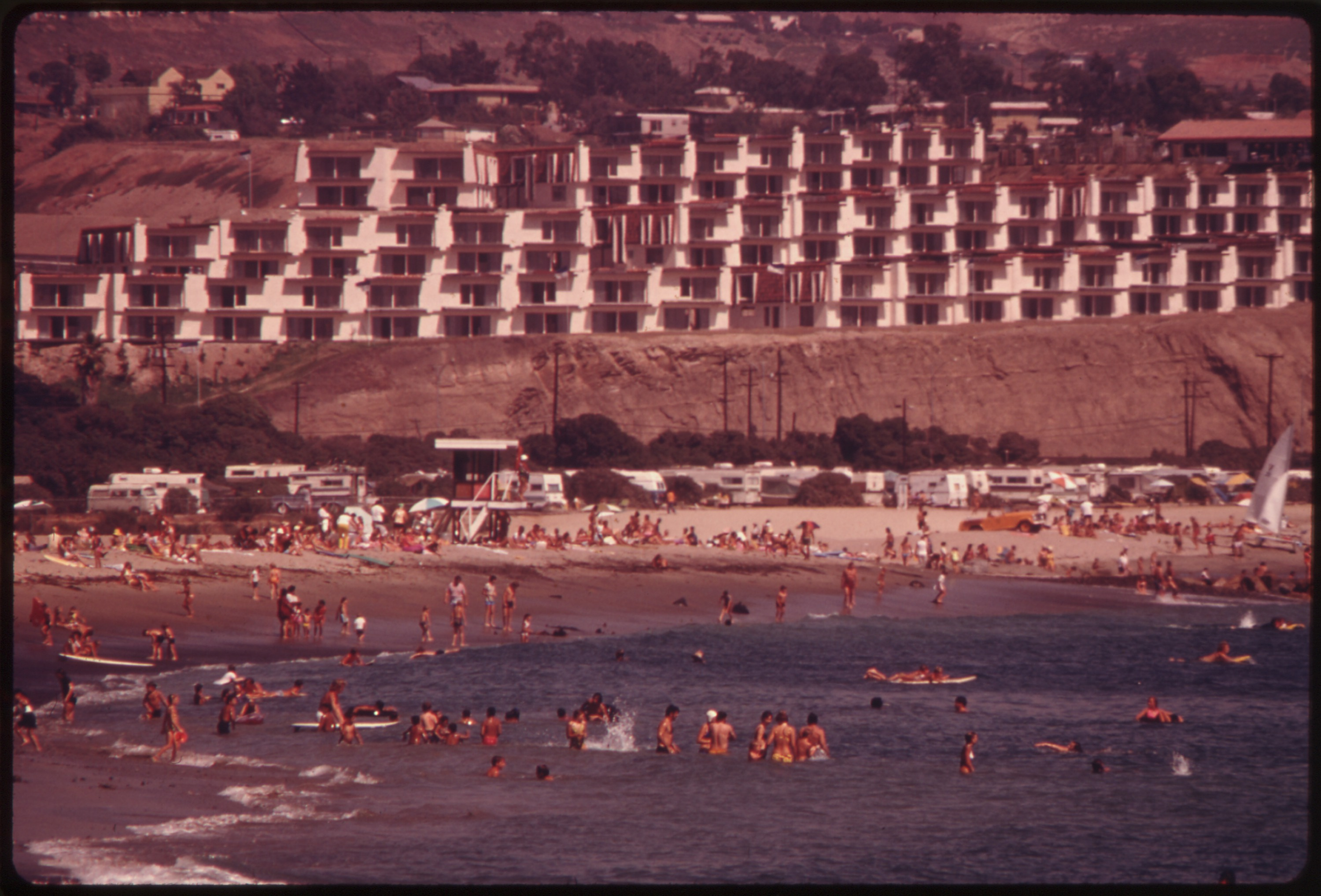
Doheny State Beach in September 1974

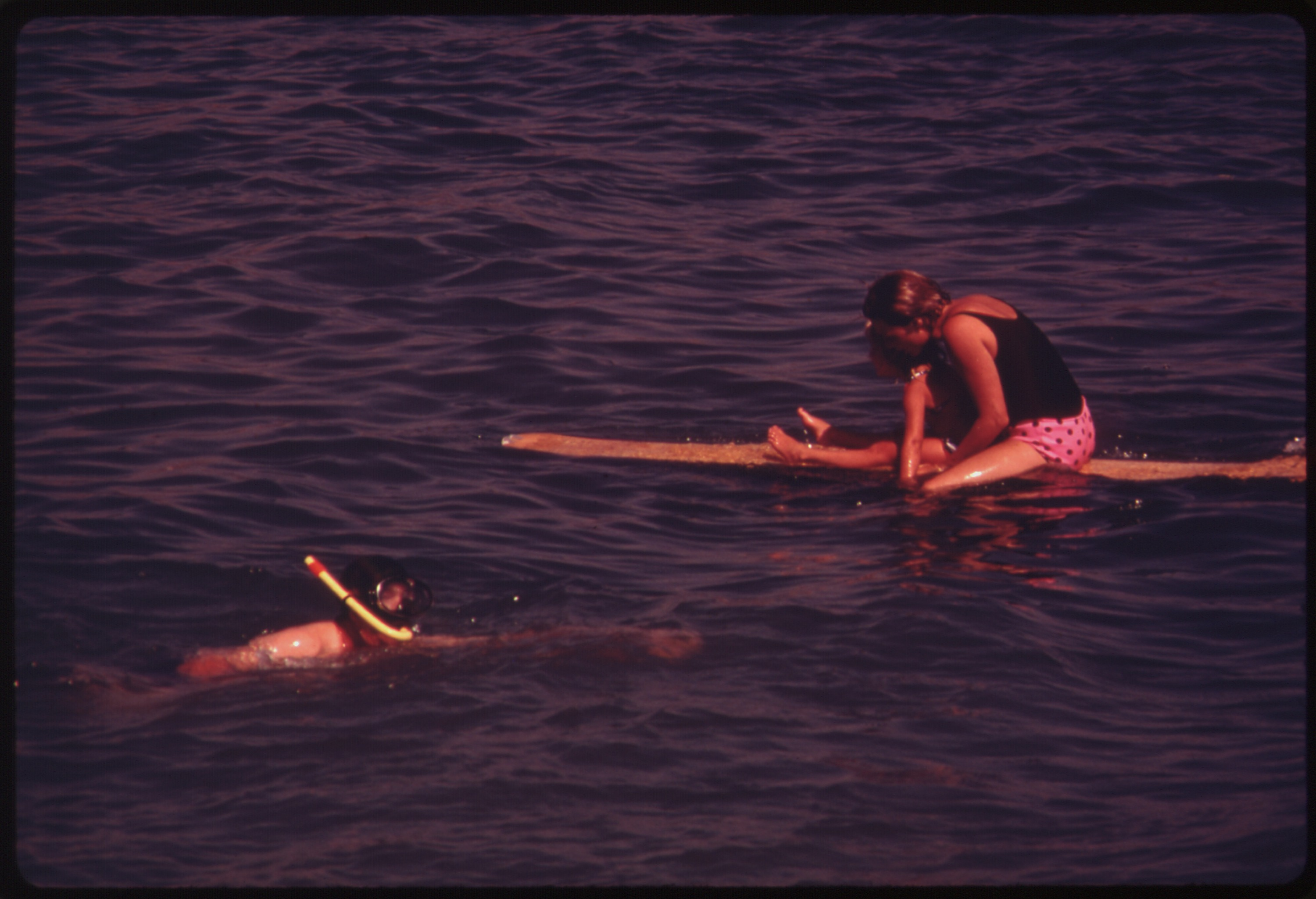
A snorkeler and surfer at the beach in September 1974

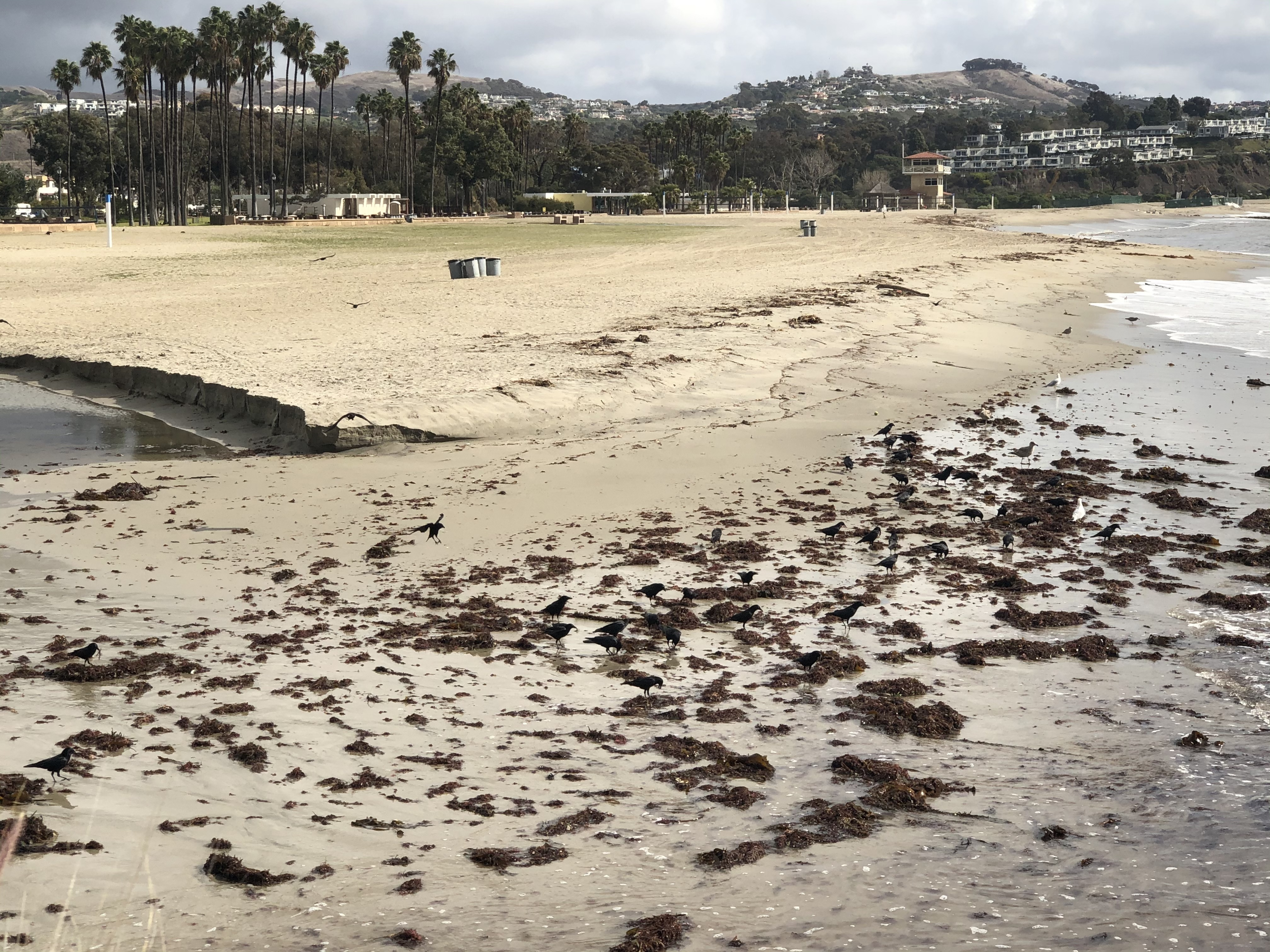
Various birds picking at seaweed at Doheny State Beach

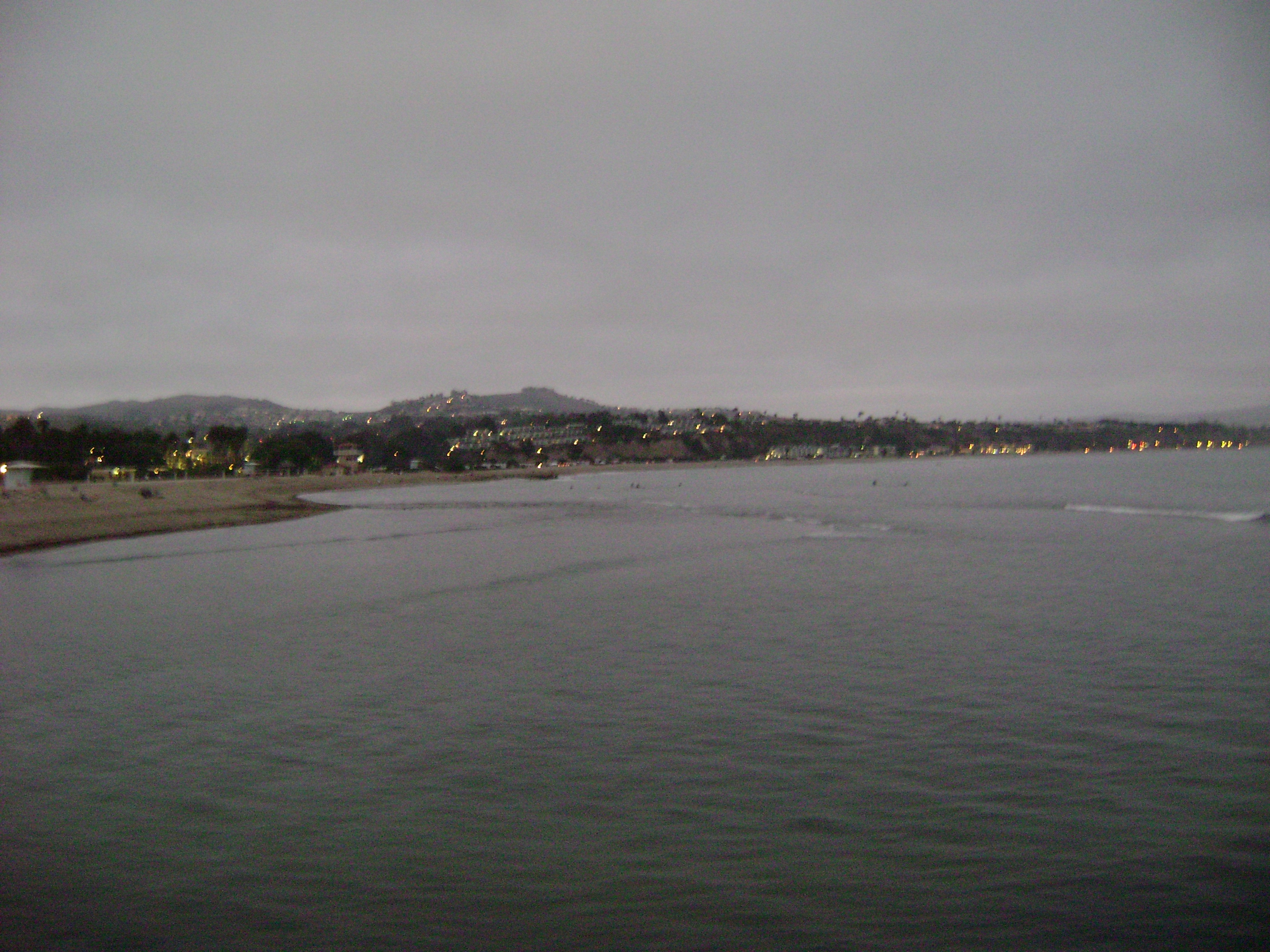
Doheny State Beach in September 2007

== See also ==
- List of beaches in California
- List of California state parks
  - List of California State Beaches
