= Eastern Municipal Water District of Southern California =

Regional water district formed in 1950

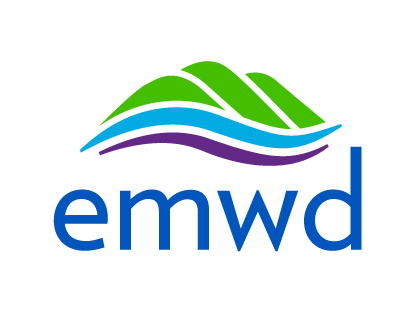
Logo of Eastern Municipal Water District

The Eastern Municipal Water District of Southern California is a regional water district formed in 1950 to secure additional water for a largely rural area of western Riverside County. In addition to water service, responsibilities include sewage collection, water desalination and water recycling.

EMWD also sells to eight other water agencies, which in turn, serve their own customers. They are Elsinore Valley MWD, Western MWD of Riverside County, Lake Hemet MWD, City of Perris, City of Hemet, Nuevo Water Company, City of San Jacinto, and Rancho California Water District.

The EMWD's Main Office and Operations and Maintenance Center are located at 2270 Trumble Road in Perris.

== History ==
Since its formation in 1950, Eastern Municipal Water District (EMWD) has changed from a small, primarily agricultural-serving agency, to one whose major demands come from domestic customers.

Authorized under the Municipal Water District Act of 1911, EMWD's duties and responsibilities are further delineated in the California Water Code. In 1951, EMWD annexed to the Metropolitan Water District of Southern California (MWD).

EMWD employs approximately 620 employees.

== Facilities ==
EMWD owns and operates more than 2,500 miles of potable water pipeline throughout its service area. EMWD has 79 potable (drinking) water storage tanks, 86 active pumping plants, 14 active domestic wells and 13 brackish (desalter) wells.

EMWD owns and operates potable (drinking) water filtration plants in Hemet and Perris. It has three reverse osmosis groundwater desalination facilities in Menifee.

EMWD also owns and operates four Regional Water Reclamation Facilities (RWRF) located in Perris, Moreno Valley, Temecula and San Jacinto. It treats 47 million US gallons of wastewater each day from more than 263,000 wastewater (sewer) connections. EMWD converts that wastewater to tertiary-treated recycled water, which is then used to irrigate landscapes for sports fields, medians, golf courses, parks, schools, restricted recreational use and more.

== Water supply sources ==
EMWD receives its water supplies from a mix of local and imported sources. Imported water is purchased through the Metropolitan Water District of Southern California, which includes the State Water Project and Colorado River Aqueduct as primary sources. As of June 30, 2018, imported water accounted for approximately 51 percent of EMWD's overall water supply portfolio.

EMWD also relies heavily on local groundwater from the San Jacinto Groundwater Basin. Ten percent of EMWD's overall demands are met through groundwater production and another five percent are met through groundwater desalination efforts. EMWD currently operates two groundwater desalination facilities in Menifee, which treats brackish (salty) groundwater through reverse osmosis.

Recycled water makes up about 34 percent of EMWD's overall water supply portfolio. This water is used for irrigation of crops, schools, parks, golf courses, streetscapes and industrial uses. EMWD uses 100 percent of its recycled water for beneficial reuse and is one of the nation's leaders in recycled water.

The district approved a plan in December 2023 to buy paper water rights from the proposed Doheny Desalination Plant which involves swapping rights on paper with the South Coast Water District in Laguna Beach. The desalinated water the district paid for would still get mixed into South Coast’s system, while imported water that would have gone to the South Coast would instead go to the district’s customers.

== EMWD Board of Directors ==
EMWD’s five-member board of directors comprise the governing body of EMWD. The EMWD Board of Directors are responsible to the members of the public of their respective division, and to the general public within the EMWD service area, for proper conduct of EMWD affairs.

Directors are elected to four-year terms by the registered voters in five geographic divisions. These divisions are apportioned by population. Terms are staggered to ensure continuity, with public elections held in at least two divisions every two years. Directors must reside within their elected division.

Terms are staggered to ensure continuity with public elections held in at least two divisions every two years.

The current Board of Directors is made up of Philip E. Paule (District 1); Stephen J. Corona (District 2); Randy A. Record (District 3); Jeff Armstrong (District 4); and David J. Slawson (District 5). Director Record sits on the Board for The Metropolitan Water District of Southern California (MWD).

== Service area ==
EMWD's 558-square-mile service area includes all or portions of the cities of Moreno Valley, Hemet, Perris, San Jacinto, Menifee, Perris, Murrieta, Temecula, and Canyon Lake. It also includes the unincorporated communities of Mead Valley, Good Hope, Romoland, Homeland, Winchester, French Valley, Valle Vista, and Diamond Valley. The population within the current 555-square-mile (1,440 km^{2}) service area is about 870,500.

EMWD provides service to about 159,000 domestic water accounts, 114 agricultural accounts, 263,000 wastewater accounts and 686 recycled water accounts. EMWD is California's sixth-largest retail water agency, serving roughly 34 percent of Riverside County's population.

== See also ==
- Water supply and sanitation in the United States
- Metropolitan Water District
