= Metropolitan Water District of Southern California =

Regional wholesaler of water in Southern California

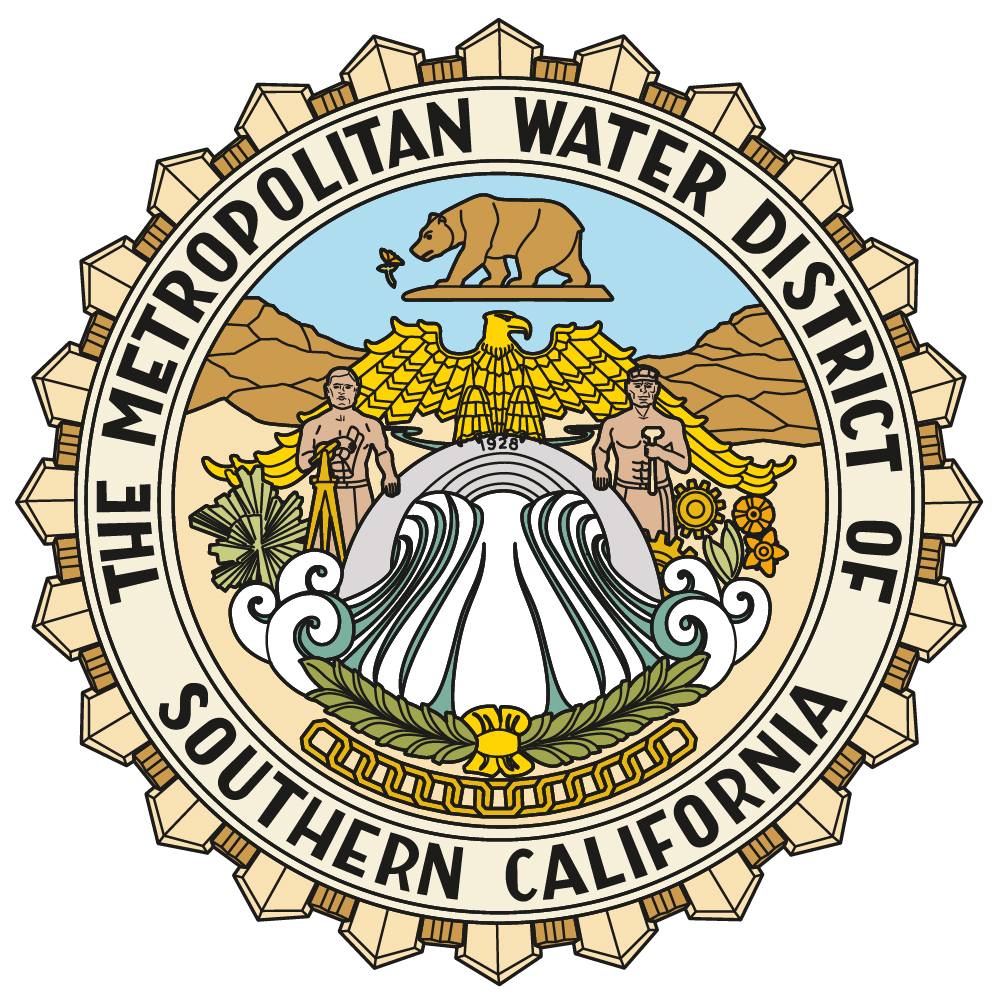

Water district overview
- Formed: 1928; 98 years ago
- Headquarters: 700 North Alameda Street, Los Angeles, California; 34°3′17″N 118°14′11″W
- Water district executive: Shivaji Deshmukh, General Manager
- Website: www.mwdh2o.com

The Metropolitan Water District of Southern California is a regional wholesaler and the largest supplier of treated water in the United States. The name is usually shortened to "Met," "Metropolitan," or "MWD." It is a cooperative of fourteen cities, eleven municipal water districts, and one county water authority, that provides water to 19 million people in a 5,200-square-mile (13,000 km^{2}) service area. It was created by an act of the California State Legislature in 1928, primarily to build and operate the Colorado River Aqueduct. Metropolitan became the first (and largest) contractor to the State Water Project in 1960.

Metropolitan owns and operates an extensive range of capital facilities including the Colorado River Aqueduct which runs from an intake at Lake Havasu on the California-Arizona border to its endpoint at the Lake Mathews reservoir in Riverside County. It also imports water supplies from northern California via the 444-mile (715 km) California Aqueduct as a contractor to the State Water Project. In 1960, Metropolitan became the first (and largest) contractor to the State Water Project. Metropolitan's extensive water system includes three major reservoirs, six smaller reservoirs, 830 miles (1,340 km) of large-scale pipes, about 400 connections to member agencies, 16 hydroelectric facilities and five water treatment plants.

It serves parts of Los Angeles, Orange, San Diego, Riverside, San Bernardino and Ventura counties. The district covers the coastal and most heavily populated portions of Southern California while large portions of San Diego, San Bernardino and Riverside counties are located outside of its service area.

The Metropolitan headquarters is in downtown Los Angeles, adjacent to Los Angeles Union Station.

== History ==
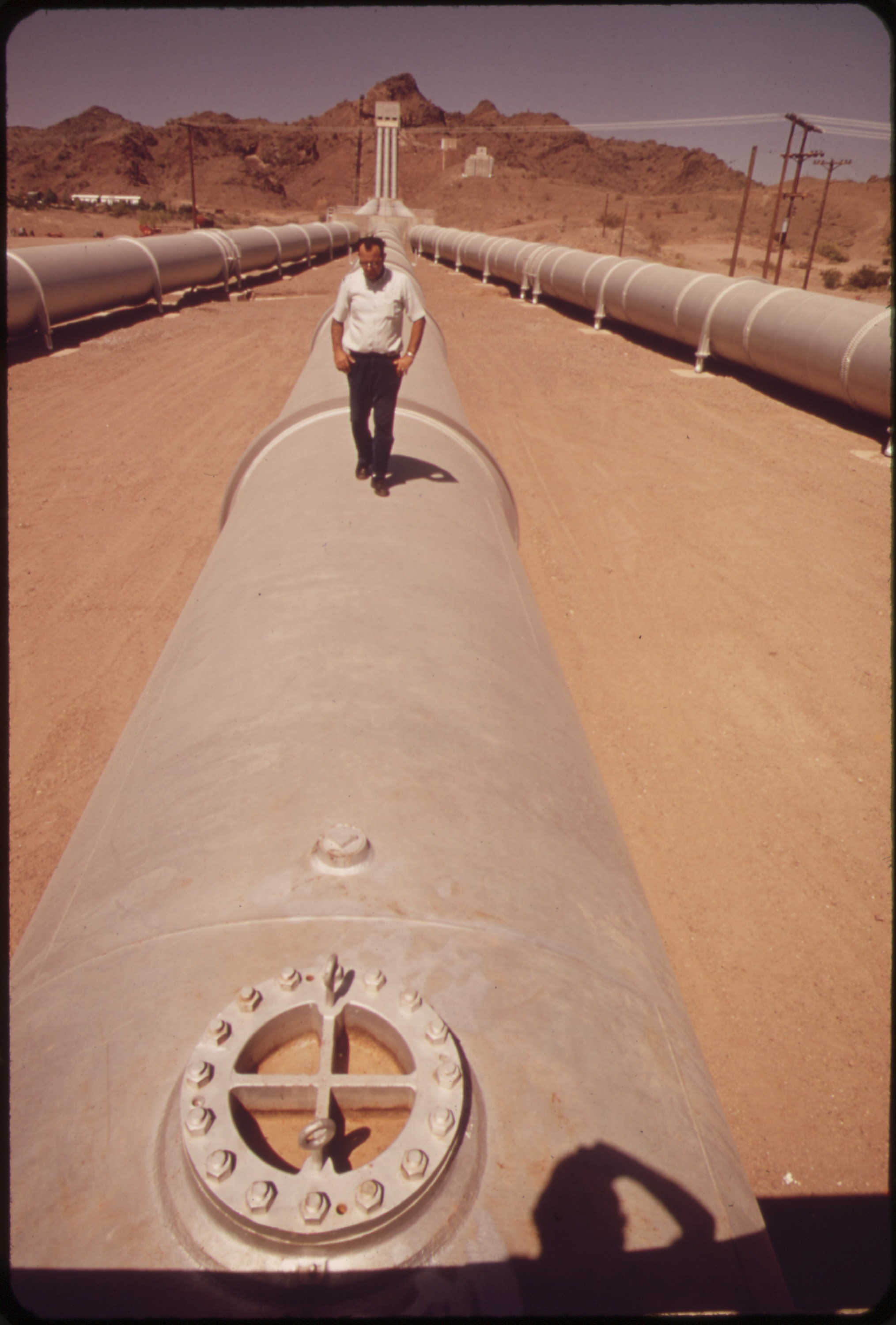
Drinking water pumping station near Parker Dam, 1972

In the early 20th century, Southern California cities were faced with a growing population and shrinking local groundwater supplies. The Metropolitan Water District of Southern California was established in 1928 under an act of the California Legislature to build and operate the 242-mile Colorado River Aqueduct (389 km) that would bring water to southern coastal areas. Southland residents voted for a major bond in the depths of the Great Depression to fund the construction effort through the desert to deliver essential water supplies and generate badly needed jobs.

The post-World War II boom and 1950s dry spells prompted a huge expansion of the Metropolitan service area as new cities began seeking additional reliable water supplies.

In 1960, Metropolitan, along with 30 other public agencies, signed a long-term contract that made possible the construction of the State Water Project, including reservoirs, pumping plants and the 444-mile California Aqueduct (715 km), which serves urban and agricultural agencies from the San Francisco Bay to Southern California. As the largest of the now 29 agencies, Metropolitan contracts with the state Department of Water Resources, which owns and operates the State Water Project, for slightly less than half of all supplies delivered to Metropolitan.

Metropolitan is governed by a board of 38 directors whose powers and functions are specified in the 1927 authorization act. This board was in charge of issuing bonds and financing their repayment by selling water to member agencies. In the early years, revenue from water sales was too low, so Metropolitan also collected taxes that ranged from 0.25 to 0.50 percent of assessed value. Ninety percent of the cost of the aqueduct has been paid for by the taxpayers. In 1929 the district was set up with an area of 600 square miles (1,600 km^{2}) and served a population of around 1,600,000 in 13 cities.

During the aqueduct's first five years of service from 1941 to 1946 it delivered an average of about 27,000 acre-feet (33,000,000 m^{3}) of water, using less than 2% of its capacity. Only one pump at each lift, operating from one to six months out of the year, was needed to meet all the demands made on the system. At this time, due to availability of ground water, less than 10% of the Colorado River Aqueduct's capacity was used, only 178,000 acre-feet (220,000,000 m^{3}) of water.

The San Diego County Water Authority joined Metropolitan as its first wholesale member agency in 1946. SDCWA was formed in 1944 to facilitate joining Metropolitan, received its first deliveries in 1947 and was buying half of Metropolitan's water by 1949. The SDCWA annexation broke two traditions at Metropolitan: Member agencies had previously been cities (SDCWA was a water wholesaler) in the south coast basin (SDCWA was south of the basin). The next break came in 1950, when Pomona MWD (now Three Valleys MWD) joined Metropolitan. Since Pomona was a largely agricultural member agency at the time, Metropolitan was no longer selling water only for domestic use. The territory served by the Pomona district has urbanized rapidly, with agriculture having disappeared almost entirely by 1970.

In 1952, Metropolitan began a $200 million program to bring the Colorado River Aqueduct to its full capacity of 1,212,000 acre-feet (1.495×10^{9} m^{3}) annually. The Colorado River Aqueduct added six pumps to the original three at each of its five pumping stations. CRA pumping expanded from about 16,500 acre-feet (20,400,000 m^{3}) of water in 1950 to about 1,029,000 acre-feet (1.269×10^{9} m^{3}) by 1960. On August 9, 1962, the Metropolitan set an all-time delivery record of 1,316,000,000 gallons of water in just a 24-hour period.

Metropolitan's additional supplies and easier rules of entry facilitated an expansion through annexation of large areas of low populations: The eight MWDs that joined from 1946 to 1955 added 200 percent to Metropolitan's service area but only 75 percent to Metropolitan's population served. By 1965, Metropolitan had 13 cities and 13 municipal water districts as members. It covered more than 4,500 square miles (12,000 km^{2}) and served some 10,000,000 people.

By 2008 Metropolitan had 14 cities and 12 municipal water districts (San Fernando joined in 1973; MWDOC and Coastal MWD merged in 2001) and provided water to nearly 10,000,000 people. As of 2021, Metropolitan with 26 member agencies and cities served nearly 19 million people in the counties of Los Angeles, Ventura, Orange, San Diego, Riverside, and San Bernardino.

=== Colorado River Drought Contingency Plan ===
In 2019 the Metropolitan Water District played a crucial role in the development of the Colorado River Drought Contingency Plan (DCP). The Drought Contingency Plan aims to implement legislation to reduce the risk of declining levels in the Colorado River reservoirs, particularly by incentivizing agencies to store additional water in Lake Powell and Lake Mead. In 2018, the Imperial Irrigation District elected to not execute the DCP and the Metropolitan Water District agreed to provide the full portion of water storage contributions to Lake Mead. By the end of 2020, MWD will have nearly stored 1 million acre-feet in Lake Mead and contributing to 12 feet (3.7 m) of Lake Mead's elevation.

== Water sources ==
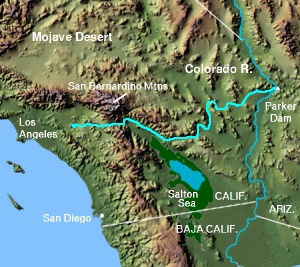
Colorado River Aqueduct

The State Water Project moves water from the western Sierra Nevada through the Sacramento–San Joaquin River Delta before delivering supplies—via the California Aqueduct to Southern California. Once in the south coastal plain, deliveries are split between the SWP's West Branch, storing water in Castaic Lake for delivery to the west side of the Los Angeles metropolitan area, and the East Branch, which delivers water to the Inland Empire and the south and east parts of the Los Angeles Basin.

The Colorado River Aqueduct begins at Lake Havasu, just north of Parker Dam, and travels 242 miles (389 km) west to Lake Mathews in southwest Riverside County. Water is first pumped 125 miles (201 km) uphill through a series of five pumping plants approaching Chiriaco Summit, then flows 117 miles (188 km) downhill towards Los Angeles.

Metropolitan contracts for about 2 MAF/Y (million acre feet per year) from the State Water Project and 1.35 MAF/Y from the Colorado River Aqueduct, but actual delivery amounts depend on a conditions including hydrology, infrastructure and regulatory conditions . Between 1984 and 2004 the actual deliveries were 0.7 MAF/Y from the SWP and 1.2 MAF/Y from the CRA. The SWP allotment is rarely met, if at all, due to restrictions on the amount of water that can be pumped from the Delta. A minimum freshwater flow has to pass through the Delta in order to prevent salinity intrusion from San Francisco Bay, and the removal of freshwater from the Delta has also threatened multiple species, such as native chinook salmon.

The Inland Feeder project added a direct tunnel and pipeline connection from Silverwood Lake to Diamond Valley Lake and was completed in 2010.

== Reservoirs ==
The Metropolitan Water District of Southern California reservoirs store fresh water for use in Los Angeles, Orange, Ventura, Riverside, San Bernardino, and San Diego counties. These reservoirs were built specifically to preserve water during times of drought, and are in place for emergencies uses such as earthquake, floods or other events.

Metropolitan maintains three major water reservoirs. One is Lake Mathews located in southwest Riverside, California, with a capacity of 182,000 acre-feet (224,000,000 m^{3}) of water. Another is Lake Skinner located south of Hemet in Riverside County, its capacity is 44,000 acre-feet (54,000,000 m^{3}) of water. Diamond Valley Lake is their third and newest reservoir, with a capacity of 810,000 acre-feet (1.00×10^{9} m^{3}) of water. This capacity is over twice as large as that of Castaic Lake, the next largest reservoir in Southern California maintained by the state Department of Water Resources.

Metropolitan partly funded the Brock Reservoir project with $28.6 million. In return for their contribution, California can each use 100,000 acre-feet (120,000,000 m^{3}) of water starting in 2016.

== Purification and treatment ==
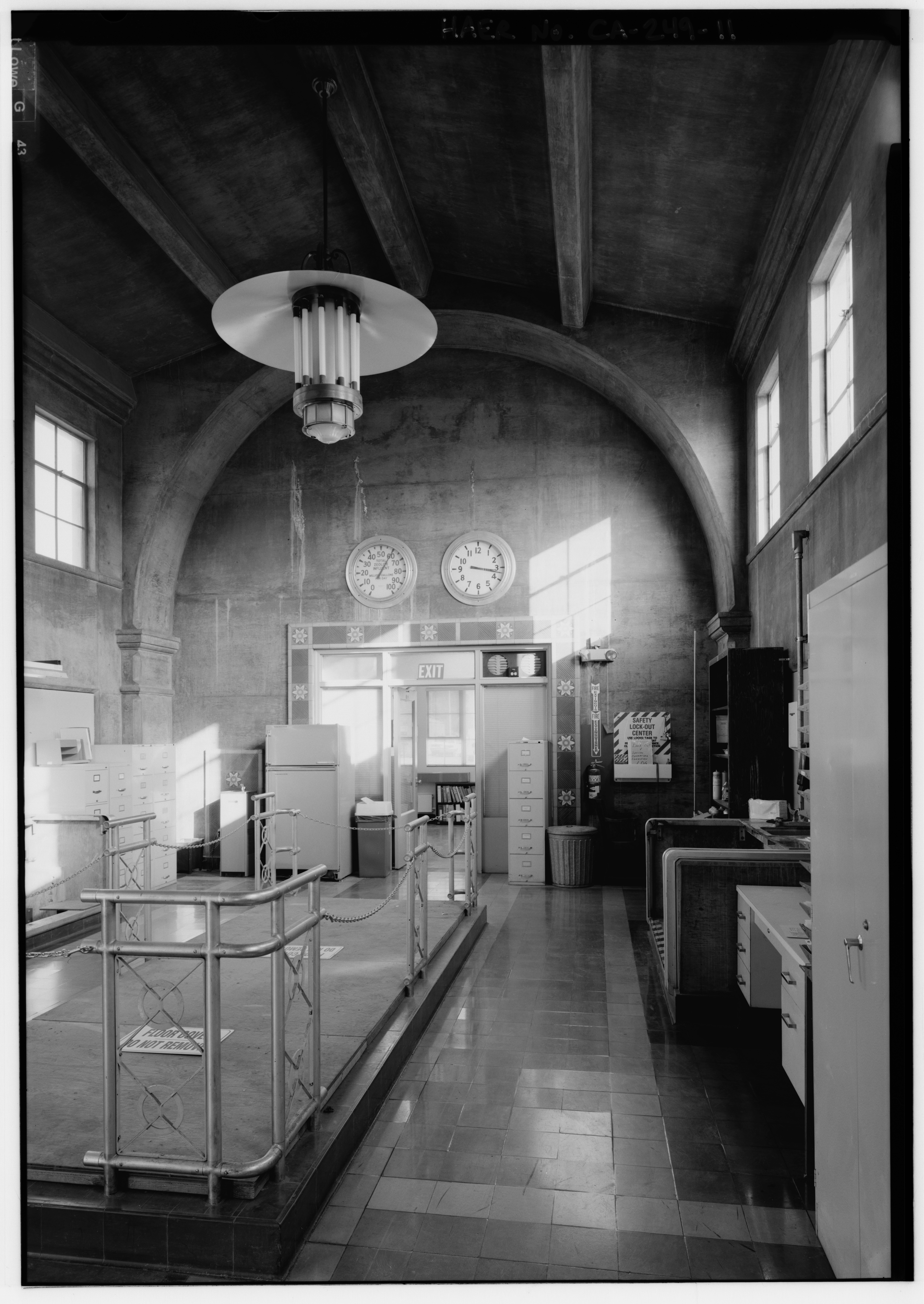
Interior of zeolite building at F. E. Weymouth plant

Metropolitan operates five treatment plants:

- Robert B. Diemer Treatment Plant in Yorba Linda began operation in 1963 and has a treatment capacity of 520 million gallons a day
- Joseph Jensen Treatment Plant in Granada Hills started operation in 1972 and is believed to be the largest treatment plant west of the Mississippi River with a treatment capacity of 750 million gallons a day
- Henry J. Mills Treatment Plant in Riverside became operational in 1978 and has a treatment capacity of 220 million gallons a day
- Robert A. Skinner Treatment Plant in Winchester started operation in 1976 and Metropolitan with a treatment capacity of 630 million gallons a day
- F. E. Weymouth Treatment Plant, a 58,800-square-foot (5,460 m^{2}) facility in La Verne began operation in 1941 and has a treatment capacity of 520 million gallons a day

They collectively filter water for more than 19 million Southern Californians. Metropolitan employs over 2,100 people to maintain and do research at these facilities, including scientists specializing in chemistry, microbiology, and limnology (the study of lakes and rivers).

Metropolitan's water treatment plants each use a conventional 5-step treatment process as follows:

1. Disinfection/Pre-Treatment: Water entering the plant is disinfected using ozone as the primary disinfectant. Chlorine is used as an ozone back-up disinfectant.
2. Coagulation: Chemical coagulants (either alum or ferric chloride and polymer) are injected into the water and mixed with flash jet mixers.
3. Flocculation: The water travels into the mixing and settling basins, where large mechanical mixers (flocculators) gently agitate the water. This further mixes the water with the coagulant chemicals and allows sufficient time for the larger suspended particles in the water to bind together and form “floc.”
4. Sedimentation: The floc particles, which are heavier than the surrounding water, settle to the bottom of the basin, forming a layer of material that is later removed.
5. Filtration: Settled water from the sedimentation basins is treated with a filter aid polymer and enters the filters, which consist of layers of anthracite coal and sand filter media. The filters remove virtually all of the suspended particles that did not settle during the sedimentation process.

Following the conventional treatment process, chlorine and ammonia are added to the water to form chloramines and maintain a disinfectant residual in the distribution system. Sodium hydroxide is added as a corrosion control measure to adjust the pH level and protect pipes and plumbing fixtures. Also, fluoride is added to help prevent dental caries in children as recommended by the U.S. Department of Health and Human Services.

Every year trained scientists and technicians perform more than 320,000 analytical tests on more than 50,000 samples. Metropolitan Water District has various EPA Environmental Protection Agency approved methods used to for the detection of bacteria, viruses, protozoan parasites, chemical contaminants and toxins.

== Proposed additional sources ==
=== Regional Recycled Water Program ===
In partnership with the Sanitation Districts of Los Angeles County and the Metropolitan Water District, The Regional Recycled Water Program will introduce purified and treated wastewater that will replenish groundwater basins across Los Angeles and Orange Counties that aims to potentially accommodate direct potable reuse demands in the near future. The program includes 60 miles (97 km) of new pipelines to convey the treated water across four regional groundwater basins, an industrial facility, and two MWD treatment plants.

The program calls for a water treatment facility that would be one of the largest in the nation, producing 150 million gallons per day or 168 thousand acre-feet per year of purified water. Before the full-scale facility is developed, a 0.5 million gallon per day demonstration facility, The Advanced Purification Center, in Carson will test, treat, and operate to ensure the highest quality standards of wastewater treatment are met prior to the development of the new facility. The construction and application of a membrane bioreactors in the demonstration facility cost nearly $17 million and the total cost of building the full-scale program will be $3.4 billion, resulting in an annual operation cost of $129 million, and water cost of $1,830 per acre-foot. The full scale treatment facility would serve 500,000 homes daily and deliver a purified source of water to the four regional groundwater basins: Central, West Coast, Main San Gabriel, and Orange County.

== Members ==
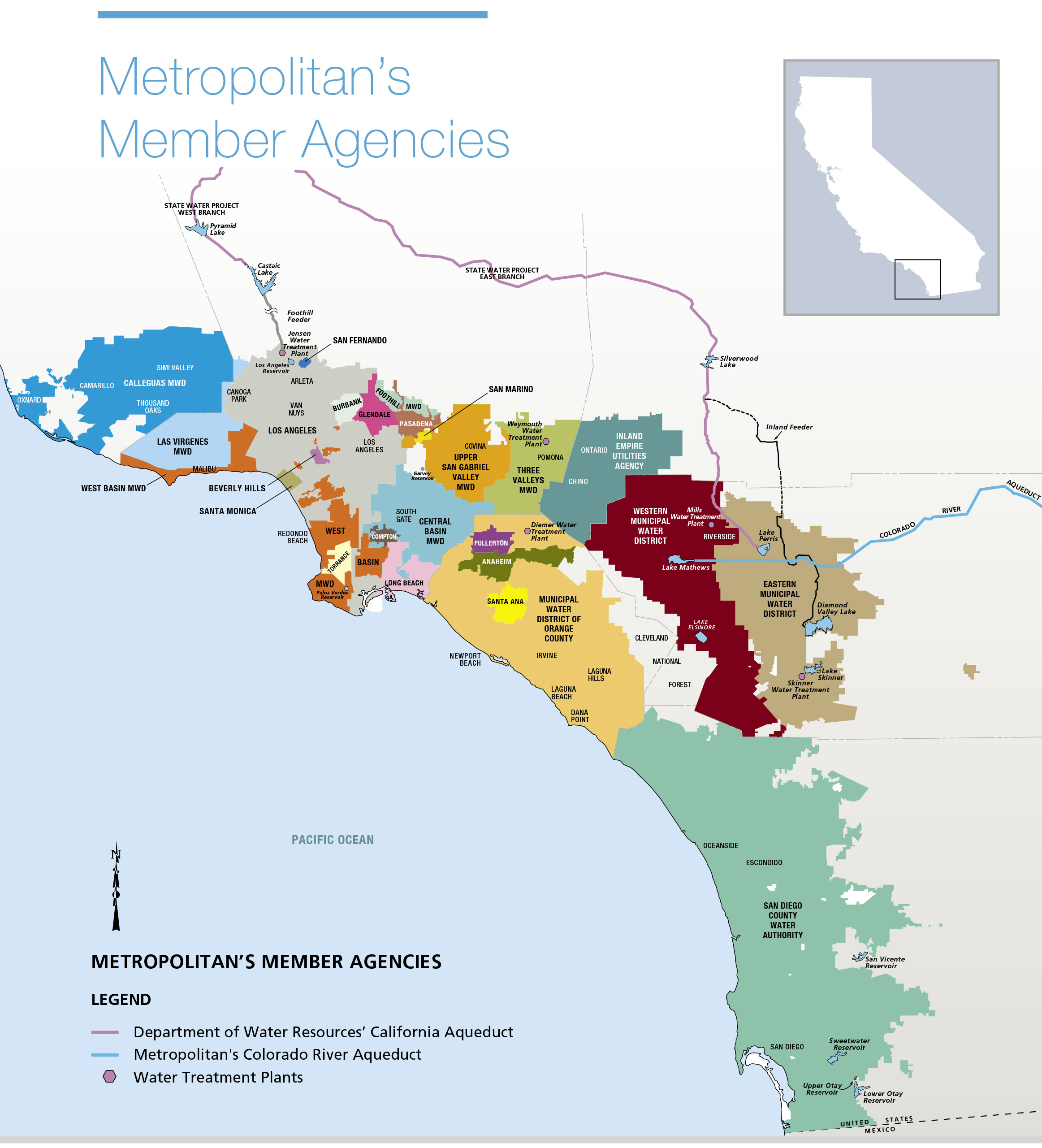

Metropolitan list of member agencies:

- City of Anaheim
- City of Beverly Hills
- City of Burbank
- City of Compton
- City of Fullerton
- City of Glendaleeas
- City of Long Beach
- City of Los Angeles
- City of Pasadena
- City of San Fernando
- City of San Marino
- City of Santa Ana
- City of Santa Monica
- City of Torrance
- Calleguas Municipal Water District
- Central Basin Municipal Water District
- Eastern Municipal Water District
- Foothill Municipal Water District
- Inland Empire Utilities Agency (IEUA)
- Las Virgenes Municipal Water District
- Municipal Water District of Orange County
- San Diego County Water Authority
- Three Valleys Municipal Water District
- Upper San Gabriel Valley Municipal Water District
- West Basin Municipal Water District
- Western Municipal Water District of Riverside County

== See also ==
- Water supply and sanitation in the United States
- United States Environmental Protection Agency
- Colorado River Aqueduct
- Los Angeles Department of Water and Power
- Southern California World Water Forum
