= Doheny Desalination Plant =

Proposed desalination plant in California

- Interactive map of Doheny Desalination Plant
- Location: Dana Point, California, US
- Coordinates: 33°27′58″N 117°40′52″W

The Doheny Desalination Plant is a 5-million-US-gallon per day (19 Ml) facility proposed by South Coast Water District in Dana Point, California. The 30-acre site (12 ha) is just north of State Route 1 on east side of San Juan Creek with access off Stonehill Drive.

== Description ==
The Joint Regional Water Supply System will distribute desalinated water existing water transmission lines to South Coast Water District customers and south Orange County. Eastern Municipal Water District (EMWD), in Riverside County, approved a plan to buy paper water rights which involves the two agencies swapping rights on paper. The desalinated water EMWD paid for would still get mixed into South Coast’s system, while imported water that would have gone to the South Coast would instead go to EMWD’s customers.

The subsurface intake (slant) wells at Doheny State Beach will be fully buried beneath the ocean floor to protect marine life. Brine, the saltwater left over from the desalination process, would be co-mingled with treated wastewater in an existing outfall pipe 2 miles (3.2 km) offshore. Operating costs for the first year are estimated to be $11 million.
