= Western Science Center =

Museum in Hemet, California, United States

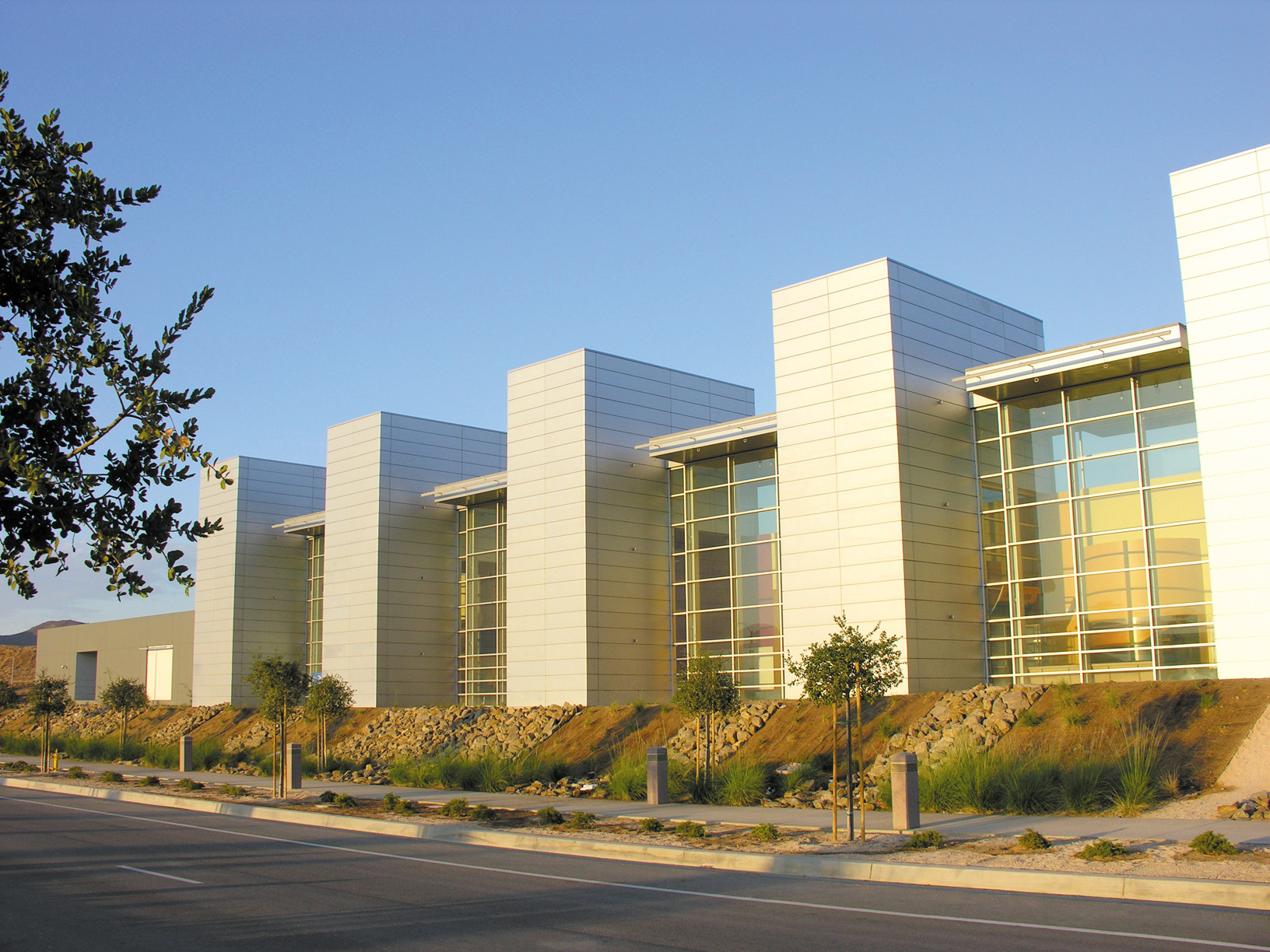
- The Western Center Museum campus.
- Former name: Western Center for Archaeology & Paleontology
- Established: 2006
- Location: 2345 Searl Parkway; Hemet, CA 92543
- Coordinates: 33°42′19″N 116°59′35″W
- Director: Alton Dooley
- Website: http://www.westerncentermuseum.org/
- Opening hours: Tuesday - Sunday, 10am – 5pm

The Western Science Center (WSC), formerly the Western Center for Archaeology & Paleontology, is a museum located near Diamond Valley Lake in Hemet, California. The WSC is home to a large collection of Native American artifacts and Ice Age fossils that were unearthed at Diamond Valley Lake, including "Max", the largest mastodon found in the western United States, and "Xena", a Columbian mammoth, as well as dinosaur fossils recovered from New Mexico.

Opened in 2006, the museum has been designed to provide world-class facilities for the research, curation, and presentation of the nearly one million specimens discovered during the development of Diamond Valley Lake in Hemet.

== The Campus ==
The 33,000 square feet (3,100 m^{2}) building was designed to be among the most eco-friendly museums in the United States. Its special environmental features include solar panels on the roof, cold-water pipelines running underneath the floor to reduce air conditioning, landscaping with low-irrigation native foliage, and extensive water reclamation. In 2008, it was awarded LEED Platinum Status by the US Green Building Council, their highest rating, and was the first museum in the United States to receive the recognition.

The museum's public displays are housed in the permanent gallery, with another gallery housing temporary and traveling exhibits. The collections are held in the repository, not open to the public, which features 14-foot-tall (4.3 m), fully motorized compactor shelving units. The Collections Repository holds many paleontological and archaeological collections of Riverside County projects.

== Exhibits ==
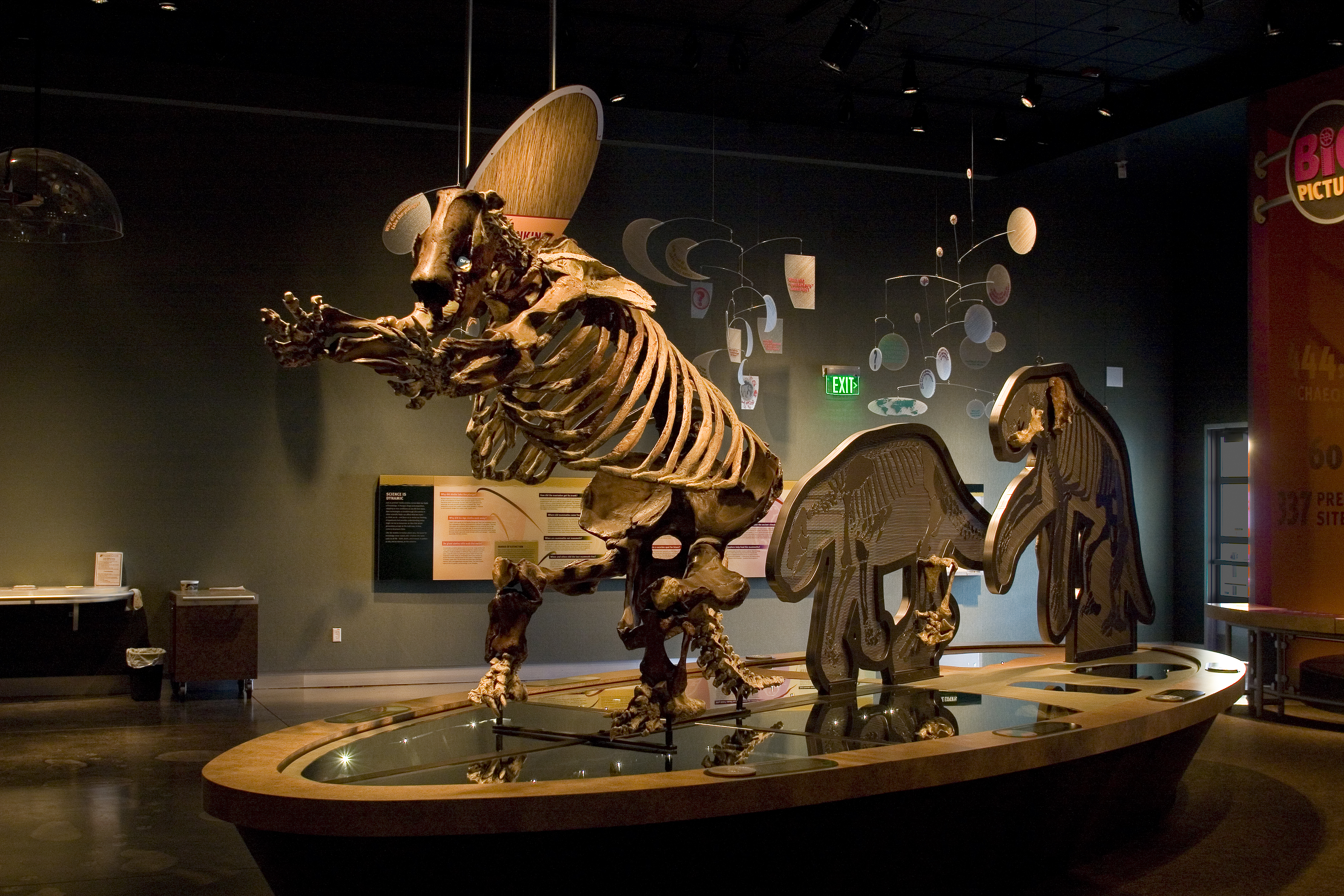
Harlan's ground sloth at WSC

The museum features a 156 feet (48 m) long exterior walkway that holds a life-on-Earth timeline. The welcome lobby features 24 feet (7.3 m) high walls with re-created paleontological strata and reproduction fossils projecting from the walls.

The tour of the permanent gallery begins with interactive exhibits on the natural history of Domenigoni and Diamond Valleys, continuing through displays on European and Native American culture and history from the area. Among the artifacts on display are pieces donated by the Domenigoni family, the original settlers of the valley, and the Soboba band of Luiseño Indians that inhabited the area before them.

Visitors can view two movies on the construction of Diamond Valley Lake, and the fauna of the Pleistocene in the Diamond and Domenigoni Valleys, shown in a 270 degree immersive theater that shakes with the movies. From there, visitors proceed to the paleontology gallery, replete with fossils recovered and studied by scientists from the San Bernardino County Museum. The highlights of this gallery are the skeletons of "Max", the largest mastodon ever discovered in the western United States, and "Xena", a Columbian mammoth. Also featured in the gallery is "Li'l Stevie", one of the most complete mastodons known from the western United States, who is displayed unreconstructed and still partially buried as found when it was first uncovered. The gallery also features the skeletons of a Harlan's ground sloth, and interactive displays on the disciplines of archaeology and paleontology. Visitors can also visit temporary traveling exhibits in the 3,000 square feet (280 m^{2}) temporary exhibit area.

On August 21, 2021, the museum opened the new gallery, Prehistory Pathways, which focuses on fossils found in New Mexico's Menefee Formation and the museum's research there. Included is the hadrosaur Ornatops, whose holotype is at the science centre, as well as artwork and models by the noted Brian Engh.

The museum also features a full-scale simulated archaeology and paleontology dig site, which opened for its first student excavations in the spring of 2009. It is currently being used by WSC staff, in association with local K-12 schools and colleges, to teach proper excavation methodology to students. It is also open for museum visitors to view an active dig site in process.

== Affiliations ==
In November 2008 the Smithsonian Institution granted Affiliate status to WSC.
