= Domenigoni Mountains =

Mountain range in California

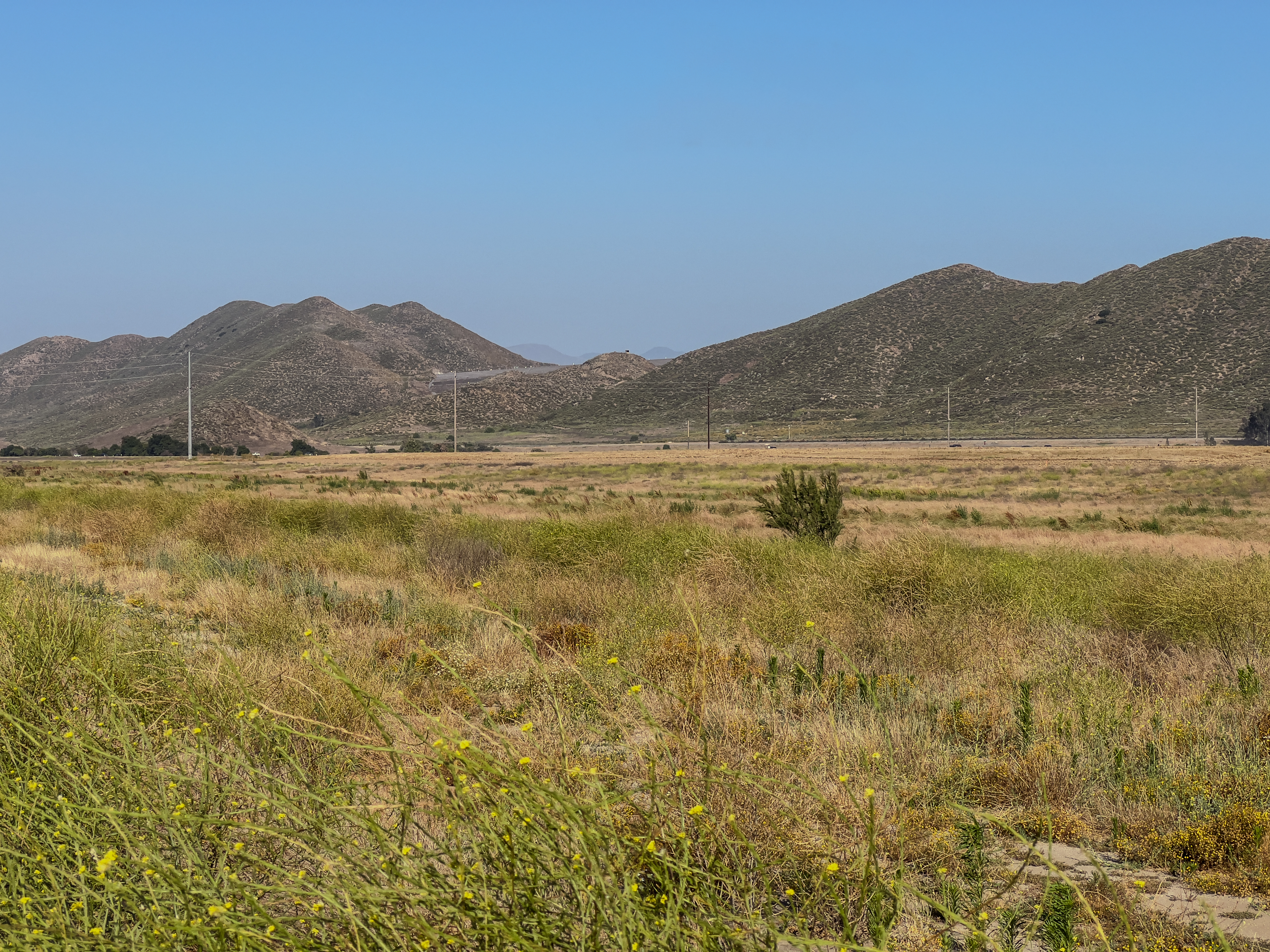
- A view of the Domenigoni Mountains from Winchester, California

Highest point
- Elevation: 631 m (2,070 ft)

Geography
- Location within California
- Country: United States
- State: California
- District: Riverside County
- Range coordinates: 33°41′43.080″N 117°1′52.095″W
- Topo map: USGS Winchester

The Domenigoni Mountains are a mountain range in Riverside County, California. They lie north of the Menifee Valley and south of the Perris Valley and San Jacinto Valley, west and north of Diamond Valley and north of Domenigoni Valley. The Domenigoni Mountains are composed primarily of metamorphic rock of the Triassic - Jurassic French Valley formation within Searls Ridge and the 1967 foot summit across the saddle to the west of it. The extreme eastern end of Searls Ridge and the western extreme of the 1967 foot summit of the range are Cretaceous granitic rock. The range and valley are named for Italian-American landowner Angelo Domenigoni, who purchased the land in 1879.

Searls Ridge and the 1967 foot summit of the Domenigoni Mountains across a saddle to the west of it, enclose Diamond Valley Lake on its northern shore together with the Rawson Mountains on its southern shore. Domenigoni Valley and Diamond Valley lie between them, and with the dams these mountains contain the reservoir. The dams were built within the rock of the French Valley formation in both ranges.
