= Inland Feeder =

- Begins: Silverwood Lake; 34°18′14″N 117°19′05″W
- Ends: Diamond Valley Lake; 33°40′57″N 117°02′03″W
- Maintained by: Metropolitan Water District of Southern California

Characteristics
- Total length: 44 mi (71 km)
- Capacity: 1,000 cu ft/s (28 m^{3}/s)

History
- Construction start: 1997
- Opened: 2010

The Inland Feeder is a 44 mi (71 km) high capacity water conveyance system that connects the California State Water Project to the Colorado River Aqueduct and Diamond Valley Lake. The Metropolitan Water District of Southern California designed the system to increase Southern California's water supply reliability in the face of future weather pattern uncertainties, while minimizing the impact on the San Francisco Bay/Sacramento–San Joaquin River Delta environment in Northern California. The feeder takes advantage of large volumes of water when available from Northern California, depositing it in surface storage reservoirs, such as Diamond Valley Lake, and local groundwater basins for use during dry periods and emergencies. This improves the quality of Southern California drinking water by allowing more uniform blending of better quality water from the state project with Colorado River supplies, which has a higher mineral content.

The feeder system includes three large tunnels, two running through the San Bernardino Mountains and one running under the Riverside Badlands between Redlands and Moreno Valley. Construction began in 1997 and water began flowing through the system in mid-2010. As of 2010, it is the only source of water for Diamond Valley Lake.

== Geography ==
The feeder begins at the Devil Canyon afterbay in the foothills of San Bernardino, where water is received from Silverwood Lake, and makes its way through the Arrowhead West and Arrowhead East tunnels into Highland. From there the Highland pipeline and Mentone pipeline carry water to Redlands and the northern end of the Riverside Badlands Tunnel. The Riverside Badlands Tunnel runs south into Moreno Valley, where a series of pipelines carries and deposits water into Diamond Valley Lake near Hemet.

== Construction ==
Construction of the Inland Feeder began in 1997 with the excavation of the Riverside Badlands Tunnel followed by the excavation of the two Arrowhead tunnels. Water began flowing through the system in mid-2010. Construction of the tunnels was such a large project that it was featured in the television shows Modern Marvels and Tactical to Practical on the History Channel, and Discovery Channel’s Build It Bigger. Because of the challenges faced during construction of the tunnels, the project received the 2010 E3 Environmental Sustainability Honor Award by the American Academy of Environmental Engineers and Scientists.

=== Arrowhead West Tunnel ===
The Arrowhead West Tunnel is 3.8 mi (6.1 km) long and 12 ft (3.7 m) in diameter. The tunnel begins at Devil's Canyon and is the first of the three tunnels in the feeder project. It continues east to the Waterman portal at Old Waterman Canyon Road and California State Route 18. The tunnel was constructed with a grade to allow water to flow by gravity; from the time the water enters the Devil Canyon Portal until it exits the Waterman Portal, the tunnel will have dropped about 31 feet in elevation.

The west tunnel was the most difficult of the three tunnels to excavate. It was excavated using a tunnel boring machine (TBM) that took over four years to bore its way through the mountain. The TBM was launched from the Waterman Portal and tunneled in a westerly direction toward the Devil Canyon portal at a slight uphill gradient of approximately 2 inches per 100 linear feet (0.17%). Crews faced many challenges during the excavation, including the 2003 Old Fire that destroyed construction equipment at the Waterman Portal and halted tunneling for ten days. Later that year, a flash flood engulfed the Waterman Portal site and submerged the TBM. It took four months to restore operations in the aftermath of the flooding.

The TBM faced many challenges during the tunneling. Much of the tunneling took place in water-bearing strata of metamorphic and granitic rock. The presence of water, coupled with the depth of the tunnel, up to 1,100 feet underground, forced the tunneling team to deal with water pressures in excess of 150 pounds per square inch. Additionally, the tunnel alignment crossed or traversed near several significant faults and shear zones, including branches of the San Andreas and Arrowhead Springs Faults. In these faulted areas, the massive blocks of rock were broken into fine debris that were treated with grout before tunneling could safely cross through these zones. A particularly challenging reach of the tunnel alignment was encountered in the last 1,500 feet of the tunneling work as the TBM crossed five significant fault and shear zones along the tunnel alignment on its way to completion at the Devil Canyon Portal. While tunneling in this zone in mid-2008, the TBM began dipping as it encountered a 40-foot-wide fault zone of completely crushed, weak rock. Concrete and steel foundation pads were constructed in front of the cutter head to stabilize the TBM and correct the alignment of the machine as it crossed the weak ground within the fault zone. The tunnel was completed in August 2008, with installation of pipeline being completed in 2009.

=== Arrowhead East Tunnel ===
The Arrowhead East Tunnel is 5.8 mi (9.3 km) long and 12 ft (3.7 m) in diameter and runs under McKinley Mountain. It begins at the Strawberry Portal in Strawberry Canyon near California State Route 18 and continues east to the City Creek Portal near California State Route 330. The East tunnel was also constructed at a slight downhill grade to allow water to flow by gravity; from the time the water enters the Strawberry Portal until it exits the City Creek Portal, the tunnel will have dropped about 55 feet in elevation.

The tunnel was constructed in two segments. Original construction commenced in early 1997 at the City Creek Portal, and mining progressed along an uphill gradient from east to west. After two years of mining effort, and more than 8,000 feet into the tunnel alignment, groundwater flows into the excavated tunnel began to steadily increase. Following extensive consultation with the United States Forest Service, MWD decided to halt mining on the east tunnel and install the final 12-foot diameter pipe liner in the excavated portion of the tunnel. MWD and the Forest Service worked to determine how best to complete the remaining 22,458 feet of the tunnel. This collaboration resulted in significant revisions to the original design, revisions that would ultimately allow the tunneling effort to meet the strict groundwater inflow requirements of the Forest Service Special Use Permit. The tunnel was redesigned to use bolted and gasketed precast concrete tunnel segments. Not only were these segments designed to provide structural support to the mined tunnel, but they also were capable of delivering a nearly watertight environment inside the tunnel to dramatically limit the amount of groundwater inflow during the mining operations. Construction resumed from the Strawberry portal, working toward the original City Creek Portal construction.

The tunnel was constructed using a TBM, originating from the Strawberry Portal and mining at a slight downhill gradient of approximately 18 feet per 100 linear feet (0.25%). Much like the West Tunnel, the TBM in the east tunnel encountered water-bearing strata of metamorphic and granitic rock. The presence of water, coupled with the depth of the tunnel below the surface, up to 2,100 feet underground, forced the tunneling team to deal with water pressures in the tunnel heading in excess of 200 pounds per square inch. Also, much like the West tunnel mining efforts, the TBM had to traverse branches of the San Andreas fault, and on one occasion in late 2006, the TBM became stuck as mining efforts approached some particularly difficult ground. Hand-mining efforts above the TBM shield were eventually employed to free the stuck machine. The tunnel was completed in May 2008 with the installation of pipeline being completed in 2009.

=== Riverside Badlands Tunnel ===
The $119 million Riverside Badlands Tunnel is 8 mi (13 km) long, the longest tunnel in the feeder project, with a diameter of 12 ft (3.7 m) and runs from Redlands, underneath the Crafton Hills and San Timoteo Badlands through to Moreno Valley. The tunnel ranges in depth from 50 to 850 feet and contains 1,500 feet (460 m) of pipeline. It has two primary portals; the Gilman portal in Moreno Valley and the Opal portal in Redlands, each with permanent concrete structures. Along with the two portals are two access-ventilation shafts: one along San Timoteo Canyon road and another along Live Oak Canyon road. The tunnel was finished in 2003, a year ahead of schedule.

Construction of the tunnel began in October 1998 with the excavation of the Gilman Portal and dewatering work at the two intermediate shafts. Tunnel excavation was carried out from November 1999 through July 2001 using a shielded TBM. Construction of the tunnel included many challenges. The TBM had to bore its way through diverse ground conditions consisting of weak sedimentary rocks; strong, fractured metamorphic rocks; and alluvium, all of which were below the groundwater table. Special measures such as probing and grouting ahead of the TBM and, in particular, deep dewatering wells, were demonstrated to be effective for controlling adverse ground conditions. The project also showed the advantage of working from a portal. The Gilman Portal site proved to be ideal, supporting very efficient mining and muck disposal operations and also allowing long pipe sections to be installed in the tunnel, significantly reducing the amount of field welding required.

== Notes ==
This article incorporates text from publications of the Metropolitan Water District of Southern California, which is in the public domain.
