= Inland Empire Utilities Agency =

American regional wastewater facility in California

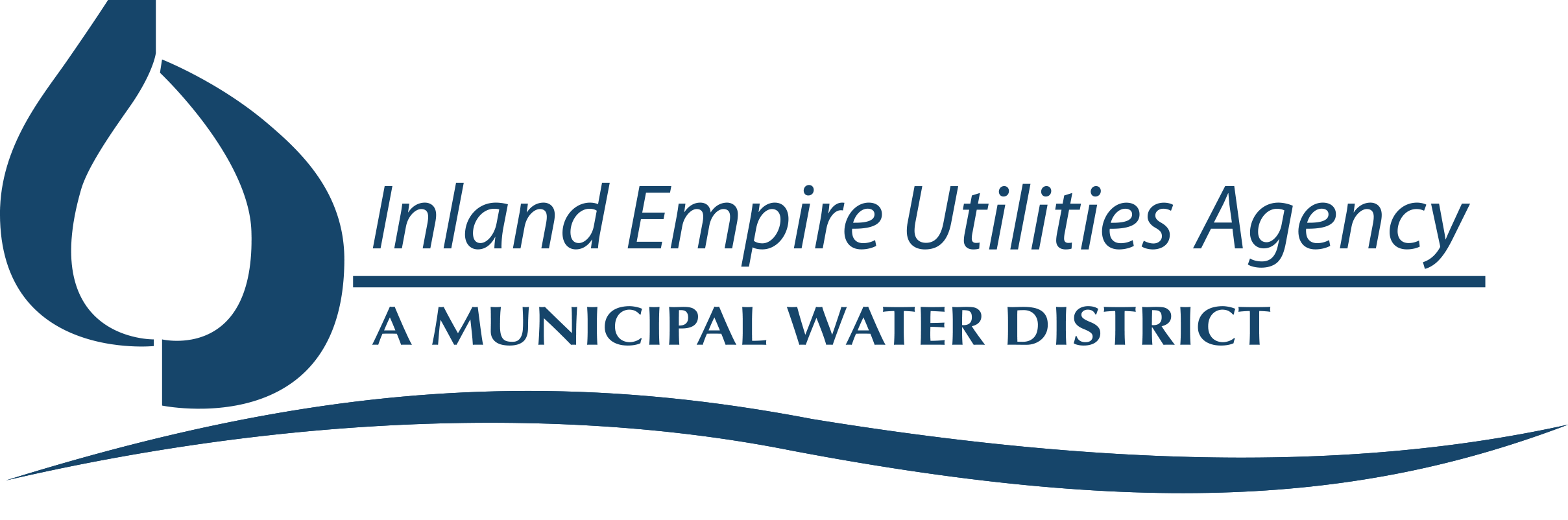
- Logo of IEUA

Agency overview
- Formed: 1950 Chino Basin Municipal Water District (CBMWD); 1998 Name changed to: Inland Empire Utilities Agency (IEUA)
- Jurisdiction: Special District
- Headquarters: 6075 Kimball Ave., Chino, CA 91708
- Agency executive: Kevin Alexander, General Manager
- Website: ieua.org

The Inland Empire Utilities Agency (IEUA) is a regional wastewater facility and wholesale supplemental water supplier in southwestern San Bernardino County, in the Inland Empire region of Southern California.

== Services ==
IEUA specifically provides water services to seven cities in the Pomona Valley: Chino, Chino Hills, Fontana, Montclair, Ontario, Rancho Cucamonga, and Upland. The Agency's service area covers 242 square miles and approximately 700,000 people.

IEUA's supplemental water comes from both imported water and recycled water.

The wastewater treatment facility consists of domestic and industrial disposal systems and energy recovery and production facilities. The agency is also a biosolids and fertilizer treatment provider and remains a leader in protecting the quality of the area's groundwater.

== History ==
IEUA was formed in 1950 as the Chino Basin Municipal Water District (CBMWD) and joined MWD in the same year. In 1998 CBMWD changed its name to the Inland Empire Utilities Agency (IEUA). The name change was meant to reflect changes in the District's mission.

In 2002 IEUA made history by becoming the first public agency to obtain a Platinum LEED rating by the USGBC

== Chino Creek Wetlands and Educational Park ==
In 2008 the Chino Creek Wetlands and Educational Park opened to the public. The park is located at the IEUA headquarters adjacent to the LEED Platinum buildings. Among many other things, the park features:

- 1.7 miles of trails
- 22 acres of habitat
- 6 connecting wetland ponds used for tertiary treatment of grey water before it is sent out to the Chino Creek
- One million gallons of recycled water flowing through its wetlands each day
- Wildlife monitoring stations
