= Southern California World Water Forum =

The Southern California World Water Forum—SoCal WWF promotes regional water-use efficiency and conservation in addition to sustainable potable water and sanitation projects for developing world communities. The Forum is an educational and small grants program designed to provide information, and to reward innovative projects and proposals from colleges and universities in Southern California.

== Purpose ==
Synopsis from the U.S. Department of Interior, United States Bureau of Reclamation:

"The purpose of the Southern California World Water Forum program is to underscore the importance of water quality and conservation issues. The Metropolitan Water District of Southern California—MWD, along with other partners, will establish a grant competition for community colleges and universities. Grants will be offered for research and development on the implementation of water-use efficient concepts or technology that can be cost-effectively implemented in water-stressed regions, locally or internationally."

== Partners ==
The Southern California World Water Forum is a unique partnership of major utility companies, government agencies, and NGOs (non-governmental organizations). Principal partners are the United States Bureau of Reclamation, Metropolitan Water District of Southern California, Los Angeles County Sanitation, and Friends of the United Nations. Other sponsoring NGO participants have included American Society of Civil Engineers, U.S. Water and Power, and Water For People.

== College and University Participation ==
Over 40 different colleges, community colleges, and universities have participated, with many receiving grants of $10,000 to develop innovative water and sanitation projects.
SoCal WWF participants include:

- University of California campuses: UCLA, UC Irvine, UC Riverside, and UC San Diego.
- University of Southern California
- Loyola Marymount University
- California State Universities: in CSU Long Beach, CSU Los Angeles, Cal Poly Pomona, CSU San Diego, and CSU San Bernardino.
- Santa Monica College
- Art Center College of Design

== See also ==
- Index—Water conservation
- Index—Water development and sustainability
- Index—Water and the environment
