= Diamond Valley Lake =

Reservoir in Riverside County, California, United States

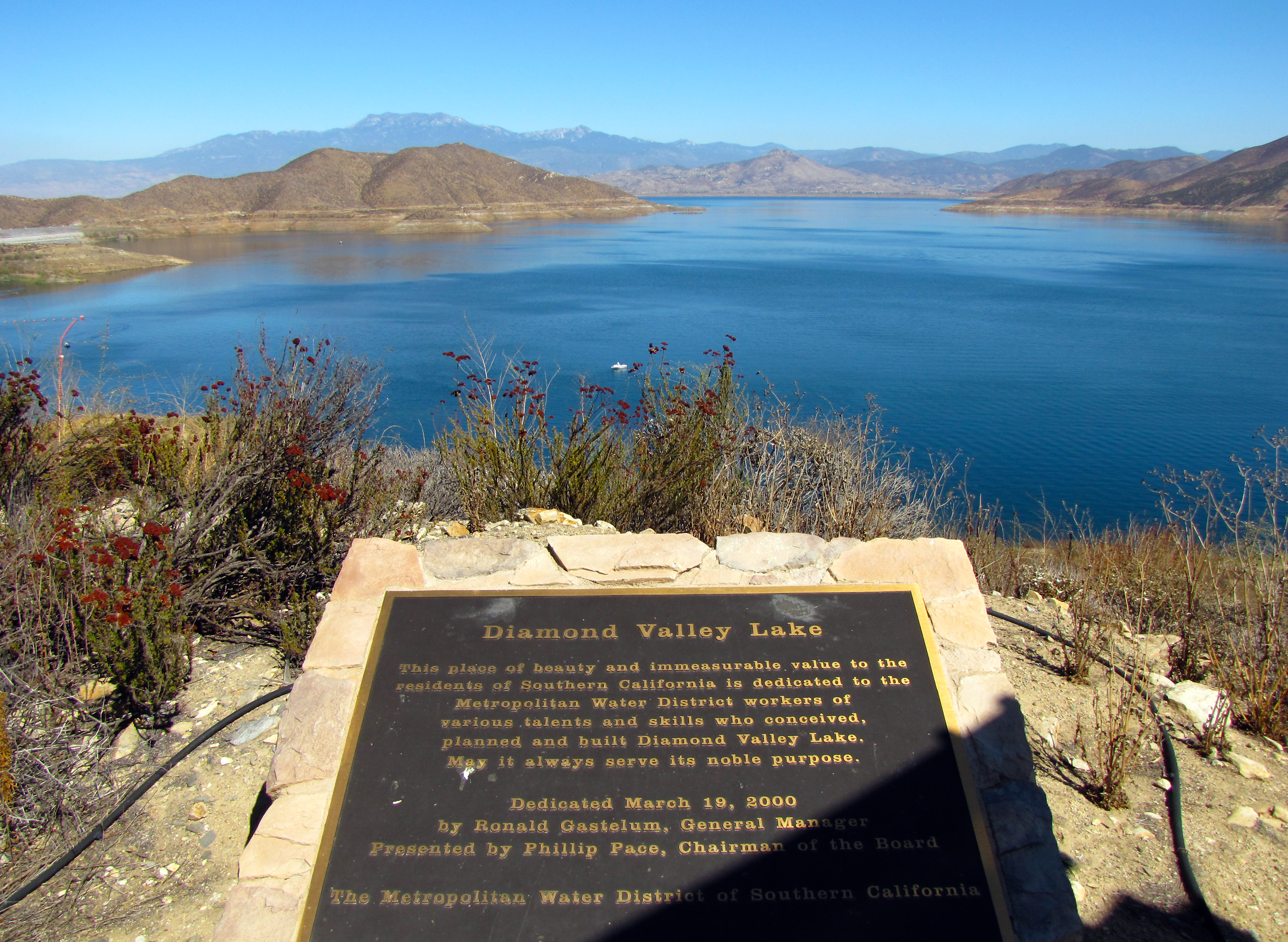

- Location within California
- Location: Riverside County, California, United States
- Coordinates: 33°40′42″N 117°02′30″W
- Lake type: Reservoir
- Basin countries: United States
- Max. length: 4.5 m (15 ft)
- Max. width: 2 m (6 ft 7 in)
- Surface area: 4,500 acres (1,800 ha)
- Max. depth: 260 ft (79 m)

Diamond Valley Lake is a man-made off-stream reservoir located near Hemet, California, United States. It is one of the largest reservoirs in Southern California and one of the newest. It has a capacity of 800,000 acre-feet (990,000,000 m^{3}). In terms of surface area, it is the largest lake wholly within Riverside County and the Inland Empire, but it is smaller than the Salton Sea. The lake nearly doubled the area's surface water storage capacity and provides additional water supplies for drought, peak summer, and emergency needs.

The Metropolitan Water District of Southern California (MWD) began the $1.9 billion construction project in 1995. Filling of the lake, by way of the Colorado River Aqueduct, began in 1999 (27 years ago) and was completed in 2003 (23 years ago). The lake is served by the Inland Feeder.

The lake features three earth fill dams, two located on either side of the valley and one on the north rim. Construction of the dams used nearby materials, and was one of the largest earthworks projects in the United States. Excavation of core materials for the dams resulted in many paleontological finds, all of which are displayed at the Western Science Center at the lake's East end. The lake is open to boating and fishing, along with hiking and other recreational activities around the lake.

== Geography ==
Diamond Valley Lake is located within the Domenigoni/Diamond valleys, between the Domenigoni Mountains and Rawson Mountains, 4 miles (6.4 km) southwest of the city of Hemet. The site was chosen because of its location between the cities of San Diego and Los Angeles, and because of the raw materials located on-site for the construction of the three dams. The location was also chosen because of its proximity, about 5 miles (8.0 km), to the existing Colorado River Aqueduct that originally supplied the lake with water.

== Construction ==
Planning for the lake began in 1987. The main goal was to meet Southern California seasonal, drought and emergency needs. MWD chose the current site because of its geographic location, and began construction planning in 1993. Construction of the lake began in 1995 with construction of the three dams. With over 40 million cubic yards of foundation excavation and 110 million cubic yards of embankment construction, the construction of the dams was the largest earthworks project in the United States.

The shovels, loaders and trucks used on the project were the largest available, and established a new standard for earth and rock movement. The two rock processing plants established for the project provided combined production exceeding the capability of any single commercial processing operation in California. Construction of the lake was the largest construction project by the MWD since building the Colorado River Aqueduct.

At its peak in 1997 and 1998, the reservoir construction project employed an average of 1,800 people. At times, more than 1,900 people labored in building the reservoir's three dams. From start to finish, about 5,000 people were employed by the construction project.

=== Dams ===
Diamond Valley Dam
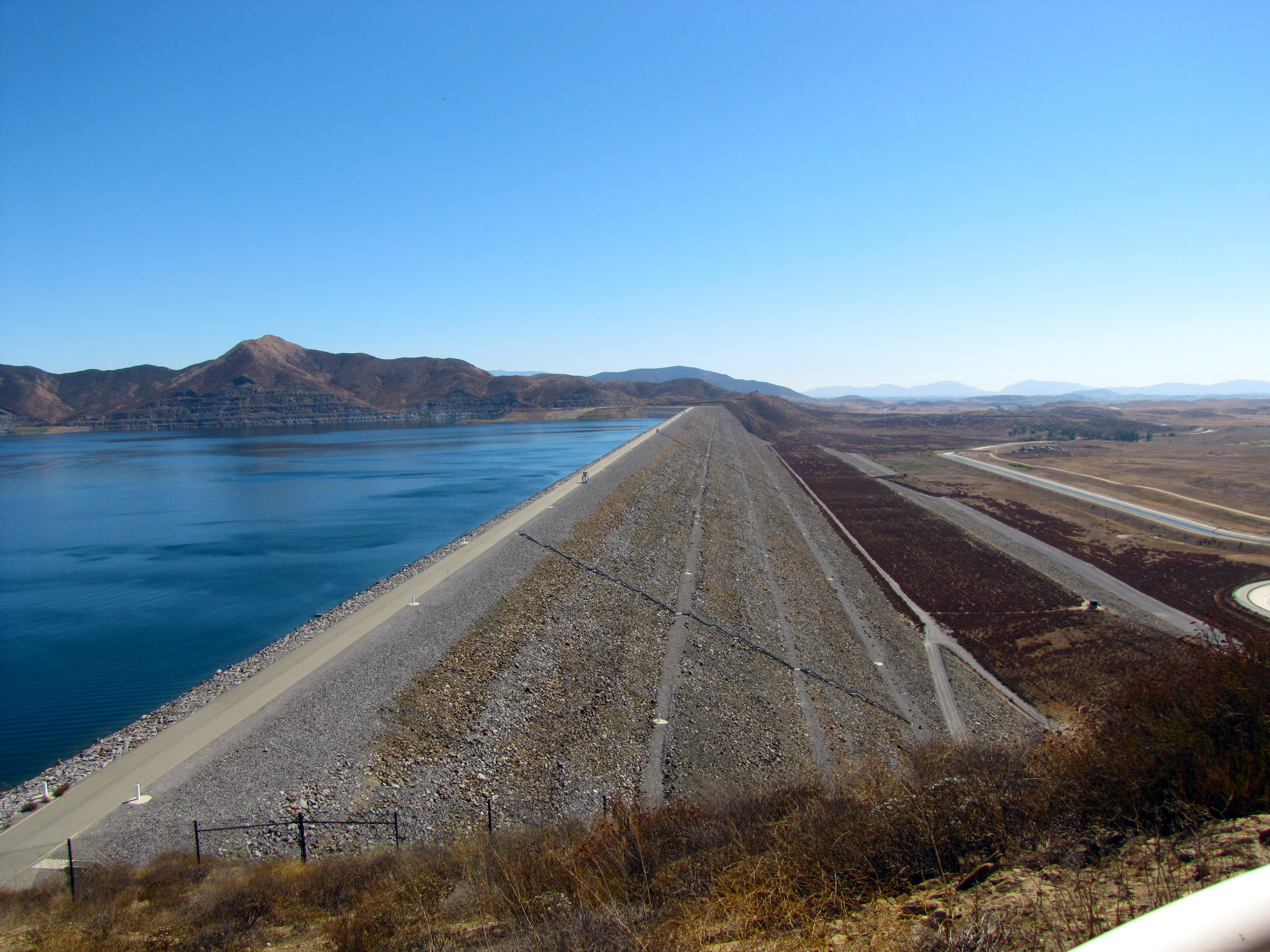
- The west dam of Diamond Valley Lake
- Interactive map of Diamond Valley Dam
- Location: Riverside County, California, United States
- Construction began: 1995
- Opening date: 1999
- Construction cost: $1.9 billion
- Operator: Metropolitan Water District of Southern California

Dam and spillways
- Type of dam: Multiple embankment
- Impounds: Diamond Valley; Domenigoni Valley
- Height: West Dam: 285 ft (87 m); East Dam: 184 ft (56 m); Saddle Dam: 129 ft (39 m)
- Length: West Dam: 8,300 ft (2,500 m); East Dam: 10,900 ft (3,300 m); Saddle Dam: 2,300 ft (700 m)
- Width (base): East Dam: 1,200 ft (370 m)

Reservoir
- Creates: Diamond Valley Lake
- Total capacity: 810,000 acre-feet 990,000,000 m^{3} (3.5×10^{10} cu ft)
- Surface area: 4,500 acres (1,800 ha)

Construction of the three dams was completed in 1999, requiring the excavation of 31,000,000 cubic metres (41,000,000 cu yd) of foundation material. The earth fill dam project required about 110,000,000 cubic yards (84,000,000 m^{3}) of sand, clay and rock. Much of the materials needed were obtained from the project area. Core materials were obtained from the silty and clayey sandy alluvium in the floor of the reservoir and the rock fill came from the bedrock highlands of the reservoir's south rim. Design and construction of the dams took into consideration the threat of earthquakes with the San Jacinto Fault Zone, located about 4 miles (6.4 km) from the reservoir, and the San Andreas Fault, located about 19 miles (31 km) from the reservoir.

==== West Dam ====
The west dam rises to 285 feet (87 m) above the valley floor. It spans 1.5 miles (2.4 km) over a nearly flat alluvial valley floor between bedrock abutment ridges. About 65% of the dam's foundation area is founded on quartzite and phyllite bedrock. The remainder is founded on dense alluvium that fills three buried channels, which are up to 120 feet (37 m) deep. The foundation excavations were extended 90 feet (27 m) below the original ground surface to remove liquefaction soils that would have made the dam unstable in an earthquake.

To minimize foundation seepage through the alluvium, 3 feet (0.91 m) thick cut-off walls of plastic concrete were constructed across the three alluvial channels and excavated at least 2 feet (0.61 m) into bedrock. To reduce seepage through the rock foundation, the entire core width was consolidation grouted and a double-line grout curtain was installed to a depth of approximately 125 feet (38 m). Grouting of the west dam took about two years to complete and required 189 miles (304 km) of grout holes.

==== East Dam ====
The 2.1-mile (3.4 km) long East Dam, constructed by a Kiewit-led joint venture, is the longest of the three dams. It measures 1,200 feet (370 m) wide at the base and 40 feet (12 m) wide at the top. Before embankment of the dam could begin, more than 18,000,000 cubic yards (14,000,000 m^{3}) of alluvium had to be excavated to reach a solid bedrock foundation.

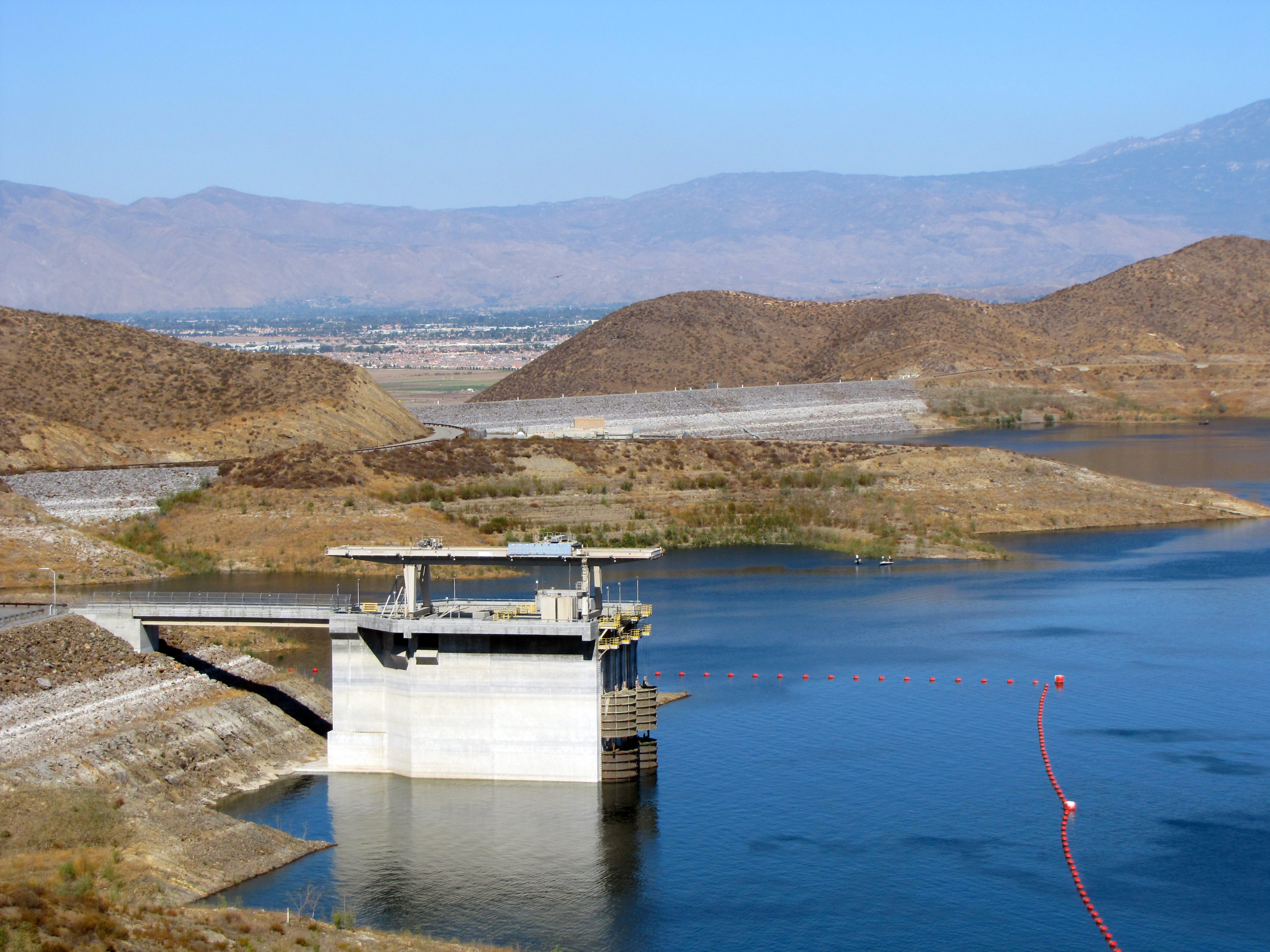
The Saddle dam and I/O tower at Diamond Valley Lake

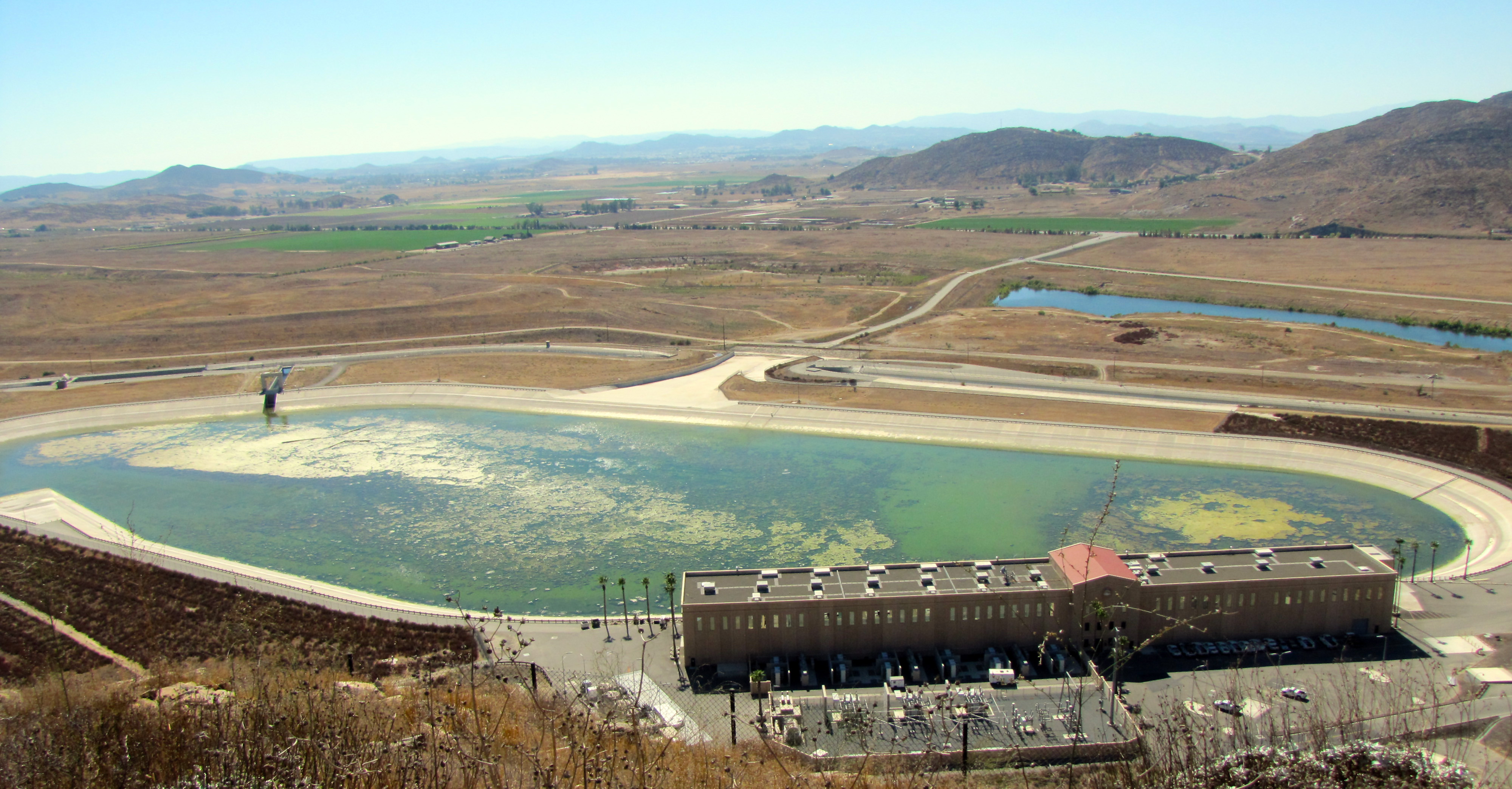
The forebay and pumping station

The embankment required 43,000,000 cubic yards (33,000,000 m^{3}) of crushed rock. An on-site crushing plant crushed and processed over 14 million tons of rock in 20 months to supply the dam's materials. The cut-off wall, which consists of a 3 feet (0.91 m) thick plastic concrete mix constructed through the weathered portion of bedrock, varies in depth from 10 feet (3.0 m) to 110 feet (34 m) and totals 250,000 square feet (23,000 m^{2}). A two-line grout curtain reaches depths of 150 feet (46 m) below the foundation in the north segment of the East Dam and 100 feet (30 m) in the south segment.

Because of the amount of material used in the construction of the east dam, some of the biggest trucks in the world were used. Twelve Caterpillar 789 dump trucks were used in construction of the East Dam.

==== Saddle Dam ====
The Saddle Dam rises 130 feet (40 m) above the lowest point in the Domenigoni Mountains ridgeline of the north rim and is around 0.5 miles (0.80 km) long. The dam was built to increase the storage capacity of the lake, which would have been limited due to the lower ridge in this area. It is founded completely on phyllite and schist bedrock. To minimize foundation seepage, a two-line grout curtain extends up to 100 feet (30 m) below the foundation.

== Reservoir ==
Filling of the lake began in 1999 with water from the Colorado River Aqueduct and San Diego Canal. Water first entered the forebay, a 35-acre (14 ha) — 163-million-US-gallon (620,000 m^{3}) — basin that held the water before being pumped through the pumping station. The pumping station, named after one of the founders of the MWD, Hiram W. Wadsworth, features twelve 6,000 horsepower (4,500 kW) pumps for moving water from the forebay to the intake-outlet (I/O) tower. In 2001, four of the twelve pumps were converted to hydroelectric turbine generators capable of producing 3 megawatts of power each. If all the pumps were converted, the entire facility could produce up to 40 megawatts of power.

Water is pumped from the pumping station, located just outside the west dam, through a 2,000-foot (610 m) long, 16-foot (4.9 m) diameter pipe and into the lake via the I/O tower. At peak rate, water flowed into the lake at 1,000 cubic feet (28 m^{3}) per second. Filling of the lake finished in 2003.

The reservoir was initially filled to its capacity of 800,000 acre-feet (990,000,000 m^{3}) in 2003. Water from the Colorado River Aqueduct stopped being used due to the threat of the Quagga mussel, an invasive species that has already contaminated other Southern California lakes served by the aqueduct. In 2009, the lake began being filled with water provided by the Inland Feeder after nearly two years without a source. The water replenished much of what was lost after drought conditions required the MWD to tap into the lake. By March 2016, an extended drought had dropped storage to 299,638 acre-feet (369,598,000 m^{3}).

== Paleontological finds ==
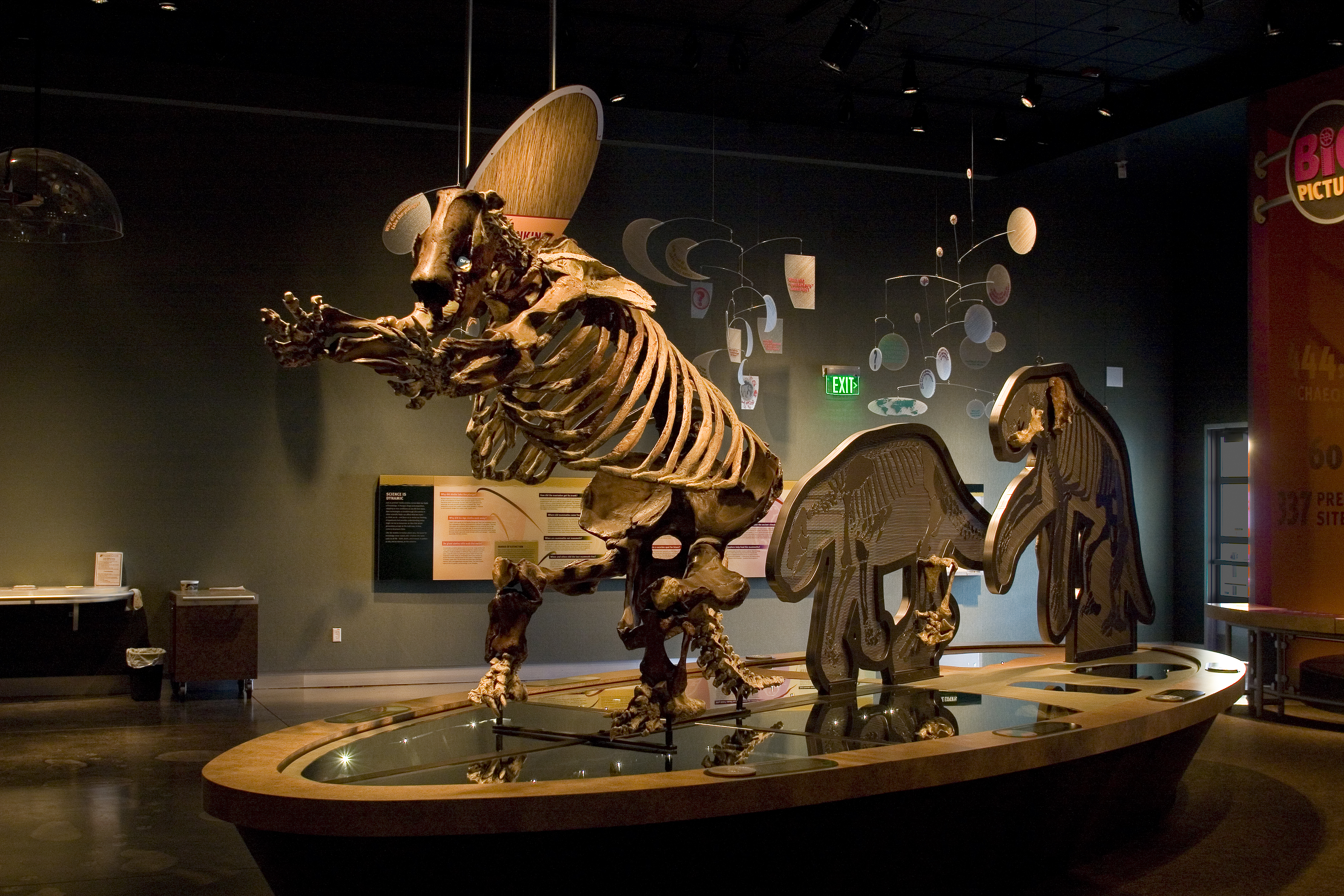
A Paramylodon harlani on display at the Western Science Center

During excavation, bones and skeletons were found from extinct mastodons, mammoth, camel, sloth, dire wolf and long-horned bison. Paleontologists from the San Bernardino County Museum in Redlands, California uncovered thousands of fossils in the Diamond and Domenigoni valleys that will add immensely to the store of public knowledge about the region. Collectively, these animal fossils are named the Diamond Valley Lake Local Fauna.

The paleontological finds of mammoth, mastodon, bison, and other Pleistocene Epoch species from Diamond Valley Lake provide a unique snapshot on inland southern California during the Ice Ages, and bridge a massive information gap between fossil deposits at La Brea Tar Pits in Los Angeles, California and Ice Age sites in the Mojave Desert. Unofficially, the Diamond Valley Lake area is often referred to as the "Valley of the Mastodons". Fossils from the Diamond Valley Lake site comprise a classic late Pleistocene assemblage, which includes the following extinct animals:

- Jefferson's ground sloth, Megalonyx jeffersonii
- Harlan's ground sloth, Paramylodon harlani
- Dire wolf, Aenocyon dirus
- Giant short-faced bear, Arctodus simus
- Sabre-toothed cat, Smilodon fatalis
- American lion, Panthera atrox
- Pacific mastodon, Mammut pacificus
- Columbian mammoth, Mammuthus columbi
- Western horse, Equus occidentalis
- Mexican horse, Equus conversidens
- Flat-headed peccary, Platygonus compressus
- “Yesterday’s” camel, Camelops hesternus
- Ancient bison, Bison antiquus
- Long-horned bison, Bison latifrons
- Diminutive Pronghorn, Capromeryx minor

Many fossils of rabbits, rodents and pond turtles, as well as coyotes, deer and the Black bear, have been recovered as well. One of the most common animals identified from the Diamond Valley Lake site by San Bernardino County Museum scientists was originally identified as the extinct American mastodon, Mammut americanum. However, these fossils were later identified as a new species Mammut pacificus.

In North American paleontology, mastodons are thought to have been solitary forest-dwelling browsers. The abundance of mastodons in the fossil record from the site suggests that, during the last Ice Age, the Diamond Valley Lake site was more wooded or forested than today.

Fossil remains of ponderosa pine and manzanita recovered from the site lend credence to this interpretation. Radiometric dating of fossil plants from the Diamond Valley Lake site confirms an age range of less than 13,000 years ago to more than 60,000 years ago for these fossils.

== Recreation ==
Diamond Valley Lake offers fishing and light boating on the lake. A recreation park, aquatic center, visitor center and the Western Science Center along with the lake marina are located on the eastern end of the lake. The park and aquatic center are operated by the Valley-Wide Recreation & Park District. A viewpoint, offering views of the pumping station and I/O tower, along with most of the lake is located on the western end of the lake. To the south of the lake is the Southwestern Riverside County Multi-Species Reserve, a 13,500-acre (5,500 ha) preserve between Diamond Valley Lake and Skinner Reservoir. The reserve is home to at least 16 sensitive, endangered or threatened native California bird, animal and plant species.

Stocking of the lake with fish began before the reservoir was filled, with a small rearing pond being placed on the bottom of the valley. The lake has several species of freshwater fish; largemouth bass, smallmouth bass, bluegill, crappie, rainbow trout, striped bass, channel catfish, and shad. It was discovered that a small population of flathead catfish were accidentally introduced. It is considered one of the best fisheries in California.

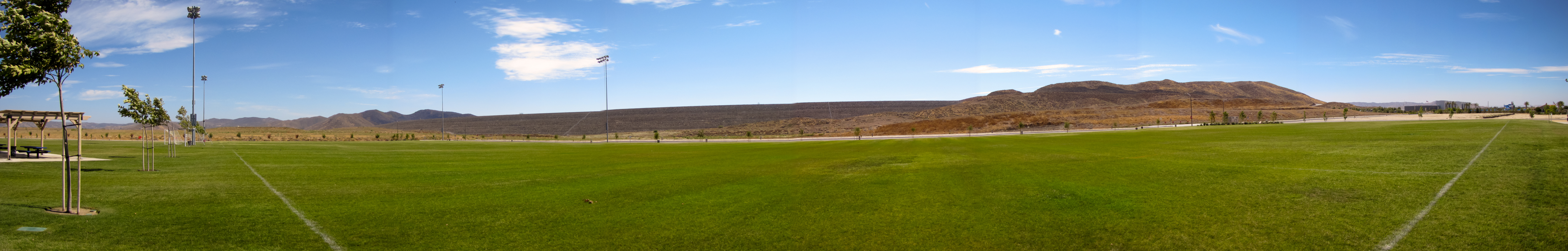
The East Dam and recreation park of Diamond Valley Lake. The aquatic center and Western Science Center can be seen at the far right.

Much of the area around the lake remains undeveloped and empty. Original plans included large recreation areas on both the eastern and western end of the lake complete with golf courses, campgrounds, swimming lakes, water parks and other amenities. The MWD still plans on building the additional recreation facilities, but lack of funding and lack of support from developers has prevented them from doing so.

== Gallery ==
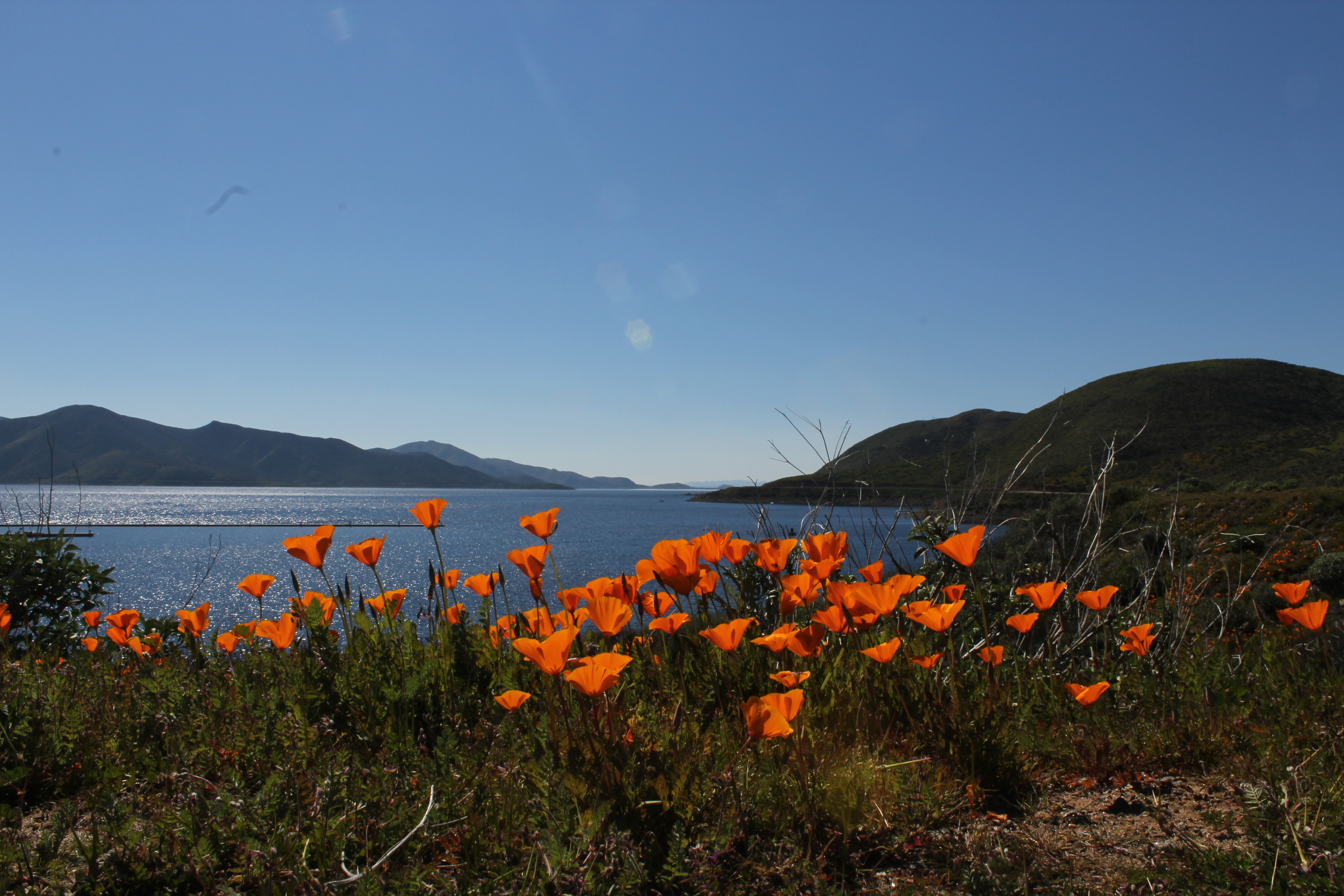
A view of Diamond Valley Lake and California Poppies

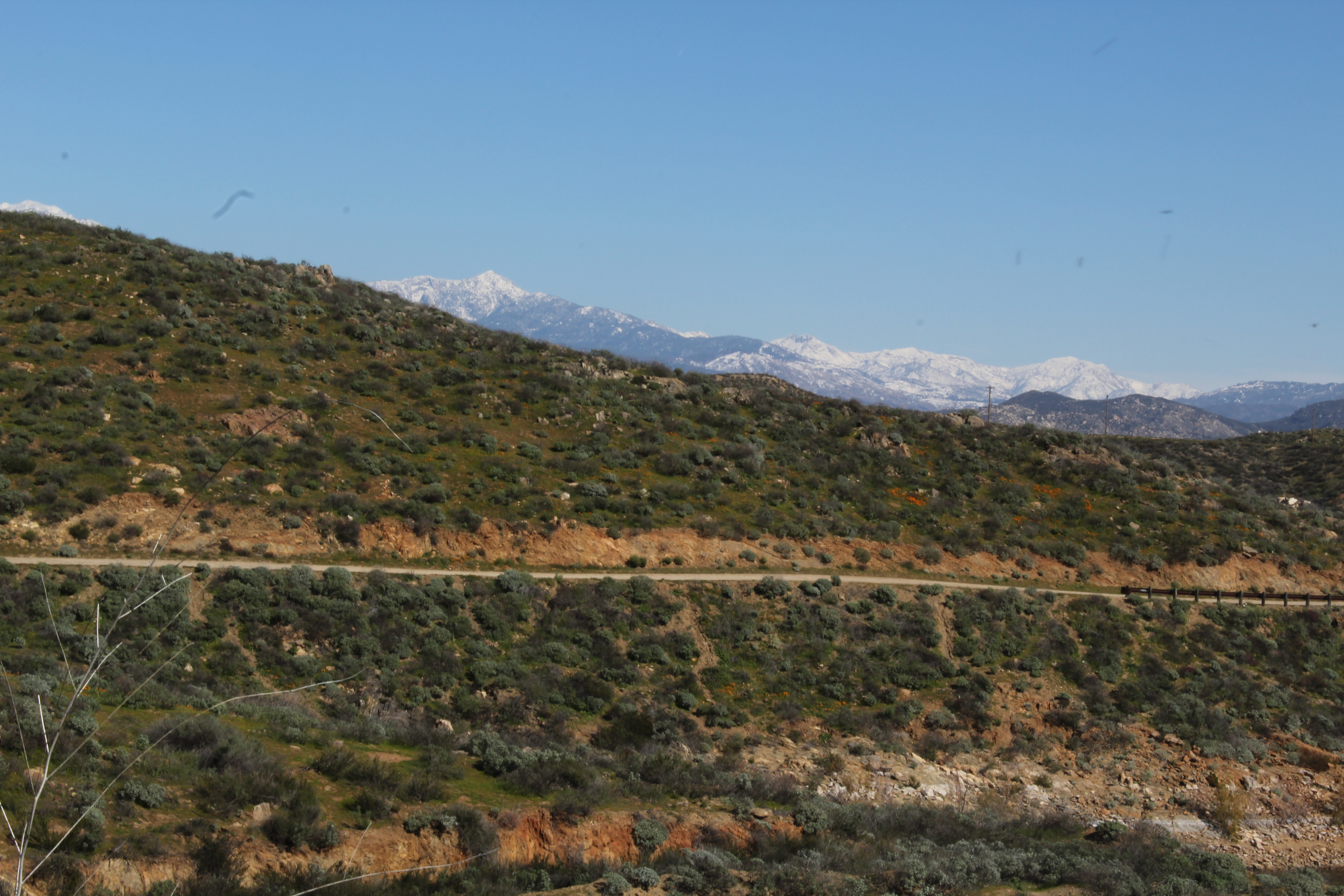
A trail around Diamond Valley Lake

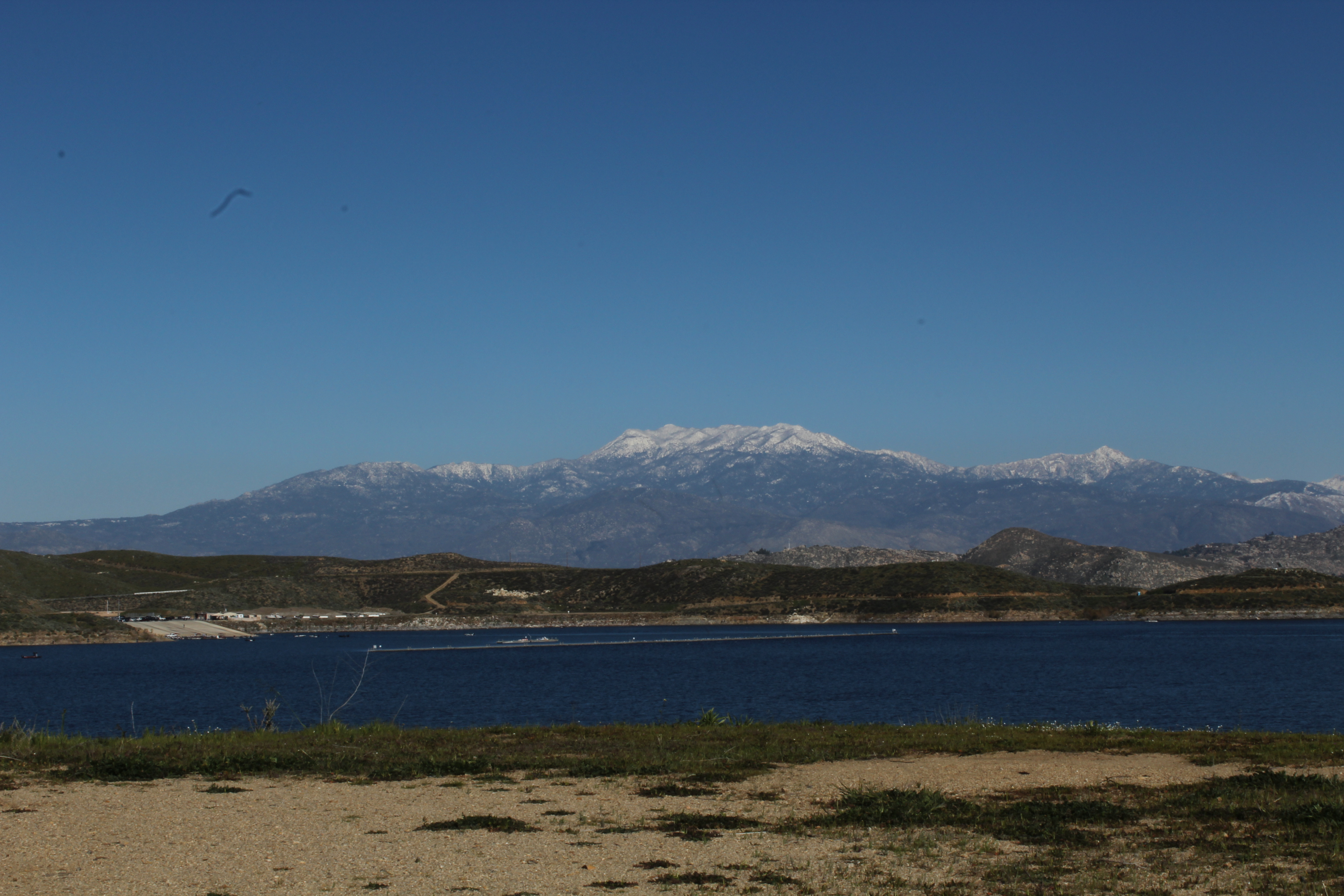
A view of the San Jacinto mountains from Diamond Valley Lake

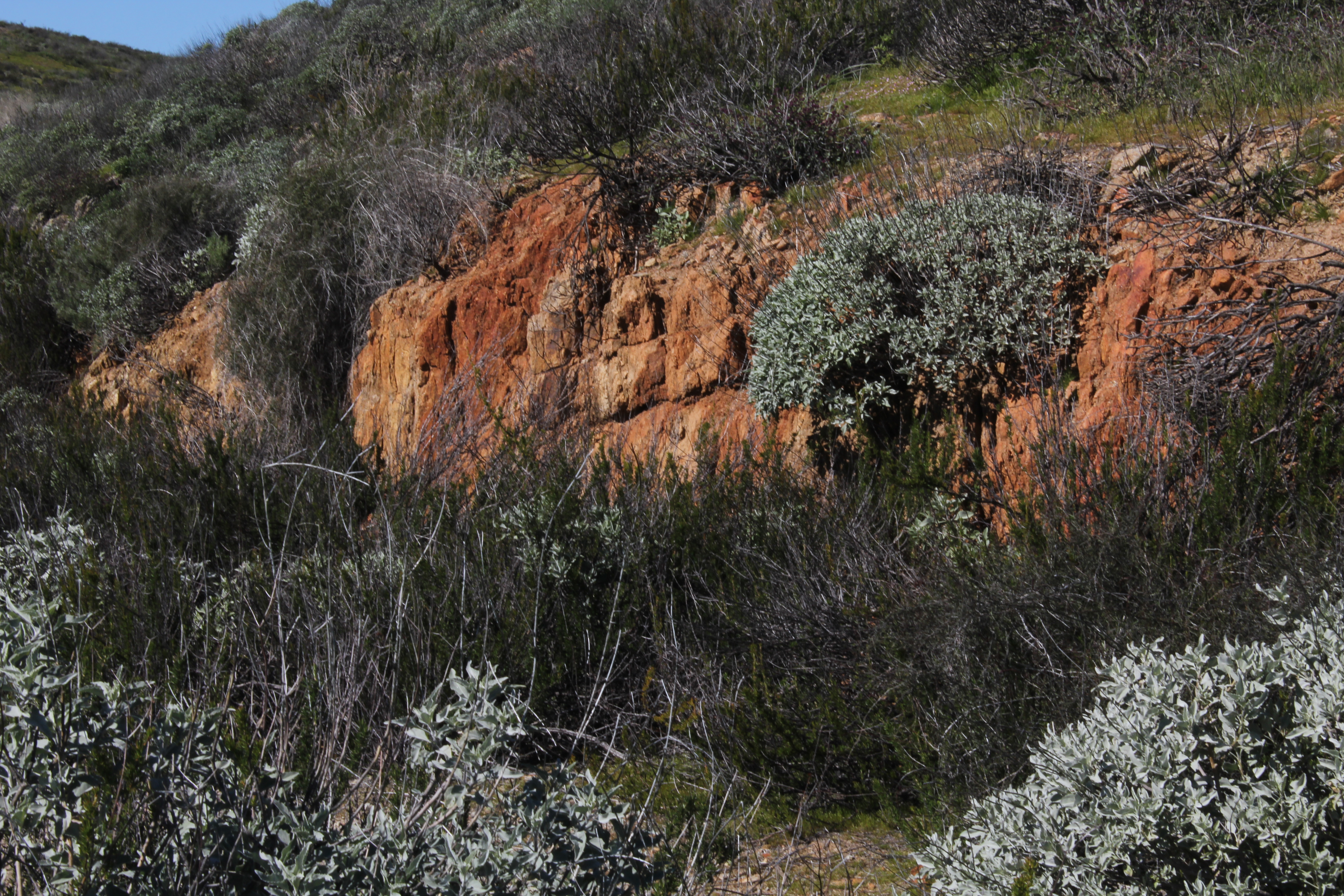
Chaparral and a rocky outcrop at Diamond Valley Lake

== See also ==
- List of dams and reservoirs in California
- List of lakes in California
- List of largest reservoirs of California
