= Salt Creek Beach Park =

Park in Dana Point, California

Salt Creek Beach park
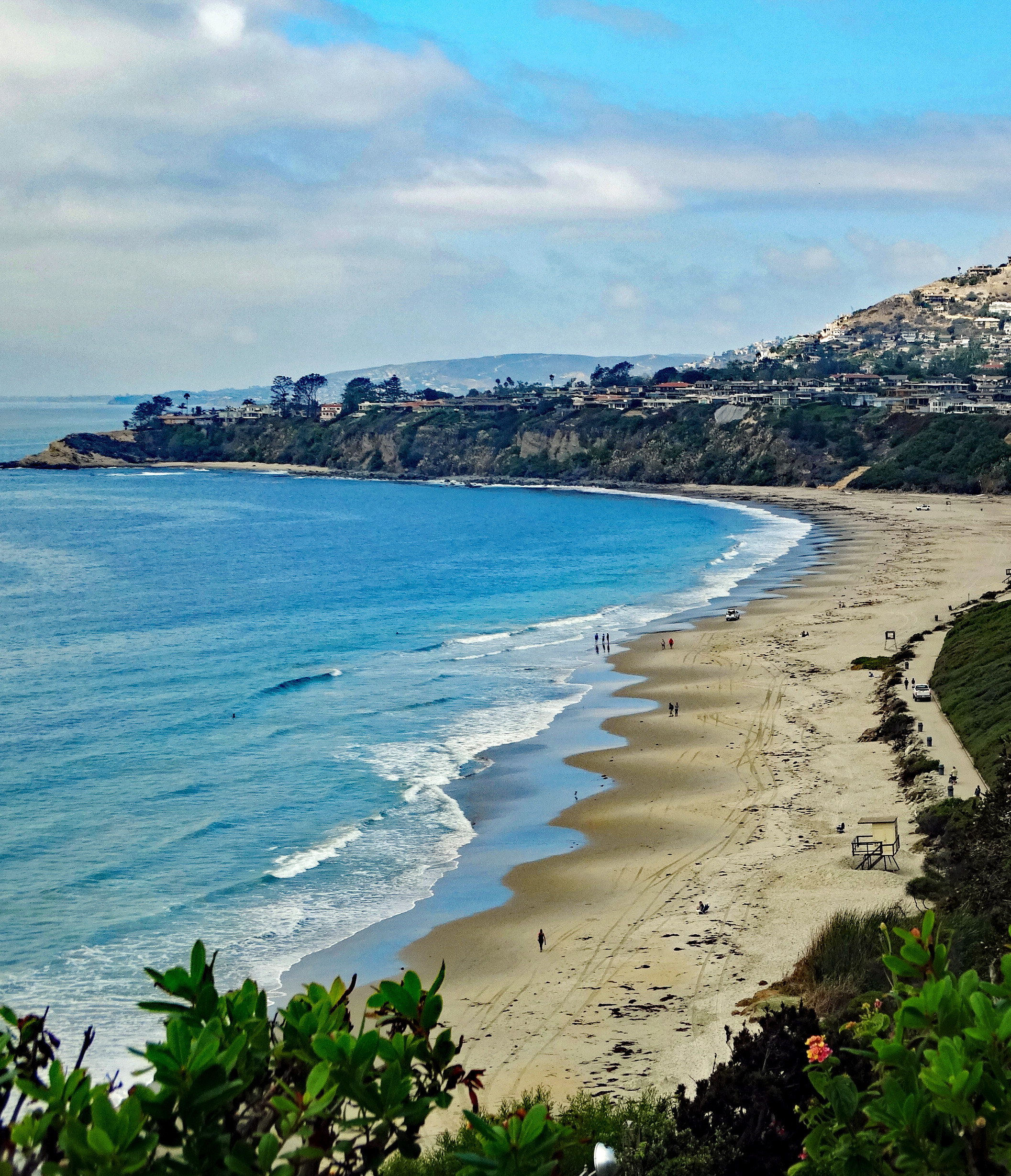
- Interactive map of Salt Creek Beach park
- Type: Community park
- Location: 33333 South Pacific Coast Highway; Dana Point, California
- Coordinates: 33.4765°N 117.7217°W
- Area: 18 acres (7.3 ha)

Aerial views of a surfing competition at Salt Creek Beach, Dana Point, California.

Salt Creek Beach Park is a beach park located in Dana Point, California, in the county of Orange. A popular destination for South Orange County residents, it features amenities such as a halfcourt basketball court, beach volleyball, and a seven-acre grassy Bluff Park, and offers opportunities for surfing, swimming, and fishing. It is located about 10 miles (16 km) south of Laguna Beach, 70 miles (110 km) north of San Diego, and 45 miles (72 km) south of Los Angeles.

== History ==
Due to a 1965 Grand Jury Report that highlighted the “overcrowding of our parks, beaches, and harbors, Orange County made an effort to acquire more public and recreational areas. The Salt Creek area had always been a popular location for swimming and surfing, but was purchased by the Laguna Niguel Corporation, then later AVCO Community Developers, who set the land aside for private community development

Public pressure rose in the late 1960s to “Save Salt Creek,” a movement that fought for public access and use of the beach. Negotiations were ended on February 2, 1971, when AVCO's offer was accepted, promising to provide the county a portion of the property as a public beach. The controversial project had many problems and delays and was not finished until 1976 though a partially completed facility was opened in 1972.

Today the park is completed with almost a mile of public beach that hosts hundreds of thousands of beach goers each year.
