= Valley Fire (disambiguation) =

The Valley Fire may refer to:

- Valley Fire (2015), a destructive wildfire that burned more than 76,000 acres (31,000 ha) in Lake County, California in 2015
- Valley Fire (2018), a wildfire that burned in San Bernardino National Forest, California, in 2018
- Valley Fire (2020), a wildfire that burned in San Diego County, California in 2020
