= Santa Rosa Wilderness =

Protected wilderness area in California, United States

- IUCN category Ib (wilderness area)
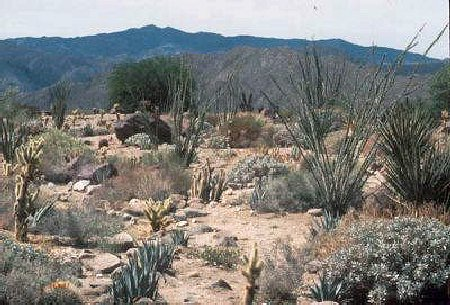
- Interactive map of Santa Rosa Wilderness
- Location: Riverside County, California
- Nearest city: Palm Desert, California
- Coordinates: 33°30′54″N 116°19′04″W
- Area: 72,259 acres (292.42 km^{2})
- Established: 1984 (California Wilderness Act)
- Governing body: U.S. Bureau of Land Management / U.S. Forest Service

The Santa Rosa Wilderness is a 72,259-acre (292.42 km^{2}) wilderness area in Southern California, in the Santa Rosa Mountains of Riverside and San Diego counties, California. It is in the Colorado Desert section of the Sonoran Desert, above the Coachella Valley and Lower Colorado River Valley regions in a Peninsular Range, between La Quinta to the north and Anza Borrego Desert State Park to the south. The United States Congress established the wilderness in 1984 with the passage of the California Wilderness Act (Public Law 98-425), managed by both the US Forest Service (San Bernardino National Forest, 13,801 acres) and the Bureau of Land Management (58,458 acres). In 2009, the Omnibus Public Land Management Act (P.L. 111–11) was signed into law which added more than 2,000 acres (8.1 km^{2}). Most of the Santa Rosa Wilderness is within the Santa Rosa and San Jacinto Mountains National Monument.

The Santa Rosa Mountains contain areas of historic and modern cultural significance, such as ancient game trails, roasting pits, milling stations, rock shelters and examples of rock art. Native Americans have identified areas that are currently used for temporary habitation, resource collection and ritual hunting. Evidence of post-colonial era American settlements and mining activities includes quarry sites, mining prospects, irrigation infrastructure and water improvements associated with natural springs.

== Wildlife, vegetation and topography ==
The wilderness protects a portion of habitat that supports the largest herd of peninsular bighorn sheep (Ovis canadensis nelsoni) in the country; the sheep's range encompasses much of inland Southern California, south of Riverside and San Bernardino counties. They can also be found in Mexico, in the peninsular states of Baja California and Baja California Sur. The Bighorn Institute (a non-profit research group established in 1982 by several biologists and veterinarians) estimates that approximately 60 adult sheep live in the Santa Rosa Mountains, and a total population of 800 sheep in the Peninsular Ranges north of Mexico.

The Peninsular Range bighorn sheep is a subspecies of bighorn sheep (Ovis canadensis) that has been protected since 1971 under the California Endangered Species Protection Act (CESPA), and federally-protected since 1998 under the Endangered Species Act (ESA). The Peninsular Range bighorn sheep herd utilize the entire range between 1,000 to 4,000 feet (1,200 m) elevation. Bear Creek, Deep Canyon and Martinez Canyon are important sites as summer grazing and browsing areas, and provide the sheep with the rugged terrain necessary for evading threats, as well as for lambing.

In addition to the bighorn sheep, the Santa Rosa Wilderness also is home to bobcat, coyote, mountain lion, and mule deer.

Native and rare plants in the Santa Rosa Wilderness include shrubs such as Santa Rosa sage (Salvia eremostachya), and Nuttall's scrub oak (Quercus dumosa). Perennials and herbs include Santa Rosa Mountains leptosiphon (Linanthus floribundus ssp. hallii) and triple-ribbed milkvetch (Astragalus tricarinatus). Cacti and succulent plants include the beavertail prickly-pear (Opuntia basilaris), chaparral yucca (Hesperoyucca whipplei), desert agave (Agave deserti), Gander's cholla (Cylindropuntia ganderi) and Mojave yucca (Yucca schidigera).

The rugged terrain is formed by uplifted blocks of igneous and metamorphic rock situated between two major tectonic fault lines, the San Andreas and the San Jacinto Faults. Perennial streams erode the steep-walled canyons and support large fan palm oases. The Santa Rosa Mountain range, in addition to the two faults, all trend northwest–southeast as part of the Peninsular Range that extends from Southern California through Baja California, México.

== Recreation ==
The Santa Rosa Wilderness joins wilderness areas in the San Bernardino National Forest along its western border and the designated California State Wilderness in Anza Borrego Desert State Park to the south.

Recreational activities in the Santa Rosa Wilderness include backpacking, horseback riding, day hiking, and nature study/photography.

- The Boo Hoff equestrian trail is one of the few trails in the wilderness that is constructed and maintained by a local equestrian club.
- The Cactus Spring Trail which is an ancient aboriginal pathway, links the Santa Rosa plateau with the desert floor in the Coachella Valley. To the west, this trail connects with designated wilderness areas in the San Bernardino National Forest.
- Oases trails
  - Bear Creek Oasis
  - Lost Canyon Oasis
- Guadelupe Canyon and Devil Canyon
- Rockhouse Canyon and valley, in the southern wilderness area, has remnants of early Native American and European settlers.
- Rabbit Peak, located near the southeastern boundary, is a notable desert peak for its challenging climb to the 6,623-foot (2,019 m) summit. Local Sierra Club chapters lead organized day and overnight trips to the peak. Universities and local colleges utilize the Santa Rosa Mountains frequently as a living laboratory for scientific and informal studies and outings.

Hunting is restricted to the southern half of the wilderness since the northern portion is located within a State Wildlife Refuge. Deer, quail and dove are hunted in season.

== See also ==
- Category:Fauna of the Colorado Desert
- List of Sonoran Desert wildflowers
- Category:Geography of the Colorado Desert
