= Forest Falls, California =

Unincorporated community in California, United States

- Unincorporated community
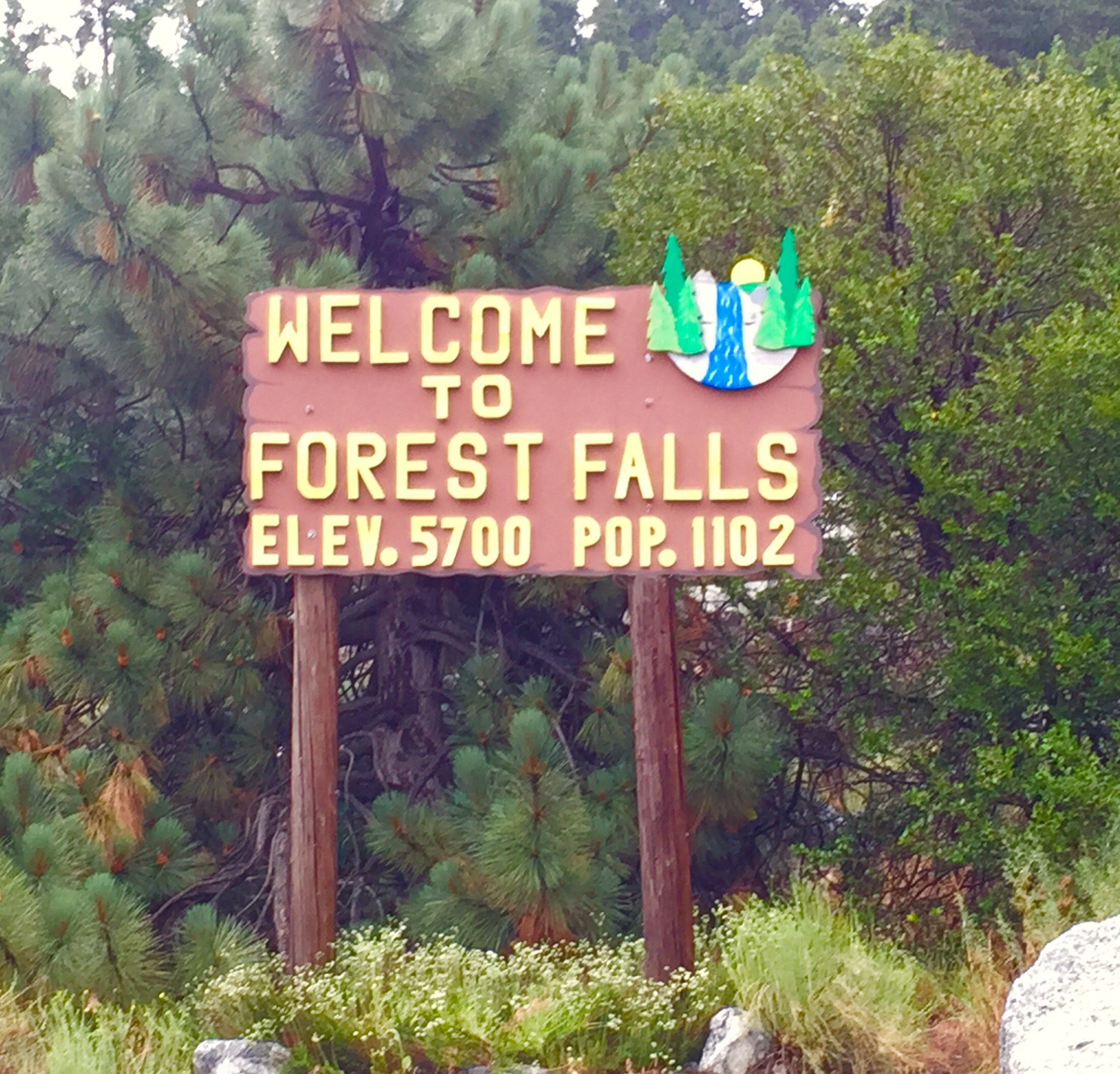
- Forest Falls welcome sign

- Location within the state of California Forest Falls, California (the United States)
- Coordinates: 34°05′18″N 116°55′13″W
- Country: United States
- State: California
- County: San Bernardino

Area
  - Total: 22.4 sq mi (58.1 km^{2})
- Elevation: 5,700 ft (1,700 m)

Population (2010)
  - Total: 1,102
  - Density: 49.1/sq mi (19.0/km^{2})
- Time zone: UTC-8 (Pacific (PST))
  - Summer (DST): UTC-7 (PDT)
- ZIP codes: 92339

Forest Falls is an unincorporated community in San Bernardino County, California, 75 miles (121 km) due east of Los Angeles. The community has a population of 1,102 and contains 712 houses. Forest Falls is best known for the waterfalls on Vivian and Falls creeks and as a point of access for recreation in the San Bernardino National Forest, particularly the San Gorgonio Wilderness Area, which lies directly north of the community.

== History ==
The earliest known inhabitants of the upper reaches of Mill Creek Canyon, in which Forest Falls resides, were the indigenous Yuhaaviatam, a Takic people descended from the Shoshone. On encountering these people, the Spaniards named them Serranos or mountaineers. Local clan groups that inhabited the current Yucaipa, Mentone/Crafton, and Redlands areas spent the summers in the cooler environs of the canyon hunting, fishing, and gathering. They returned to the warmer valleys at the base of the mountains in the autumn after gathering acorns, a staple of their diet.

The first American settlement in Forest Falls was at a sawmill built under the direction of Mormon settlers Charles Rich and Amasa Lyman in the summer of 1853. Fellow Mormon pioneer David Frederick and his wife Mary Ann Winner Frederick were the first year-round resident managers of the mill from 1854 to 1858.

The discovery of marble and onyx in the farthest reaches of the canyon in 1888 led to the development of the town of Burris Camp when George Burris discovered a mile-long vein of translucent white, pink, blue, and green marble in 1904. At its peak, the Burris quarry employed a thousand workers to cut and move the stone by a small incline railway and ox carts to Los Angeles, but the vein began to fracture before the 1920s. The failure of the marble mine left limestone to quarry through World War II into the 1940s.

In 1897, California pioneer Richard Jackson patented one hundred and sixty acres and built Forest Home Resort, ferrying guests by stagecoach from the train in Redlands. He sold the resort to his brother-in-law, Thomas Akers, who expanded it with a land patent of an additional one hundred and sixty acres. Forest Home Resort operated under the succeeding ownership of Cyrus Baldwin, Reverend Frank Culver and then his son Frank Culver, Jr., and Harold Durant from 1905 until 1938 when Dr. Henrietta Mears arranged to purchase the famous resort and it became Forest Home Christian Conference Center. Redlands banker N.L. Levering purchased 640 acres from the Southern Pacific Railroad in 1920 and subdivided the land into 700 lots for home sites, calling it the Valley of the Falls Tract. By 1930, four more resorts operated in upper Mill Creek Canyon; Big Falls Lodge, Torreys, Big Pine Resort, and the Elkhorn Inn, owned by Mrs. James A. Roulette. Forest Home had a post office, but Mrs. Roulette petitioned the U.S. government for a second one and won the right to operate it in her store in 1929 as the Fallsvale post office. In 1960, the Forest Home and Fallsvale post offices combined to create Forest Falls, the new name for the previously separate communities of Valley of the Falls, Fallsvale, and Forest Home.

== Geography ==
Forest Falls is situated in the San Bernardino Mountains of California, at elevations ranging from approximately 5,000 feet (1,500 m) to 6,000 feet (1,800 m) along the steep gradient of Mill Creek, a tributary of the Santa Ana River. It lies 75 miles (121 km) due east of the Los Angeles Civic Center, and 21 miles (34 km) from San Bernardino, the nearest large city and the county seat. The community stretches for approximately 5 miles (8.0 km) in a narrow band primarily along the south side of the linear canyon of Mill Creek, which trends slightly north of east. The highest portions of the San Bernardino Mountains, including southern California's highest point, San Gorgonio Mountain at 11,503 feet (3,506 m), lie directly north of Forest Falls in the San Gorgonio Wilderness Area. The falls for which the community is named descend from this high area over the northern edge of the canyon of Mill Creek.

=== Geology ===
The rocks immediately surrounding Forest Falls are basement rocks characteristic of the major part of the San Bernardino Mountains, that is, Paleoproterozoic gneiss, Neoproterozoic to Paleozoic marble and quartzite, and Late Cretaceous granitic rocks. Marble and quartzite are present only in minor amounts in the immediate vicinity, although a small marble quarry up-canyon from the town was operated sporadically and uneconomically from 1908 into the 1940s. The extremely linear canyon in which Forest Falls is located follows the trace of the Mill Creek Fault, a now-inactive strand of the San Andreas Fault system along which approximately 8 kilometres (5.0 mi) of right-lateral strike-slip displacement occurred during the period from 500,000 to 250,000 years ago. (Presently active strands of this fault system lie to the south.) The canyon itself is the result of erosion by Mill Creek of the highly fractured rock along this linear fault zone. Because the San Bernardino Mountains are a young, steep and rapidly rising mountain range, erosion rates are extremely high and have been estimated to average as great as 1,560 millimetres (61 in) per 1,000 years in Mill Creek Canyon on hillside gradients as high as 36 degrees.

=== Climate ===
Forest Falls, in common with the rest of California, enjoys a Mediterranean climate, receiving the majority of its precipitation during the winter months, frequently in the form of snow. Temperatures are temperate, reaching average highs in the 80s during the summer, and lows in the 20s during the winter. Precipitation is higher than in the adjacent valleys and averages more than 40 inches (1,000 mm) per year. Summer thunderstorms occasionally occur, particularly in the later part of the season. The amount of snow received during winter months largely depends on the area of Forest Falls under consideration, as the community extends over an elevation range of approximately 1,000 feet (300 m). Upper Canyon, as it is locally known, that is, the eastern higher-elevation end of the community, receives on average twice the amount of snow fall as Lower Canyon. Snowfall varies, but on occasion as much as six to seven feet has been recorded, the most on average however is around one to two feet sporadically throughout the winter.

Climate data for Forest Falls
Month	Jan	Feb	Mar	Apr	May	Jun	Jul	Aug	Sep	Oct	Nov	Dec	Year
Record high °F (°C)	69 (21)	72 (22)	77 (25)	94 (34)	93 (34)	106 (41)	100 (38)	97 (36)	98 (37)	93 (34)	78 (26)	72 (22)	106 (41)
Mean daily maximum °F (°C)	44 (7)	47 (8)	53 (12)	60 (16)	67 (19)	76 (24)	81 (27)	81 (27)	76 (24)	64 (18)	52 (11)	45 (7)	62 (17)
Mean daily minimum °F (°C)	29 (−2)	30 (−1)	32 (0)	35 (2)	41 (5)	49 (9)	55 (13)	55 (13)	50 (10)	41 (5)	34 (1)	29 (−2)	40 (4)
Record low °F (°C)	6 (−14)	5 (−15)	11 (−12)	17 (−8)	25 (−4)	30 (−1)	40 (4)	37 (3)	30 (−1)	18 (−8)	10 (−12)	6 (−14)	5 (−15)
Average precipitation inches (mm)	8.39 (213)	8.99 (228)	8.03 (204)	2.53 (64)	1.32 (34)	.28 (7.1)	.10 (2.5)	.33 (8.4)	1.07 (27)	2.01 (51)	3.45 (88)	5.16 (131)	41.66 (1,058)
Source: Weather Channel

== See also ==
- Valley Fire
