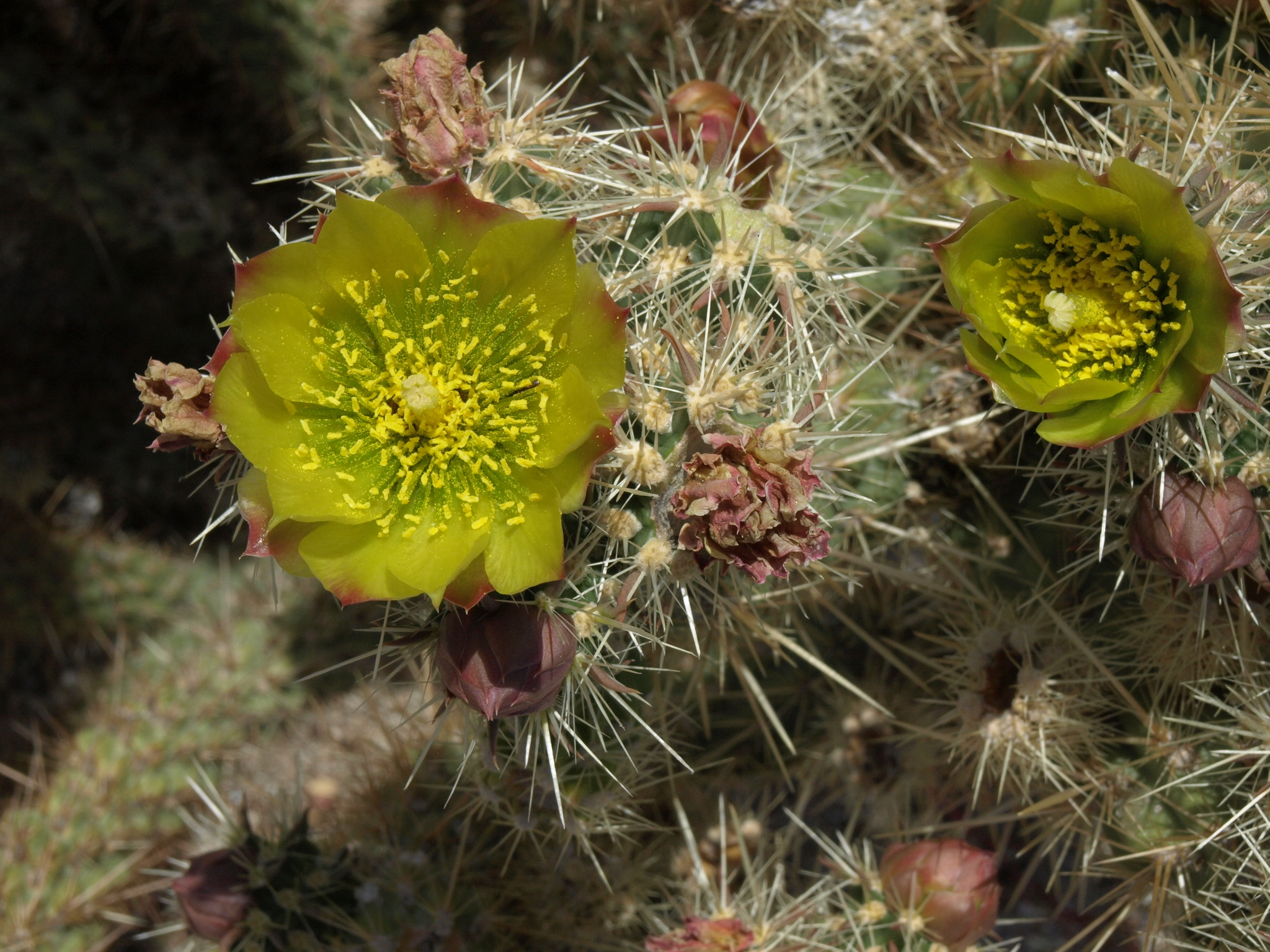

Scientific classification
- Kingdom: Plantae
- Clade: Tracheophytes
- Clade: Angiosperms
- Clade: Eudicots
- Order: Caryophyllales
- Family: Cactaceae
- Genus: Cylindropuntia
- Species: C. bernardina

Binomial name
- Cylindropuntia bernardina (Engelmann ex Parish) M. A. Baker, Cloud-H. & Rebman

Synonyms
- Opuntia bernardina Engelmann ex Parish (basionym); Opuntia parkeri Engemann ex J.M. Coulter; Opuntia californica var. parkeri (J.M. Coulter) Pinkava; Cylindropuntia californica var. parkeri (J.M. Coulter) Pinkava; Cylindropuntia californica subsp. parkeri (J.M. Coulter) Guzmán

= Cylindropuntia bernardina =

Species of cholla cactus

Cylindropuntia bernardina is a species of cholla cactus commonly known as the cane cholla or valley cholla, native to California and northwestern Baja California. It is an erect cholla that grows up to 2–3 meters tall, and occurs primarily in the foothills of the Transverse and Peninsular Ranges, parts of the Sonoran Desert, and in the Coast Ranges with a few populations around the Cuyama River. It was formerly placed as the variety parkeri of Cylindropuntia californica until it was renamed to C. bernardina. It is more closely related to Cylindropuntia ganderi than to C. californica.

== Description ==
This plant grows in an erect habit up to 3 meters tall. The terminal segments of the stem are generally 16 to 40 cm long, 1.7 to 4 cm in diameter and firmly attached, with tubercles 16 to 35 mm large and less than 7 mm high. The spines are generally less than 3.5 cm long, colored yellow to orange-brown, with the sheath translucent white to gold-brown. The flowers are yellow, often tinged with red tips. The filaments are colored green or yellow, while the stigma is cream to yellow. The green to yellow fruits are a leathery to dry texture, and have few to no spines.

Morphology of Cylindropuntia bernardina

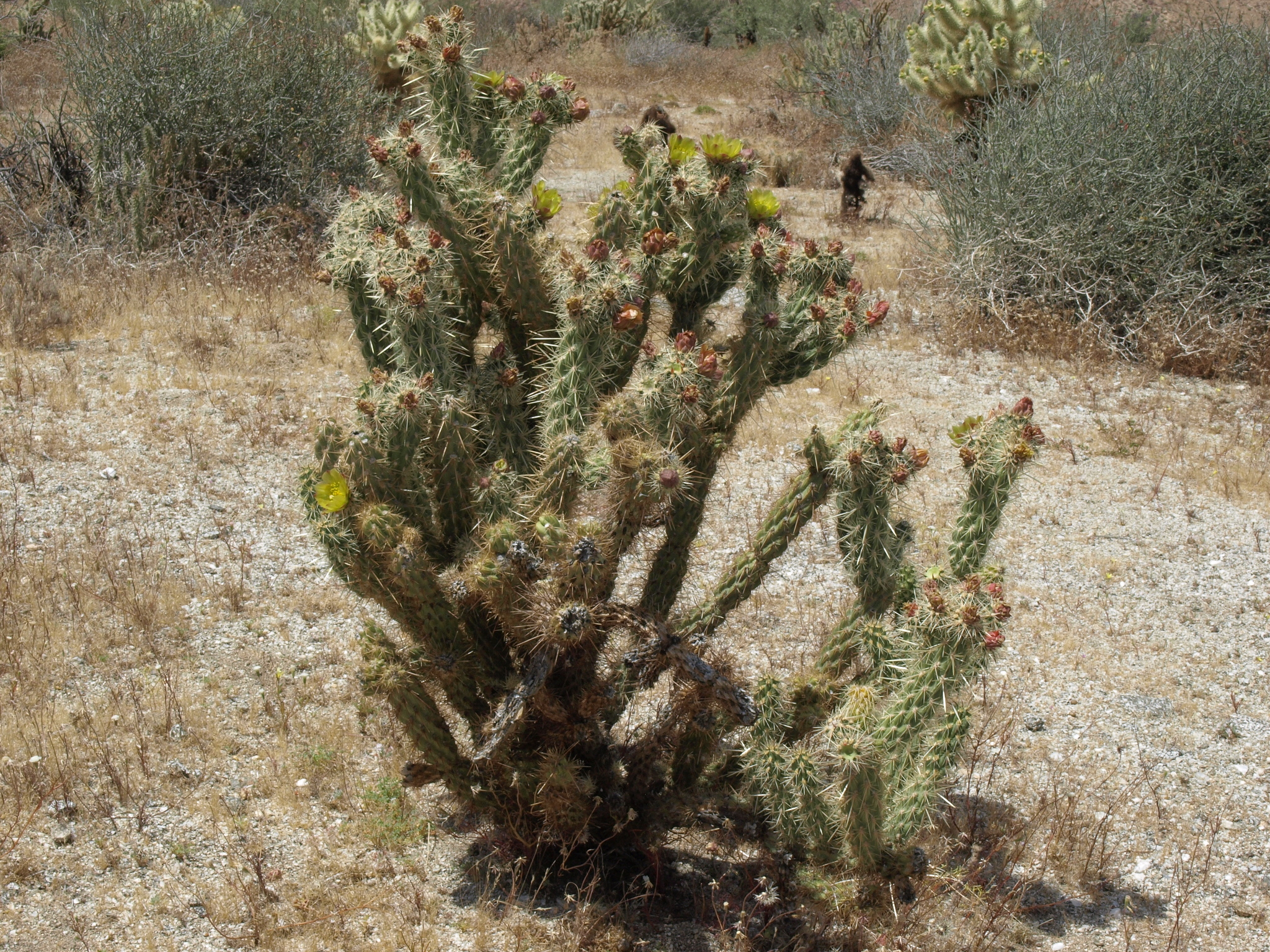
Habit

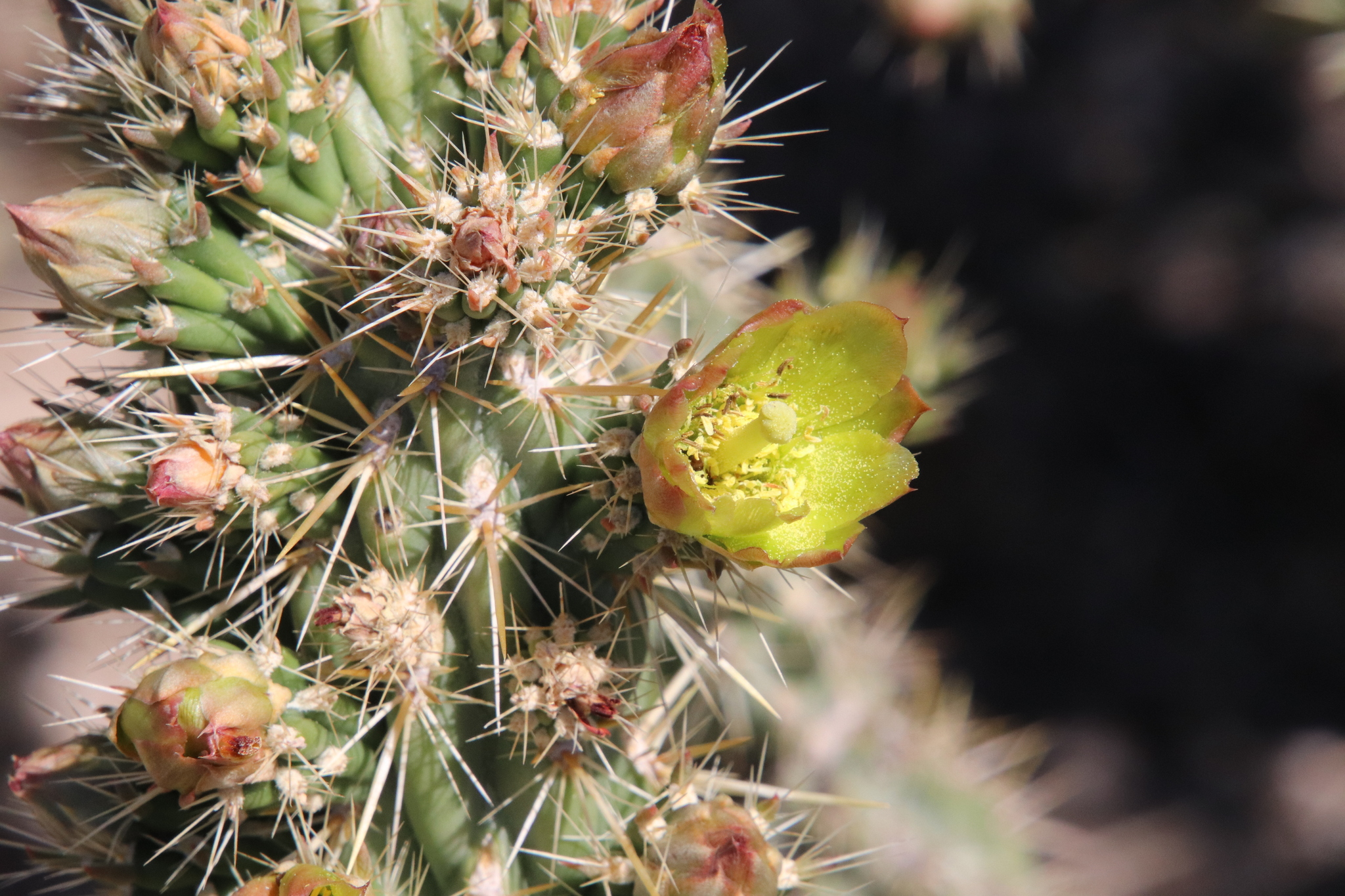
The flower and buds

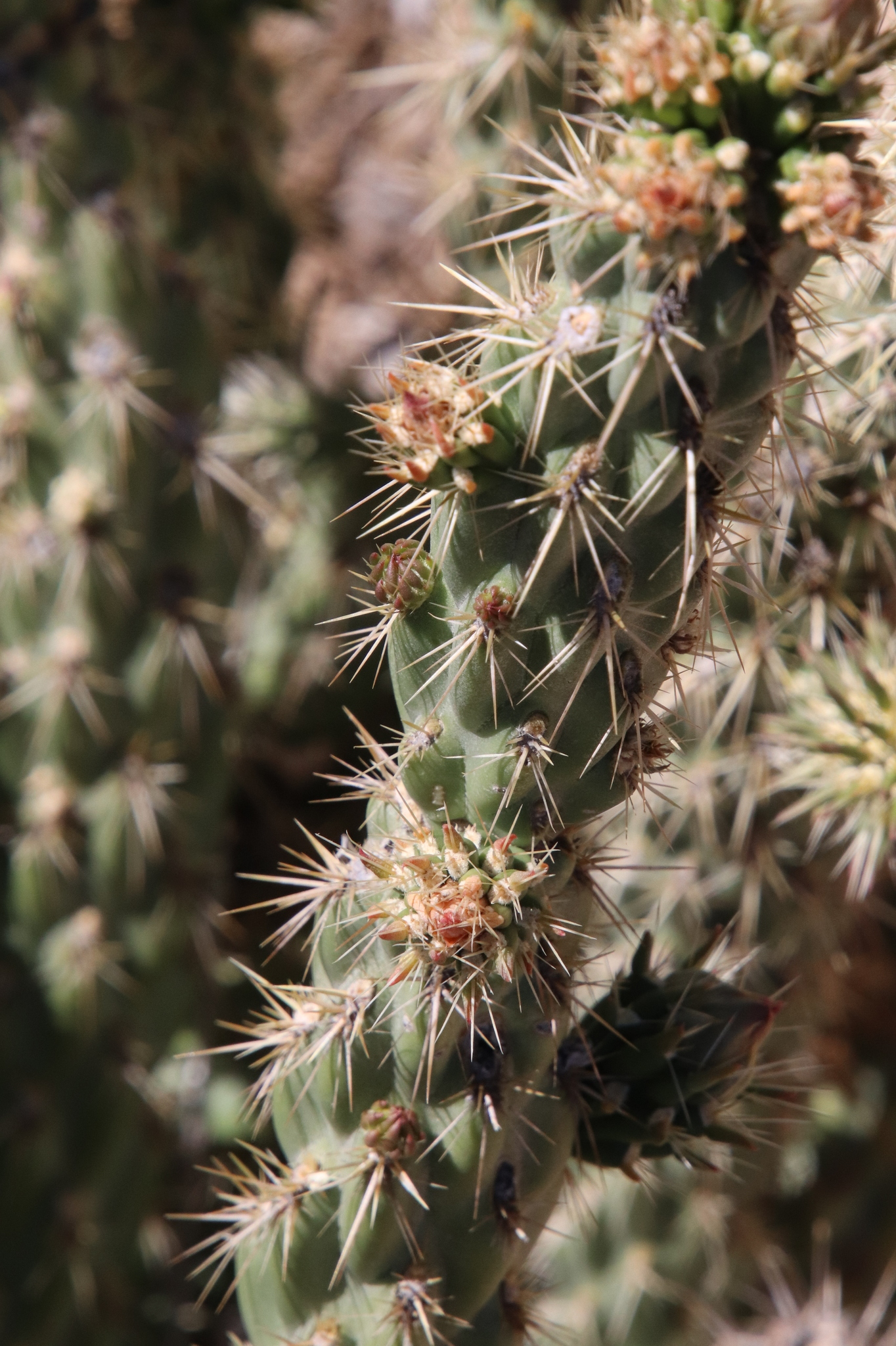
A stem

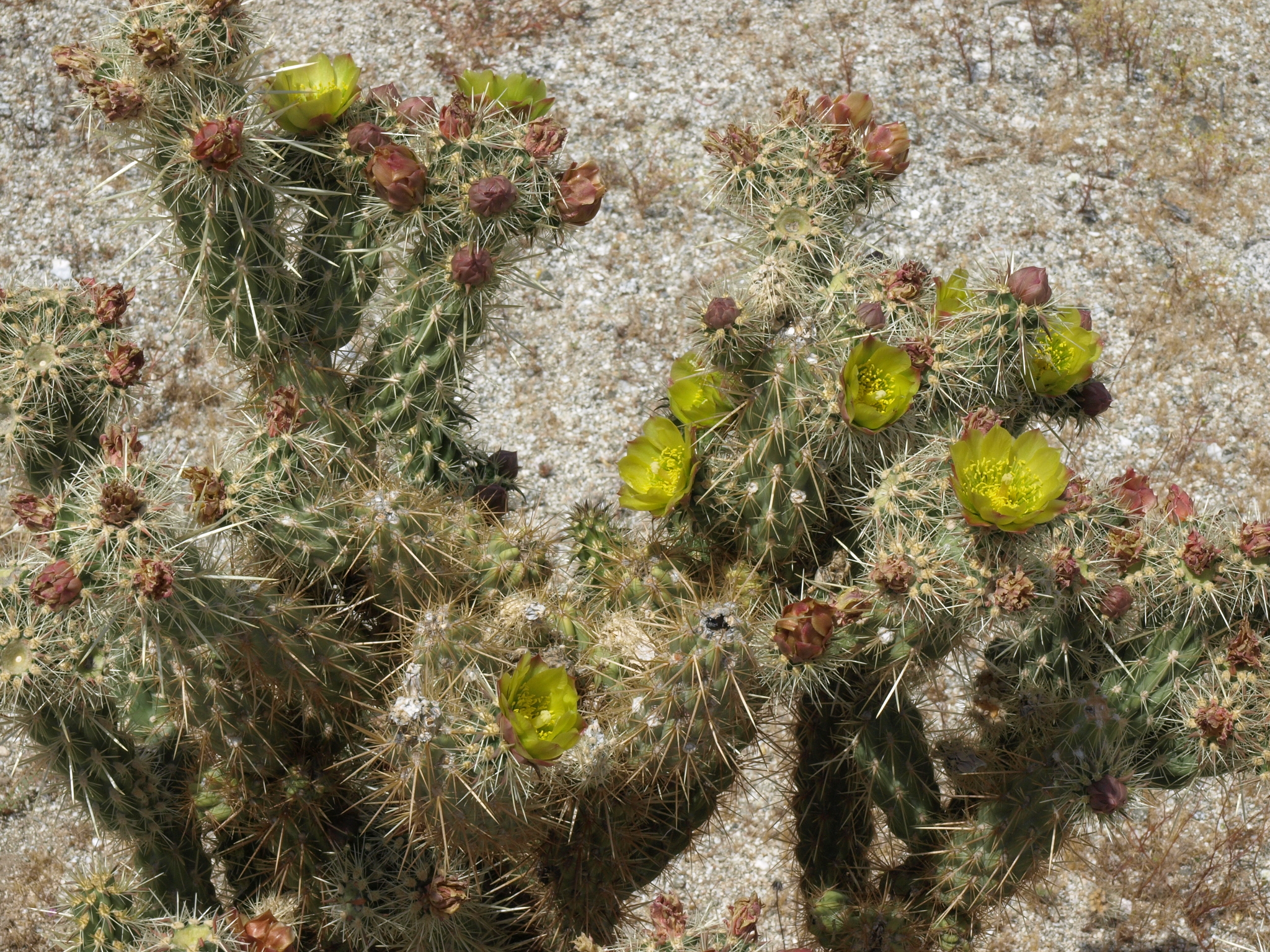
The plant flowering

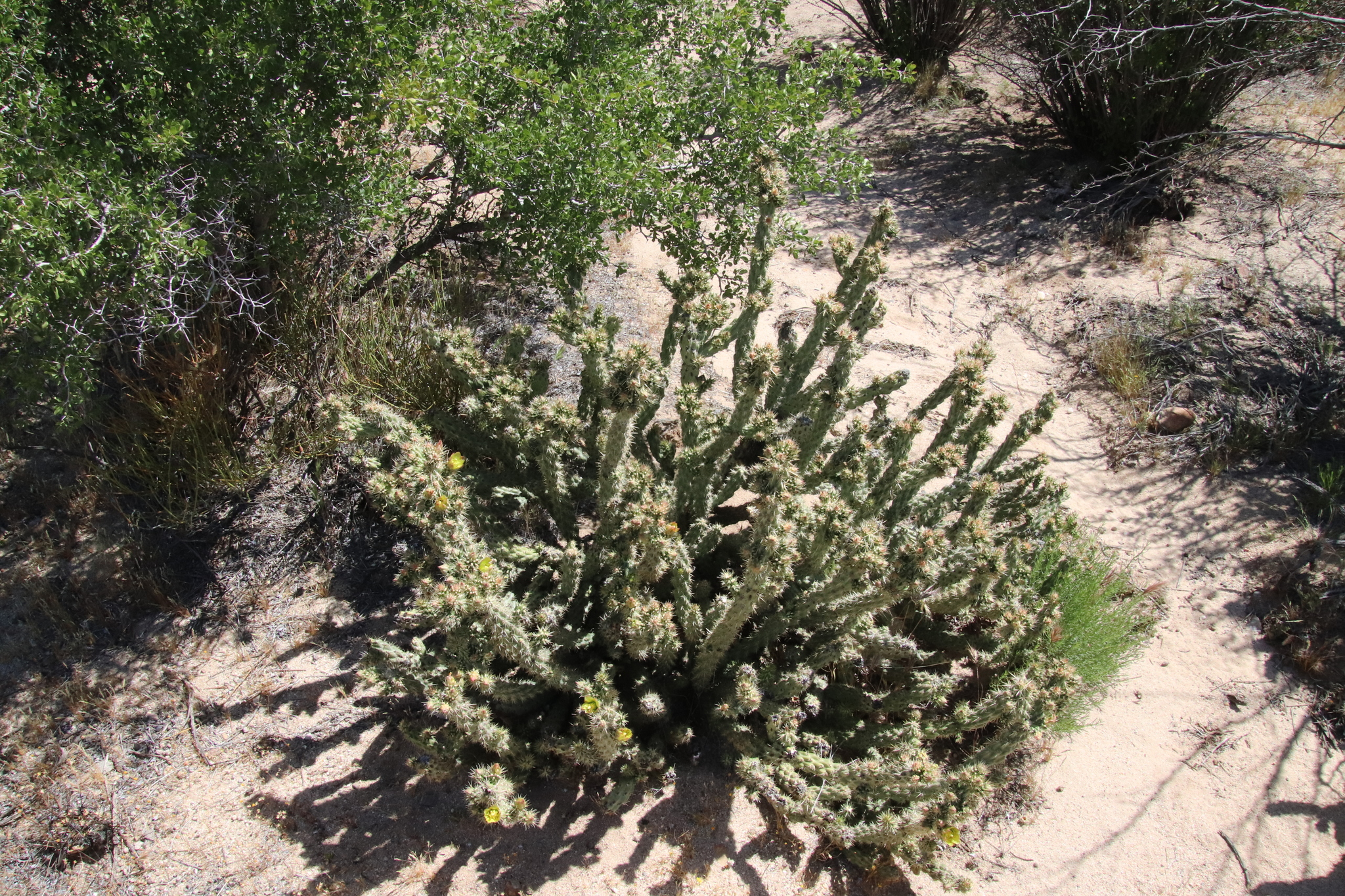
In habitat

== Taxonomy ==
This species was first collected by George Richard Vasey, son of George Vasey, in February 1881, in San Bernardino, California. The National Herbarium erroneously ticketed G.R. Vasey's collections as being from New Mexico. The basionym of this species, Opuntia bernardina, was described by George Engelmann. Subsequent taxonomic changes led to plants of this species undergoing numerous names, most notably as Cylindropuntia californica var. parkeri. In 2018, genetic analysis placed plants of this species closer to Cylindropuntia ganderi than to Cylindropuntia californica var. californica. This species also integrades with C. ganderi and C. echinocarpa.

== Distribution and habitat ==
This species is distributed across southern California in the United States and northwestern Baja California in Mexico. It occurs from the Cuyama River, south through the Transverse Ranges and the Peninsular Ranges, reaching its southern extent in the Sierra de San Pedro Martir. Plants of this species are typically found in the chaparral, plains, hills, oak scrub and pinyon-juniper woodlands of the aforementioned mountain ranges and their intervening valleys.
