= Cajon Pass =

Mountain pass in Southern California

- Spanish: Puerto del Cajón, Paso del Cajón
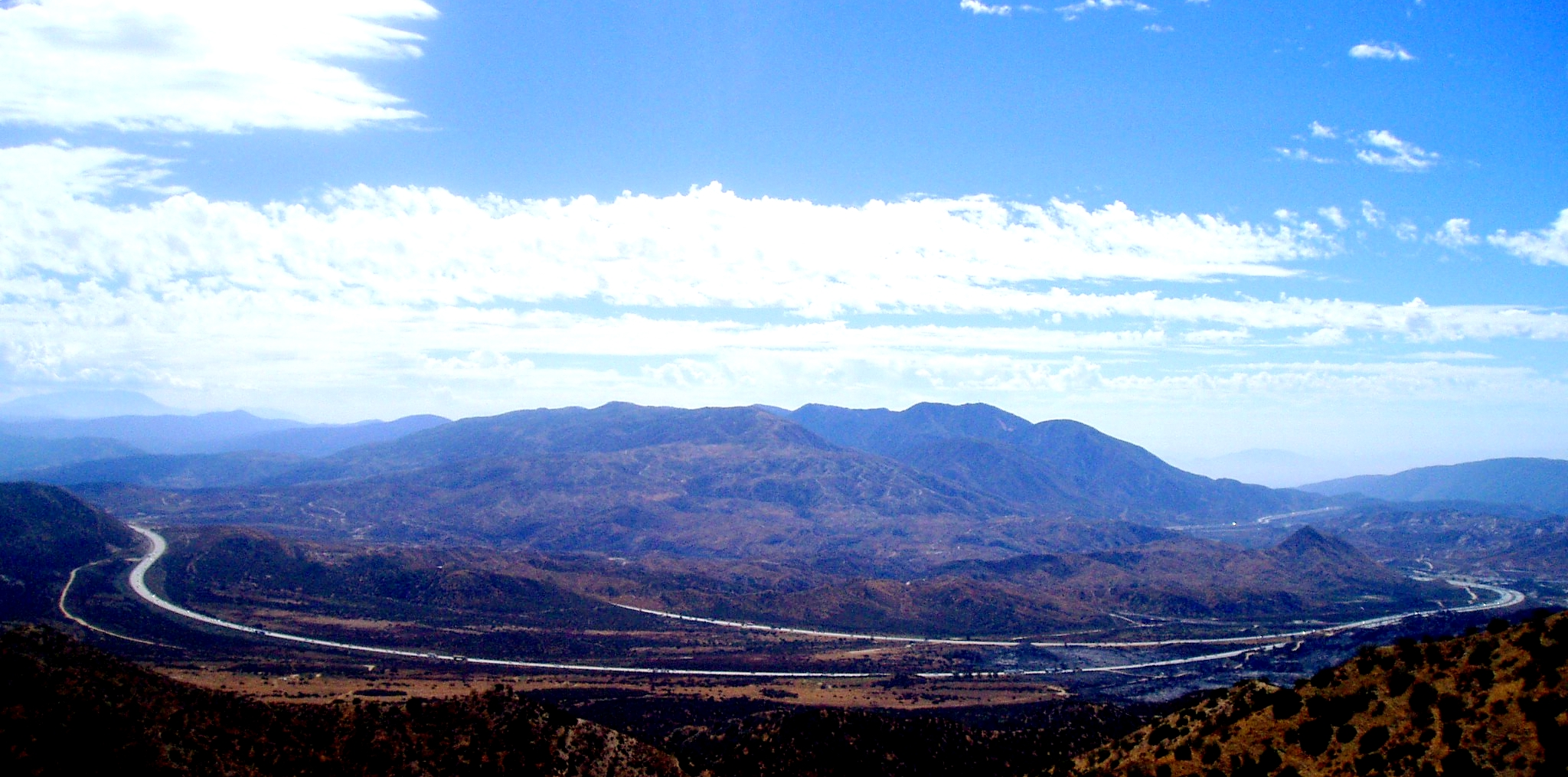
- I-15 passing over Cajon Summit

- Location within southern California Location within California
- Elevation: 3,777 ft (1,151 m)
- Traversed by: SR 138; US 66 (from 1926-1979); US 91 (until 1974); US 395 (until 1979); Union Pacific Railroad/BNSF Railway/Amtrak; I-15 (indirectly)

Location
- Location: San Bernardino County, California, United States
- Range: San Bernardino Mountains; San Gabriel Mountains
- Coordinates: 34°19′33″N 117°25′42″W

Cajon Pass (/kəˈhoʊn/; Spanish: Puerto del Cajón or Paso del Cajón) is a mountain pass between the San Bernardino Mountains to the east and the San Gabriel Mountains to the west in Southern California. Created by the movements of the San Andreas Fault, it has an elevation of 3,777 ft (1,151 m). Located in the Mojave Desert, the pass is an important link from the Greater San Bernardino Area to the Victor Valley, and northeast to Las Vegas. The Cajon Pass area is on the Pacific Crest Trail.

Cajon Pass is at the head of Horsethief Canyon, traversed by California State Route 138 (SR 138) and railroad tracks owned by BNSF Railway and Union Pacific Railroad. Improvements in 1972 reduced the railroad's maximum elevation from about 3,829 to 3,777 feet (1,167 to 1,151 m) while reducing curvature. Interstate 15 does not traverse Cajon Pass, but rather the nearby Cajon Summit, 34°20′58″N 117°26′47″W. The entire area, Cajon Pass and Cajon Summit, is often referred to as Cajon Pass, but a distinction is made between Cajon Pass and Cajon Summit.

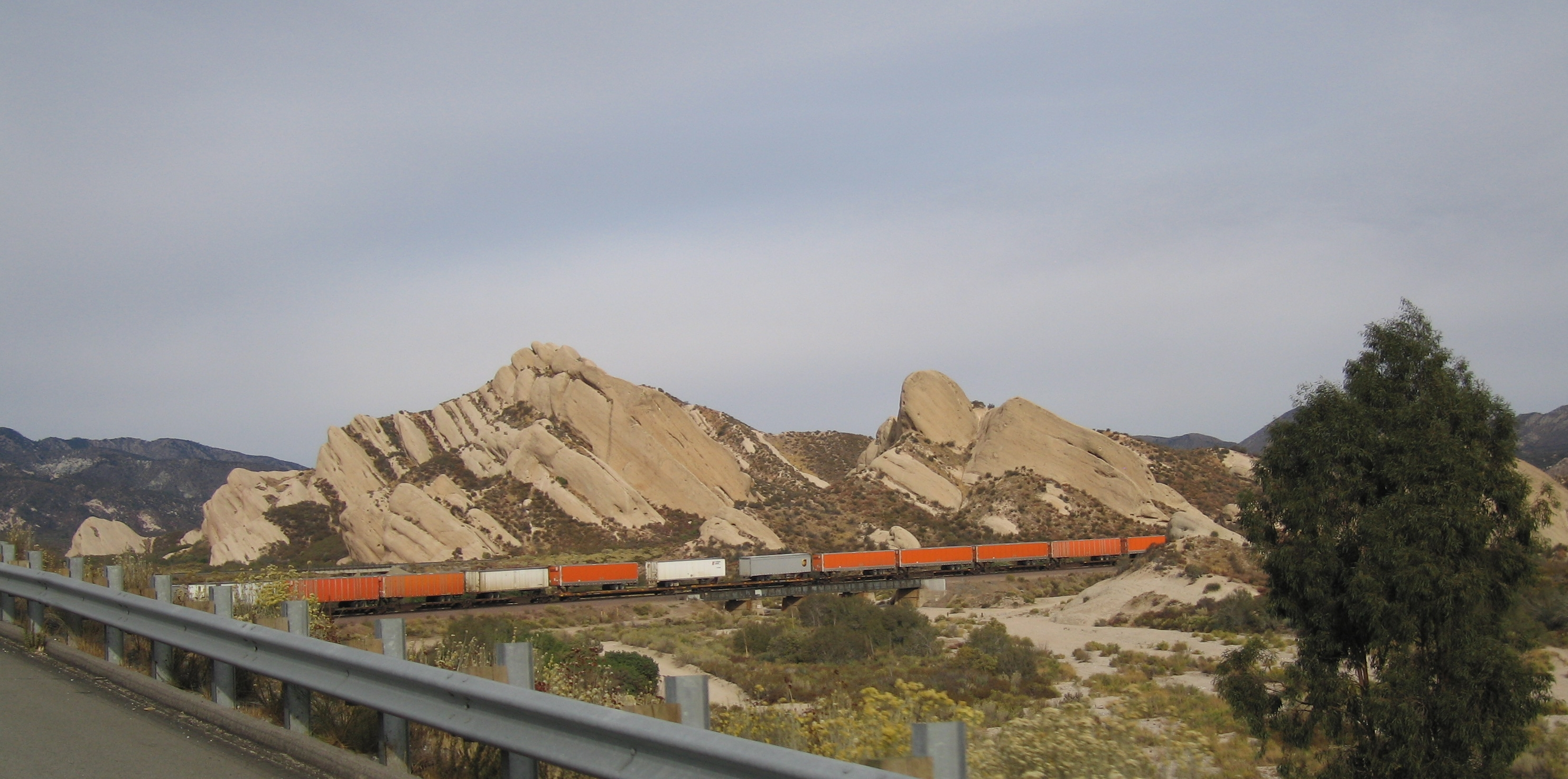
A freight train passing in front of Mormon Rocks

In 1851, a group of Mormon settlers led by Amasa M. Lyman and Charles C. Rich traveled through Cajon Pass in covered wagons on their way from Salt Lake City to southern California, where they established Fort San Bernardino. A prominent rock formation in the pass, where the Mormon Road and the railway merge (at 34.3184°N 117.4920°W, near Sullivan's Curve), is known as Mormon Rocks.

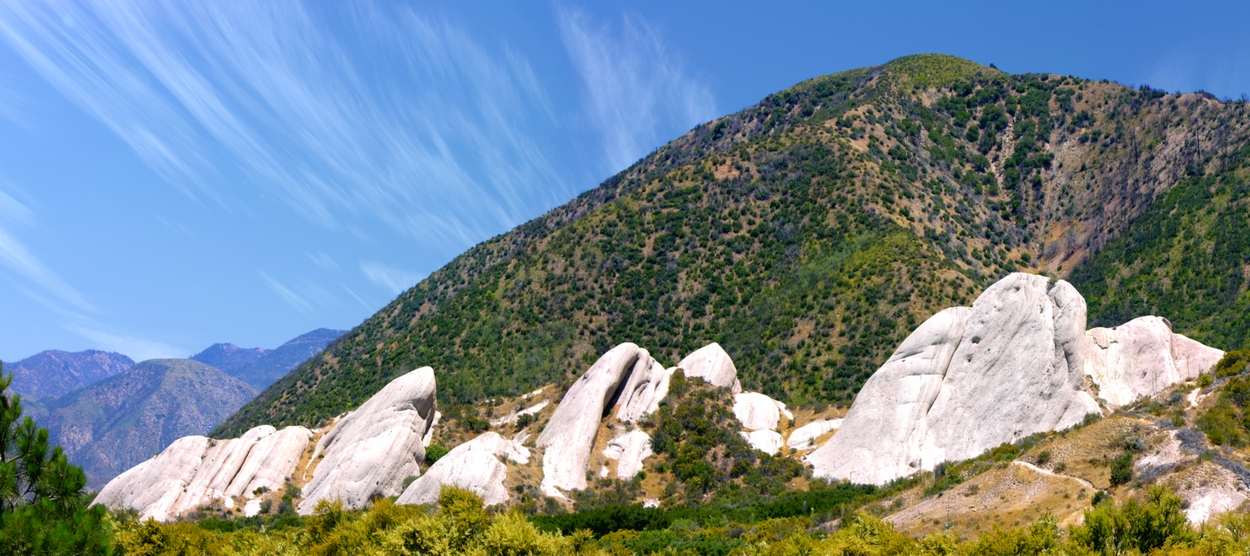
Near the State Route 138 and Interstate 15 junction, the Mormon Rocks are evidence of the San Andreas fault beneath the surface.

== Name ==
In Spanish, the word cajón refers to a box or drawer. The name of the pass is derived from the Spanish land grant encompassing the area; it was first referred to in English on an 1852 map. Early Latter-day Saint documents, which often referred to the pass as "Cahoon Pass", suggest an alternate explanation for the name, that it is named in honor of Mormon pioneer Andrew Cahoon (pronounced similarly to Cajon), who was an early settler in nearby San Bernardino and assisted in surveying and laying out the city of San Bernardino.

== Aviation ==
Cajon Pass is known for high wind, turbulence and fog. The weather over the pass can vary from foggy days with poor visibility to clear afternoons where aircraft are bounced by gusting Santa Ana winds that top 80 mph (130 km/h). The wind is typically from the west, although in Santa Ana and other weather conditions it may be out of the north or the southeast. Air spilling over the San Gabriels can cause violent up- and downdrafts. On a normal day, with the wind out of the west, turbulence usually starts a few miles west of Rialto and continues a few miles to the east, growing in strength above the altitude of the mountains and especially over the pass near the HITOP intersection. In Santa Ana conditions, up- and downdrafts can become violent northeast of Ontario Airport, and turbulence can be experienced east to the Banning Pass, well known for turbulence. The mass and wing loading of an aircraft determine its sensitivity to turbulence, so what may seem violent in a Cessna 172 may seem only mild to moderate in a Boeing 747. In the 2006 Mercy Air 2 accident, an air ambulance helicopter collided with mountainous terrain near the pass in foggy weather.

== Rail transport ==
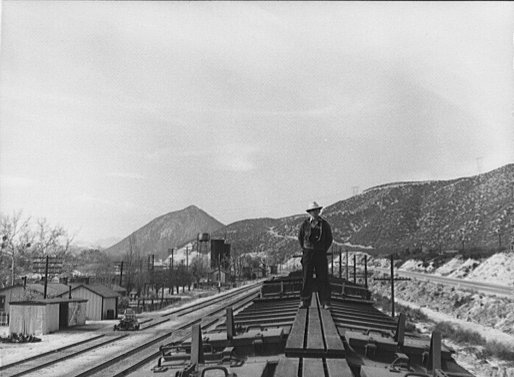
Santa Fe Railway brakeman atop a train that has paused at Cajon siding to cool its brakes after descending Cajon Pass in March 1943

=== Traffic ===
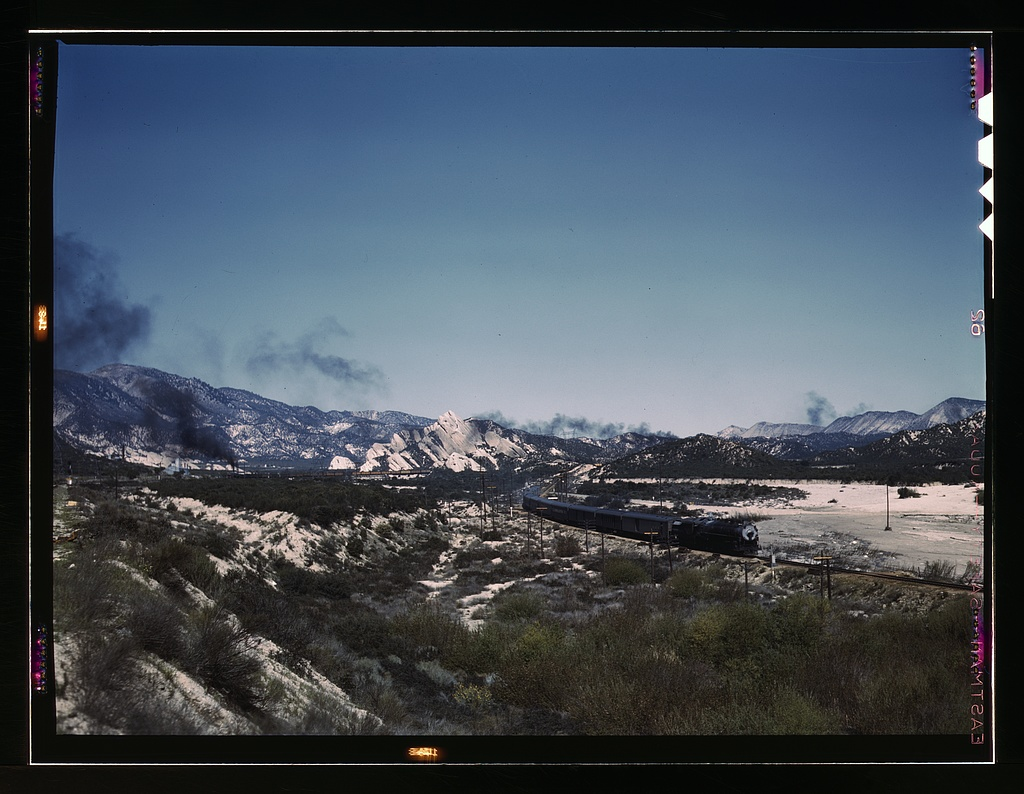
Santa Fe train climbing to Cajon Pass 1943

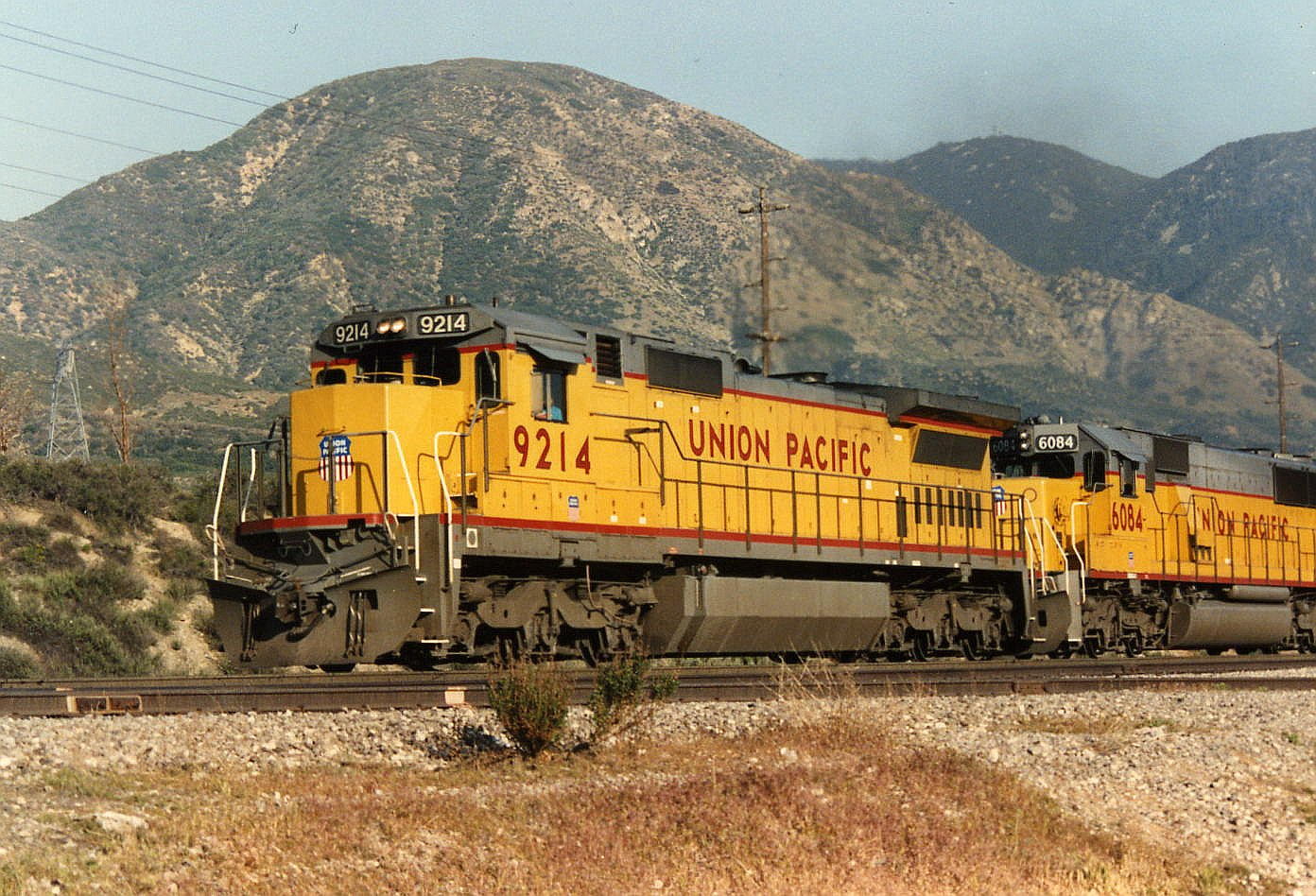
Union Pacific Railroad GE Dash 8-40C #9214 leads a freight train up Cajon Pass.

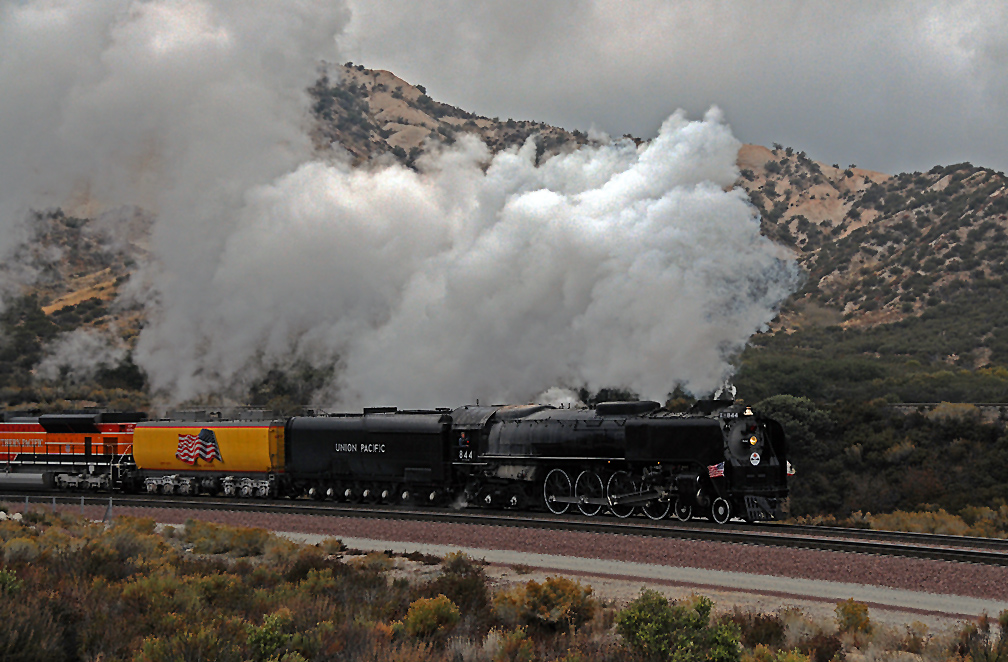
Union Pacific excursion train at Cajon Pass pulled by FEF-3 4-8-4 "Northern" type steam locomotive UP 844

The California Southern Railroad, a subsidiary of the Atchison, Topeka and Santa Fe Railway, was the first railroad through Cajon Pass. The line through the pass was built in the early 1880s to connect the present day cities of Barstow and San Diego. Today the Union Pacific Railroad and BNSF Railway (the successor to the Santa Fe) use the pass to reach Los Angeles and San Bernardino as part of the Southern Transcon. Due to the many trains, scenery and easy access, it is a popular location for railfans, and many photographs of trains on Cajon Pass appear in books and magazines.

The Union Pacific Railroad and the BNSF Railway share track rights through the pass ever since the Union Pacific gained track rights on the Santa Fe portion negotiated under the original Los Angeles and Salt Lake Railroad.

The Union Pacific Railroad owns one track through the pass, on the previous Southern Pacific Railroad Palmdale cutoff, opened in 1967. It is single-tracked with sidings.

The BNSF Railway owns three tracks; built in the 1880s, 1913 and 2008, respectively. Roads such as U.S. Route 66 and I-15, as well as the planned Brightline West line to Las Vegas, roughly follow the original BNSF (ATSF) track. The 3.0% grade for a few miles on the south track is challenging for long trains, making the westbound descent dangerous, as a runaway can occur if the engineer is not careful in handling the brakes. The second track, built in 1913, is 2 miles (3.2 km) longer to get a lower 2.2% grade. This track has since been extended with another track, for three BNSF tracks in total. The 1913 track ran through two short tunnels; these were removed (replaced by open cuts) when the new track was added. Trains may be seen traveling at speeds of 60 and 70 mph (97 and 113 km/h) on the straighter track away from the pass, but typically ascend at 14 to 22 mph (23 to 35 km/h) and descend at 20 to 30 mph (32 to 48 km/h). With the third track, the BNSF line have a capacity of 150 trains per day.

=== Recent Incidents ===
- On the night of April 6, 1974, a Union Pacific freight train led by UP DDA40X's 6903 and 6924 ran into the rear of a standing Atchison, Topeka & Santa Fe train, killing the UP brakeman and injuring the UP conductor and Santa Fe crew, 6903 was scrapped in June 1974, whereas 6924 was repaired and returned to service.
- The steep downhill grade south of the pass was a contributing factor in the May 12, 1989, San Bernardino train disaster.
- Cajon Pass was the site of a major accident on December 14, 1994, when a westbound Atchison, Topeka & Santa Fe intermodal train lost control and crashed into the rear of a westbound Union Pacific coal train just below California Highway 138, between Alray and Cajon. Thankfully, the Santa Fe crew warned the Union Pacific crew ahead of time, and the UP crew on the helper locomotives at the back of their train bailed out and were uninjured, while the Santa Fe crew received minor injuries after bailing out in turn before impact. All of the Santa Fe and UP helper locomotives involved in the collision suffered irreparable damage and were scrapped, while the lead UP locomotives were undamaged.
- On February 1, 1996, a brakeman and a conductor were killed when a Santa Fe manifest train derailed and caught fire at Cajon Pass. The accident caused nearby highways to be shut down for days along with locals living nearby being ordered to evacuate due to the toxic fumes being released from some tanker cars.
- On August 16, 2016, the Blue Cut Fire destroyed a trestle on the Union Pacific mainline.
- On August 21, 2018, a train carrying hazardous materials derailed, causing a FedEx facility near the tracks to evacuate, along with one school that took shelter.

=== Passenger service ===
Amtrak's Desert Wind used the pass until it quit running in 1997. The Southwest Chief runs daily between Chicago and Los Angeles, through Cajon Pass on the BNSF line.

As of 2024, the Brightline West high-speed rail line is currently under construction in Cajon Pass as part of its route between Rancho Cucamonga and Las Vegas. The route will follow the existing I-15 right-of-way.

== Road transport ==
The Mojave Freeway (I-15) was built in 1969 over Cajon Summit west of Cajon Pass. It is a major route from Los Angeles and the Inland Empire to Las Vegas. The freeway runs above and parallel to an original stretch of U.S. Route 66 and U.S. Route 395. This stretch, now known as Cajon Boulevard, is a short, well-preserved fragment dating to a rerouting and widening of the highway in the early 1950s. Only the southbound/westbound lanes are in use; the northbound/eastbound lanes and corresponding bridges are closed to through traffic. It is along this stretch of road, accessible via either the Kenwood Avenue or Cleghorn Road exits that some of the best trainspotting areas are found. The Cajon Pass segment of I-15 was named the deadliest road in California.

The historic Summit Inn, off the Oak Hills exit at the summit of the pass, was a historic Route 66 diner and was in the same location from 1952 to 2016, when it was destroyed by the Blue Cut fire. Some maps may show the Cajon Pass as a feature on SR 138, which crosses I-15 south of the summit between West Cajon Valley and Summit Valley. The highest point on I-15 between Los Angeles and Victorville is thus sometimes identified as Cajon Summit. However, the entire area, including Cajon Summit, is often called Cajon Pass.

== Pacific Crest Trail ==
The Pacific Crest Trail goes through the Cajon Pass area, and during the hiking season up to several thousand thru-hikers will pass through this area after walking one of the hottest, driest, and most grueling sections of desert on the trail. A nearby McDonald's restaurant happens to be very close to the trail, and it is famous among hikers. Many hikers also spend the night in the motel at Cajon Junction.

== Utilities infrastructure ==
Three Southern California Edison 500 kV high voltage power lines cross the summit. These lines head to the Lugo substation northeast of Cajon Pass and connect to Path 26 and Path 46. Both Path 26 and 46 provide the Los Angeles metro area with electricity generated from fossil fuel power plants in the Four Corners region, and hydroelectric dams along the Colorado River.

== Natural hazards ==
During October and November 2003, a number of wildfires devastated the hills and mountainsides near and around the pass, forcing the closure of Interstate 15. The following winter, rains in addition to burnt vegetation caused a number of landslides to further close the freeway pass.

On July 17, 2015, during severe drought conditions plaguing the whole state and creating extreme fire hazards, a fast, wind-whipped wildfire swept over Interstate 15 between California State Route 138 and the Oak Hill Road exits, sending drivers running for safety and setting 20 vehicles ablaze, officials said. The vegetation fire, which closed the I-15 southbound lanes and restricted the northbound side to one lane, overtook stalled cars.

The following year the Blue Cut Fire again forced the closure of the freeway for several days starting on August 16, 2016. The fire closed the I-15 north and southbound lanes due to the intensity of the fire. It destroyed a number of outbuildings and homes, and destroyed the Summit Inn Restaurant in Oak Hills. A McDonald's restaurant was also burned but the damage was minor. The fire threatened homes in Lytle Creek, Phelan, Oak Hills and Wrightwood and burned 37,000 acres (15,000 ha).

Cajon Pass is notorious for high winds, particularly during Santa Ana wind season, with gusts of wind up to 60 miles per hour (97 km/h). It has been known to cause high-profile vehicles such as semi-trucks to lose control or tip over. During wind advisories, Caltrans will use its Changeable message signs to warn motorists of dangerous weather in the Cajon Pass.

Cajon Pass gets snow occasionally, usually not enough to cause closures. When any closure is total, California Highway Patrols often provide escorts through the pass as the Interstate 15 is a major artery for the High Desert region.

When there is high wind or snow in the Cajon Pass, it is fairly common for weather forecasters or reporters from Los Angeles television stations to do location reports from the Cajon Pass.

The San Andreas Fault passes through the Cajon Pass (crossing I-15 on the south side of the summit) and is responsible for the unique local geography. Instrumentation installed at Cajon Pass allows scientists to track earthquakes in the region.

A scientific study reported in June 2026 that the Cajon Pass, or 'earthquake gate,' is experiencing severe, aligned stress. This could allow a rupture to cascade across both the San Andreas and San Jacinto fault systems, which have reached their highest tectonic stress levels in 1,000 years, significantly increasing the probability of a massive, multi-fault earthquake.

== See also ==
- Tejon Pass
- Harry Wade Exit Route, a 49er path out of Death Valley to Cajon Pass
- Santa Fe And Salt Lake Trail Monument
- Lost Lake (Southern California)
