= Cahuilla Mountain Wilderness =

Protected wilderness area in California, United States

- IUCN category Ib (wilderness area)
- Location within California Location within the United States
- Location: Riverside County, California, USA
- Nearest city: Hemet, California
- Coordinates: 33°34′36″N 116°47′31″W
- Area: 5,575 acres (2,256 ha)
- Established: 2009
- Governing body: United States Forest Service

The Cahuilla Mountain Wilderness is a federally designated wilderness area located in Riverside County in Southern California. The 5,575 acres (2,256 ha) wilderness is managed by the United States Forest Service in the San Bernardino National Forest. The summit of Cahuilla Mountain sits at 5604 feet (1708 m) and provides an excellent view of the nearby Juan Bautista de Anza National Historic Trail. A trail to the top winds through the chaparral, as well as groves of live oak and Jeffrey pine. Local wildlife include mountain lion, mountain and California quail, and the rare red diamond rattlesnake.

== See also ==
- Cahuilla Band of Mission Indians of the Cahuilla Reservation
- List of U.S. Wilderness Areas
