= Summit Inn =

Historic U.S. Route 66 roadside diner

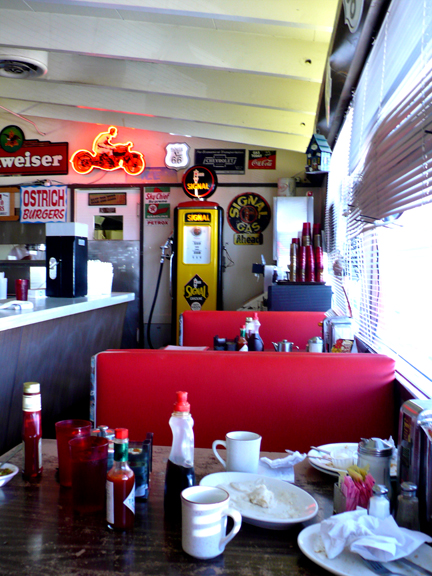
- A booth inside the Summit Inn
- Interactive map of the Summit Inn area

General information
- Location: 5970 Mariposa Road, Oak Hills, California, United States of America
- Coordinates: 34.3591°N 117.4352°W
- Elevation: 4,260 feet (1,300 m)
- Opened: 1952
- Demolished: 2016
- Owner: Katherine Juarez and Otto Recinos

Technical details
- Floor count: 1

Design and construction
- Main contractor: Burton and Dorothy Riley

Other information
- Parking: on-site

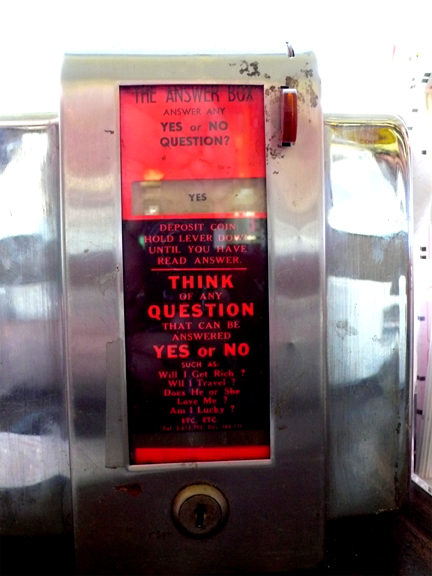
The "Answer Box," an antique coin-operated fortune-telling machine

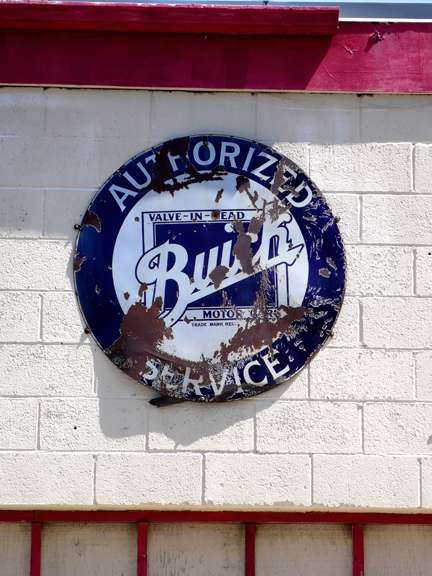
Antique automotive service sign on the old Texaco garage

The Summit Inn was a historic U.S. Route 66 roadside diner built in 1952, located at the summit of Cajon Pass in San Bernardino County, California. The building was destroyed by the Blue Cut Fire on August 16, 2016.

== History ==
The original Summit Inn was in operation in 1928 and takes its name from its original location at the summit of the Cajon Pass between the westbound and eastbound lanes of US 66.

The present location in unincorporated Oak Hills, California, had been in operation since 1952 when 66 was rerouted along a somewhat lower elevation. 1953-era postcards depict a Horseless Carriage Rally at the Summit Inn which included vintage Ford Model T's.

Cecil “C.A.” Stevens bought the station and restaurant from original builder Burt Riley in 1966; he'd wanted just the Texaco filling station on the site but agreed to buy both if Hilda Fish, a German woman who ran the restaurant, were willing to stay to run the place. Hilda Fish retired in 2002 and had died by 2012. Stevens died in 2021.

Route 66 in the area was obliterated by Interstate 15 in California by 1970.

On March 27, 2014, an intoxicated driver, Jayson Ernest Johnson of Riverside, California, was arrested for crashing a stolen van into the restaurant, causing $200,000 in damage. The driver pled guilty to a lesser charge and received a suspended sentence. The entire kitchen was rebuilt using an insurance payout and the restaurant re-opened at the end of July 2014. The vintage building which once served as a Texaco station remained on the property, although gasoline was no longer sold there. The Summit Inn's small gift shop still sold Texaco-related memorabilia and a great many original metal oil company signs decorated the rest of the interior. Other signs included two circa 1939 Standard Oil signs featuring Mickey Mouse and a genuine reflectorized US 66 highway shield.

Notable clients included Elvis Presley (who kicked the jukebox as it had none of his records at the time – an oversight soon fixed – and left without eating), actor Pierce Brosnan, Pearl Bailey, Clint Eastwood and Danny Thomas.

=== 2016 fire ===
On August 16, 2016, the diner was destroyed by the Blue Cut Fire, just one month after Stevens retired and sold the inn. At the time, the new owners of the business planned to rebuild, but as of February 2021 the cost of removing lead and asbestos from the ruins has prevented any progress.

== Business model ==
The menu at the Summit Inn was typical, inexpensive and satisfying roadside fare, but with a twist: Ostrich and buffalo products were also served, including an ostrich egg omelette and "buffalo burgers."

During the restaurant's operating hours, the original red neon "SUMMIT INN" sign flashed on and off to beckon drivers on present-day Interstate 15. Antique cars could occasionally be spotted in the parking lot.
