= Blue Cut Fire =

2016 wildfire in Southern California

- Part of the 2016 California wildfires
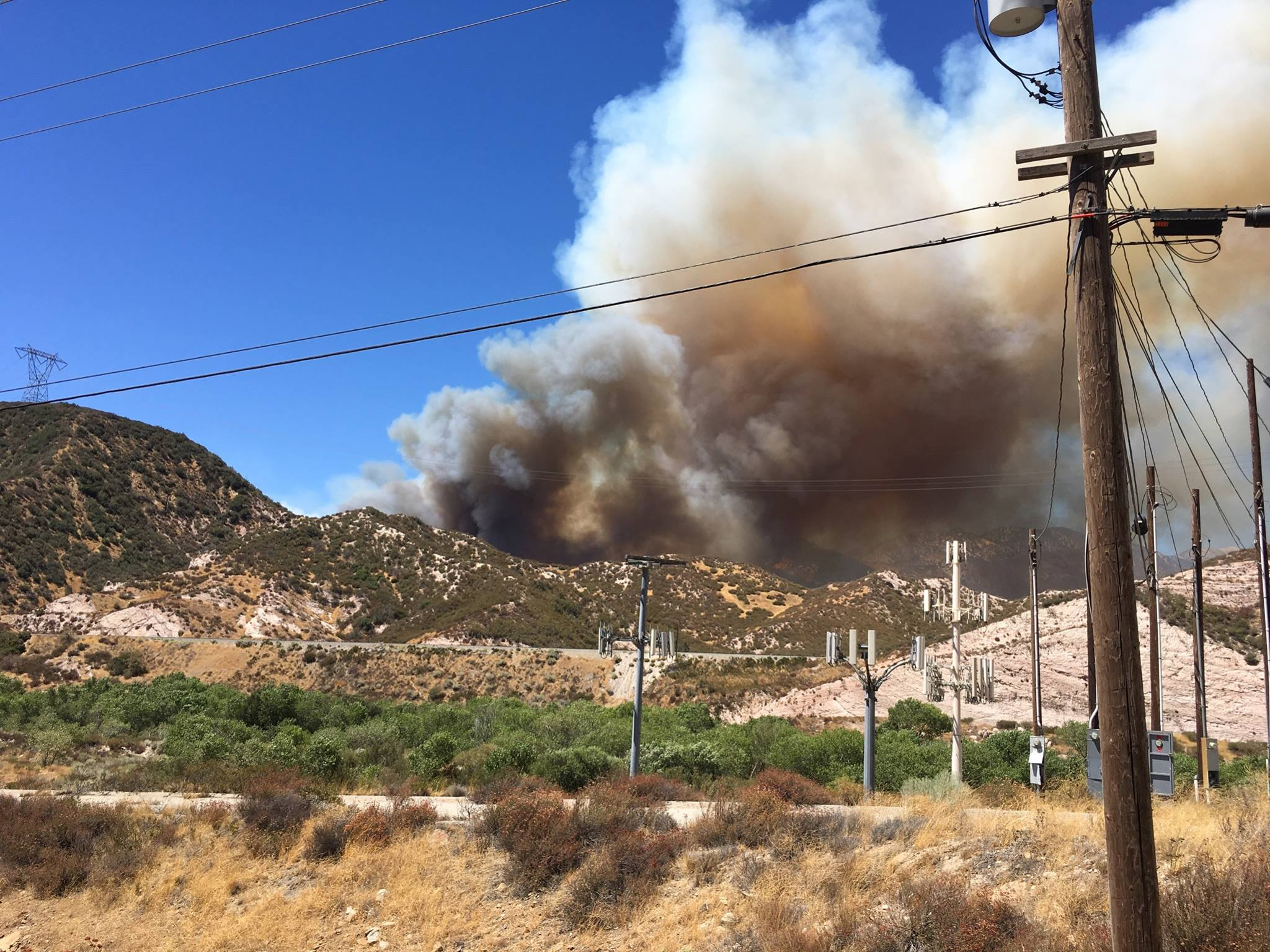
- Smoke rises above the fire on August 17
- Date: August 16, 2016 –; August 23, 2016
- Location: Cajon Pass, San Bernardino County, California
- Coordinates: 34.26763°N 117.456805°W

Statistics
- Burned area: 37,000 acres (14,973 ha)

Impacts
- Structures lost: 105 homes; 213 outbuildings

Ignition
- Cause: Under investigation

Map
- Location in Southern California.

The Blue Cut Fire was a wildfire in the Cajon Pass, northeastern San Gabriel Mountains, and Mojave Desert in San Bernardino County, California. The fire, which began on the Blue Cut hiking trail in the San Bernardino National Forest, was first reported on August 16, 2016 at 10:36 a.m., just west of Interstate 15. A red flag warning was in effect in the area of the fire, with temperatures near 100 °F (38 °C) and winds gusting up to 30 miles per hour (48 km/h).

By August 18, the fire had burned 37,000 acres (57.8 mi^{2}; 149.7 km^{2}) of land and destroyed 105 homes and 213 other structures.

== Fire progression ==
Shortly after the fire broke out, evacuations began to be ordered for the nearby communities of West Cajon Valley, Lytle Creek, Lone Pine Canyon and Swarthout Canyon. By 3:00 p.m. on August 16, less than six hours after the fire started, it had spread westward to over 5,500 acres (2,200 ha), forcing additional mandatory evacuation orders for most of Oak Hills, Phelan and Summit Valley.

Two firefighters were injured and briefly hospitalized on the morning of August 16, 2016 after becoming trapped while protecting homes in Swarthout Canyon.

In a conference on August 17, the incident commander Michael Wakoski, stated that increased wind speeds had caused the fire to spot upwards of a half mile (0.8 km) ahead of itself.

By Thursday, August 18, the fire had grown to over 31,600 acres (49.4 mi^{2}; 127.9 km^{2}) and forced the evacuation of over 82,000 residents. The evacuations affected an estimated 34,500 residences.

On Monday, August 22, fire officials said they had the fire 89% contained. The damaged area had grown to 37,020 acres (57.8 mi^{2}; 149.8 km^{2}).

Fire officials declared that the devastating wildfire was fully contained on Tuesday, August 23. The fire destroyed an estimated 105 homes and 213 other structures in San Bernardino County, and at the time ranked as the 20th most destructive wildfire in state history, according to Daniel Berlant, a spokesman for the California Department of Forestry and Fire Protection.

== Impacts ==
Due to the rapid growth and spread of the fire, fire officials ordered mandatory evacuations for over 82,000 residents in surrounding communities, including Wrightwood. The Summit Inn, a historic U.S. Route 66 roadside diner built in 1952, was destroyed by the fire.

On Tuesday, August 16, 2016, Caltrans closed Interstate 15 through the Cajon Pass. This Interstate serves as the main route between Los Angeles and Las Vegas, Nevada.

Ten of the buildings belonging to the Thanksgiving Korean Church retreat in Phelan were destroyed by the fire. Another victim of the fire lost 135 of her livestock, and most of her property.

=== System stability of the electric power network ===
As the fire approached a corridor of three 500 kV and two 287 kV transmission lines, 15 line faults in a short period of time occurred. The voltage drops and the disturbed frequency signal led to significant losses of PV generation in the area, the most significant was nearly 1200 MW around 11:45 a.m.

== See also ==
- 2016 California wildfires
- 2011–17 California drought
- Droughts in California
- Fires in San Bernardino National Forest
