= Lost Lake (San Bernardino County, California) =

Lake in San Bernardino County, California

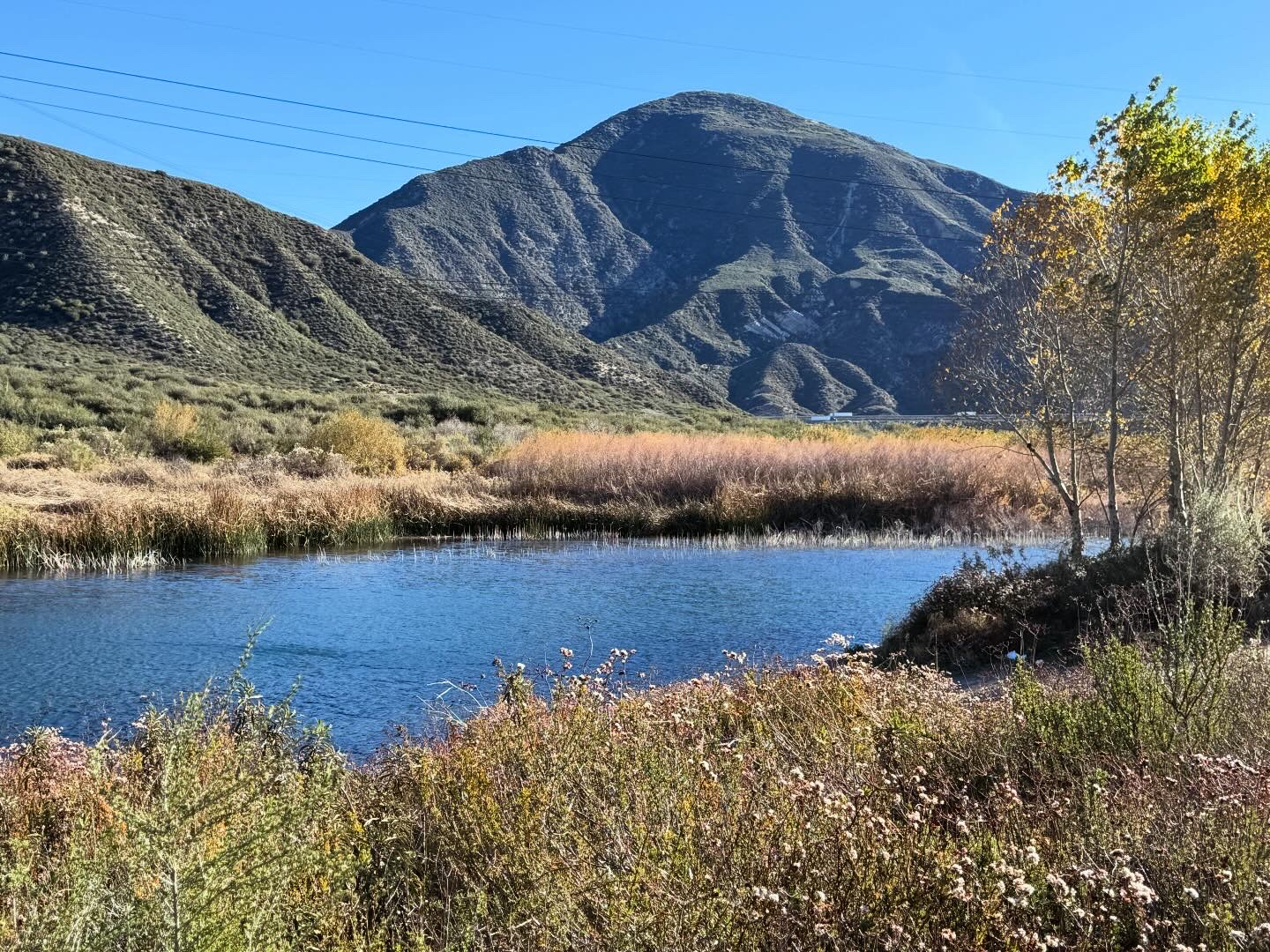
- Lost Lake in 2025
- Interactive map of Lost Lake
- Location: San Bernardino County, California.
- Coordinates: 34.271111°N 117.464167°W
- Type: Sag Pond
- Surface elevation: 2,782 ft (848 m)

Lost Lake is a sag pond in the Cajon Pass located in San Bernardino County, California. It is in the San Andreas Rift Zone at an elevation of 2,782 feet (848 m).

The lake is located in a day-use area in the San Bernardino National Forest on Swarthout Canyon Road. It is a sag pond located on the San Andreas Fault, a strike slip fault that runs the length of California. Sag ponds are created when the fault action creates a depression in the land where rainwater or snowmelt can collect. Sag ponds can also be fed by deep natural springs. The sag pond Lost Lake is a product of groundwater seepage in an area of tectonic depression in the San Andreas Rift Zone, a linear valley in the Lone Pine Canyon.

There is lore associated with sag ponds, including unproven stories about strange creatures or monsters in the water, malformed fish, and stories about the lakes being bottomless or pulling people under the water to their demise.

Recreational opportunities at Lost Lake include picnicking, fishing and hiking.
