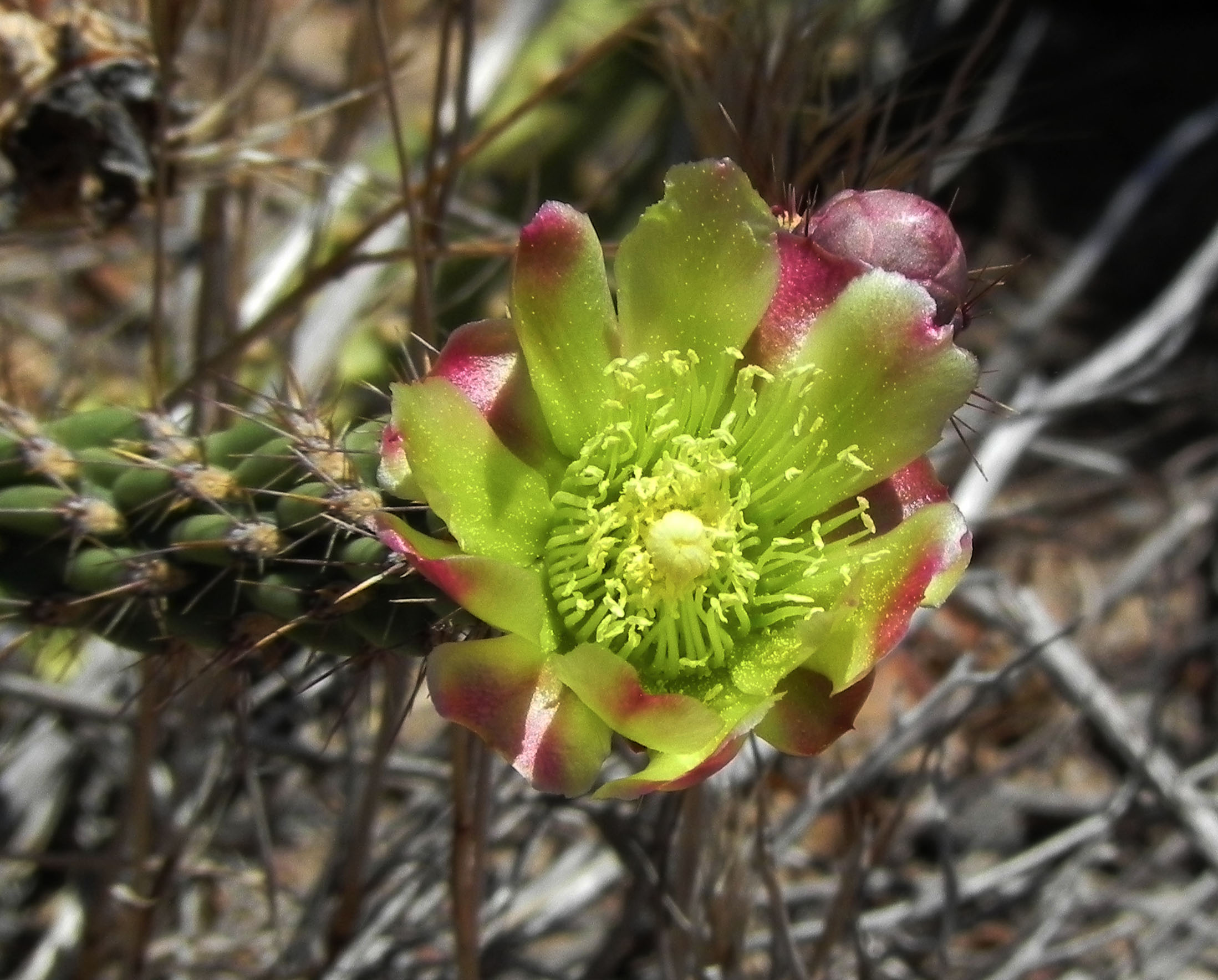

Conservation status
- Imperiled (NatureServe)

Scientific classification
- Kingdom: Plantae
- Clade: Tracheophytes
- Clade: Angiosperms
- Clade: Eudicots
- Order: Caryophyllales
- Family: Cactaceae
- Genus: Cylindropuntia
- Species: C. californica

Binomial name
- Cylindropuntia californica (Torr. & A.Gray) F.M.Knuth

Synonyms
- Cephalocereus californicus (Torr. & A.Gray) K.Schum.; Cereus californicus Torr. & A.Gray; Grusonia californica (Torr. & A.Gray) G.D.Rowley; Opuntia californica (Torr. & A.Gray) Coville; Opuntia parryi var. serpentina (Engelm.) L.D. Benson; Cactus californicus Torr. & A.Gray; Opuntia serpentina Engelm.

= Cylindropuntia californica =

Species of cactus

Cylindropuntia californica is a species of cholla cactus known by the common name snake cholla. It is primarily found in Baja California, Mexico and the southernmost part of California in the United States. It is characterized by a short, decumbent habit, yellow-green flowers, elongated stems, and short spines. It is mostly found in coastal sage scrub and coastal chaparral habitats, but two varieties in Baja California can be found in foothills and deserts. In California, variety californica is regarded as a rare and threatened plant, with a California Native Plant Society listing of 1B.1, in part due to its limited number of occurrences and threats from development. It formerly was considered to have a larger range due to the inclusion of Cylindropuntia bernardina within it as the variety parkeri.

== Description ==
A short, sprawling cactus, this species is typically found growing less than 1.5 m (4.9 ft) high. There are usually several to many trunks, with the main branches and stems usually sprawling along the ground or becoming erect. The terminal segments of the stems are usually less than 25 cm (9.8 in) long and measure 2 to 4 cm (0.79 to 1.57 in) in diameter. The tubercles on the stem measure 7 to 20 mm (0.28 to 0.79 in) and are less than 5 mm (0.20 in) high.

The spines of this cactus are generally less than 2 cm (0.79 in) long, and are colored a yellow to orange-brown. Most species of cholla have paper-like sheath enclosed over their spines. On this species, the sheath is a translucent white to gold-brown. The flower is yellow to yellow-green, and the filaments are green. The fruit is leathery, and may have no spines or many. The seeds are less than 7 mm (0.28 in) long.

== Taxonomy ==
=== Taxonomic history ===
This species was first detailed by English botanist Thomas Nuttall, who arrived in San Diego in May 1836 by ship. He noted the small yellow flowers, numerous clusters of long and short spines, and arid habitat. He sent this description to John Torrey and Asa Gray under the name Cactus californicus.

Variety delgadilloana was originally described in 2001 by Jon Rebman and Donald Pinkava as Cylindropuntia delgadilloana. It is named after the botanist Jose Delgadillo.

Variety rosarica was originally described by George Lindsay in 1942 as Opuntia rosarica, with the type material collected by Lindsay at San Telmo in August 1941.

=== Varieties ===
The infraspecific taxa of Cylindropuntia californica are variously recognized as subspecies or varieties. The list below follows the treatment in the Jepson eFlora and the 2016 Annotated Checklist of the Vascular Plants of Baja California, Mexico produced by the San Diego Natural History Museum.

- Cylindropuntia californica (Torr. & A.Gray) F.M.Knuth var. californica —The autonymic subspecies commonly known as the snake cholla. Found sparsely around San Diego, California and northern Baja California. Chromosome number 2n = 22
- Cylindropuntia californica (Torr. & A.Gray) F.M.Knuth var. delgadilloana (Rebman & Pinkava) Rebman — Commonly known as the Delgadillo cholla. An erect, robust plant with multiple trunks 1 to 2.5 m (3.3 to 8.2 ft) high. The stem segments are 12 to 25 cm (4.7 to 9.8 in) long by 2.5 to 3.5 cm (0.98 to 1.38 in) in diameter. There are 5 to 8 spines per areole, with 1 to 4 central ones and 3 to 5 radial spines. There are sometimes up to 3 sheathless bristle-like spines. The longest central spine is usually deflexed. The flowers are quite large and yellow, and are similar to those on var. rosarica, separating it from var. californica and Cylindropuntia bernardina. It can be distinguished from var. californica and var. rosarica by the notable lack of a long, central spine protruding out of the areole. Flowering is from April to May. Endemic to Baja California, found growing on the eastern side of the Sierra de San Pedro Mártir in the San Felipe Desert.
- Cylindropuntia californica (Torr. & A.Gray) F.M.Knuth var. rosarica (G.E. Linds.) Rebman — Commonly known as the El Rosario cholla. A low and spreading plant, growing up to 1 m (3.3 ft) high with the clumps sometimes reaching 1 m (3.3 ft) in diameter. The stem segments are 10 to 20 cm (3.9 to 7.9 in) long, and 2 to 5 cm (0.79 to 1.97 in) in diameter, colored a blue green to olive green that turns brownish with age. Numerous flowers are produced at the tips of the branches. The flowers measure 4.5 cm (1.8 in) long by 3.5 cm (1.4 in) broad, with up to 14 outer perianth segments and about 10 inner perianth segments. The large, showy flower distinguishes it from var. californica and Cylindropuntia bernardina. The flower is colored a clear yellow with red tinges. Endemic to Baja California, found growing on the western and southwestern foothills of the Sierra de San Pedro Mártir.

Formerly included:

- Cylindropuntia californica var. parkeri — Commonly known as the cane cholla. Found at elevations of 700–1,900 metres (2,300–6,200 ft); Transverse Ranges, Peninsular Ranges, Colorado Desert-chaparral ecotone; northern Baja California. Now regarded by most sources as a separate species, Cylindropuntia bernardina, after phylogenetic analysis. It is more closely related to Cylindropuntia ganderi than to C. californica.

== Distribution and habitat ==
All three varieties of this species are found in Baja California, Mexico, with var. california only found in the United States in southern San Diego County. Variety californica is usually found in sandy soils and sandy loams of slopes and valleys, typically in coastal sage scrub and coastal chaparral, at elevations of between 30 and 150 m (98 and 492 ft). The other two varieties in Baja California have more inland distributions, including one in the San Felipe Desert and one on the western slope of the Sierra de San Pedro Mártir.

== Gallery ==
Cylindropuntia californica var. californica

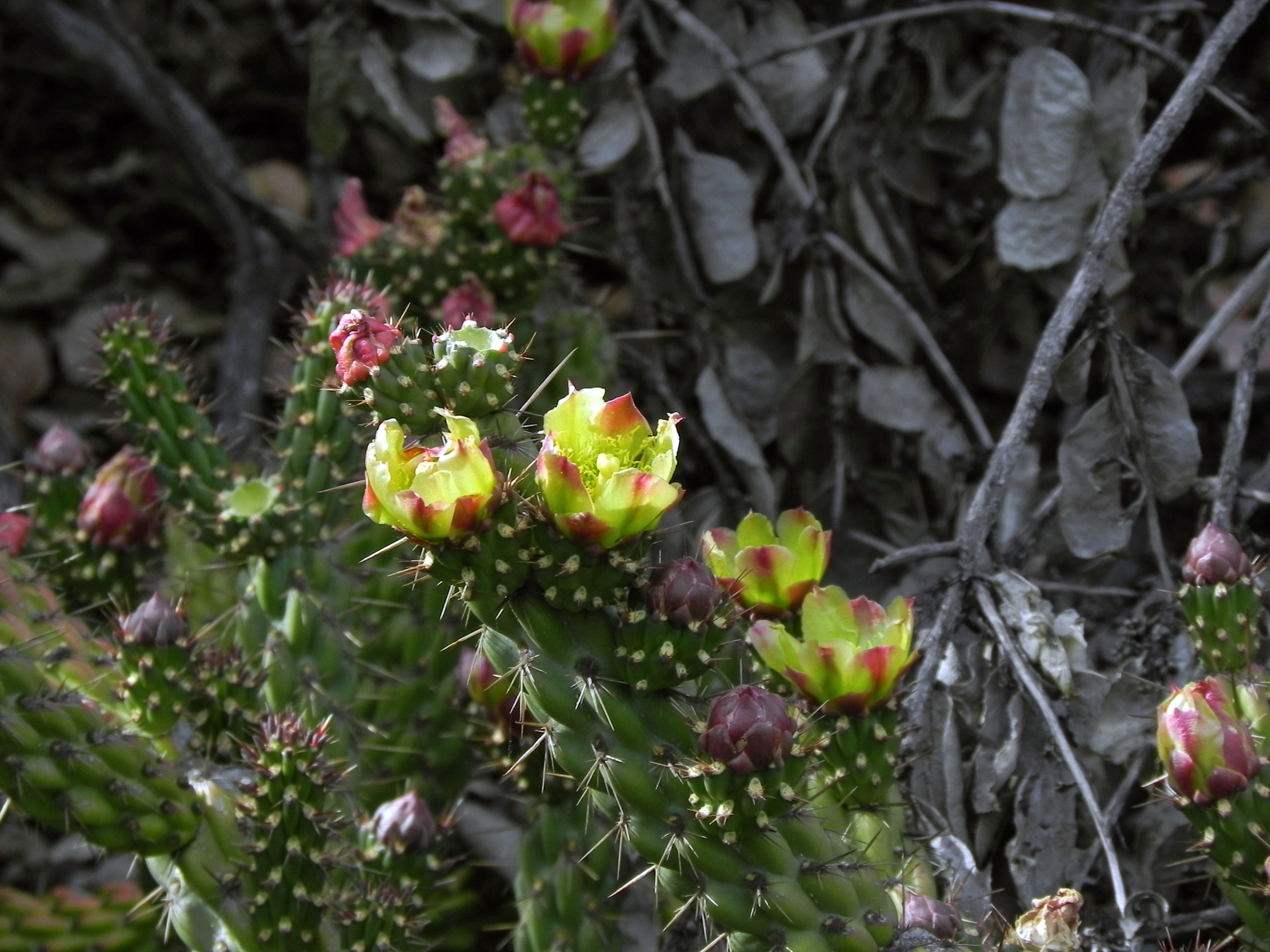
Variety californica flowering in habitat. Dry leaves of Rhus integrifolia in the background.

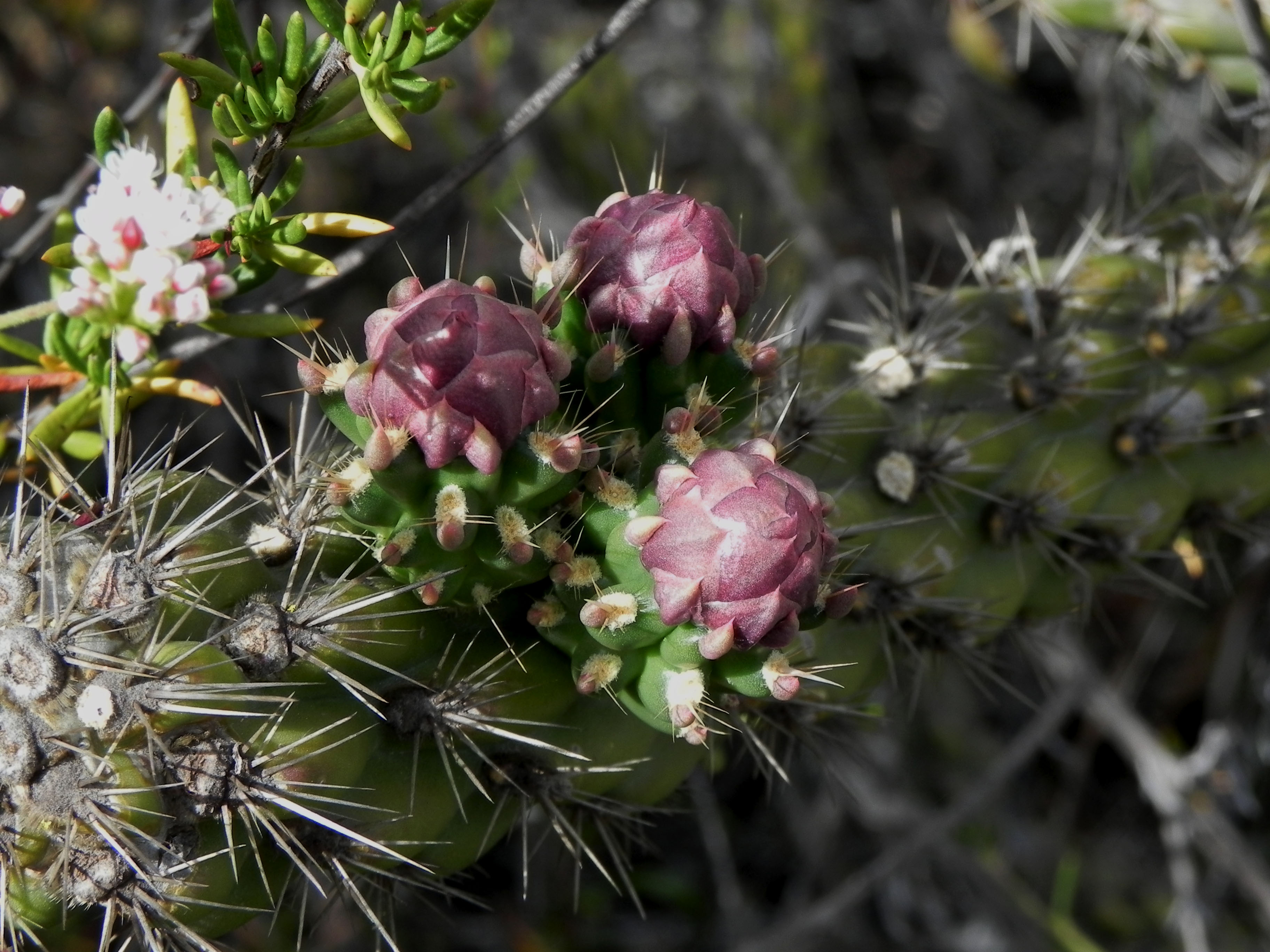
Detail of the buds and spines of var. californica. Eriogonum fasciculatum is the flower at the top left.

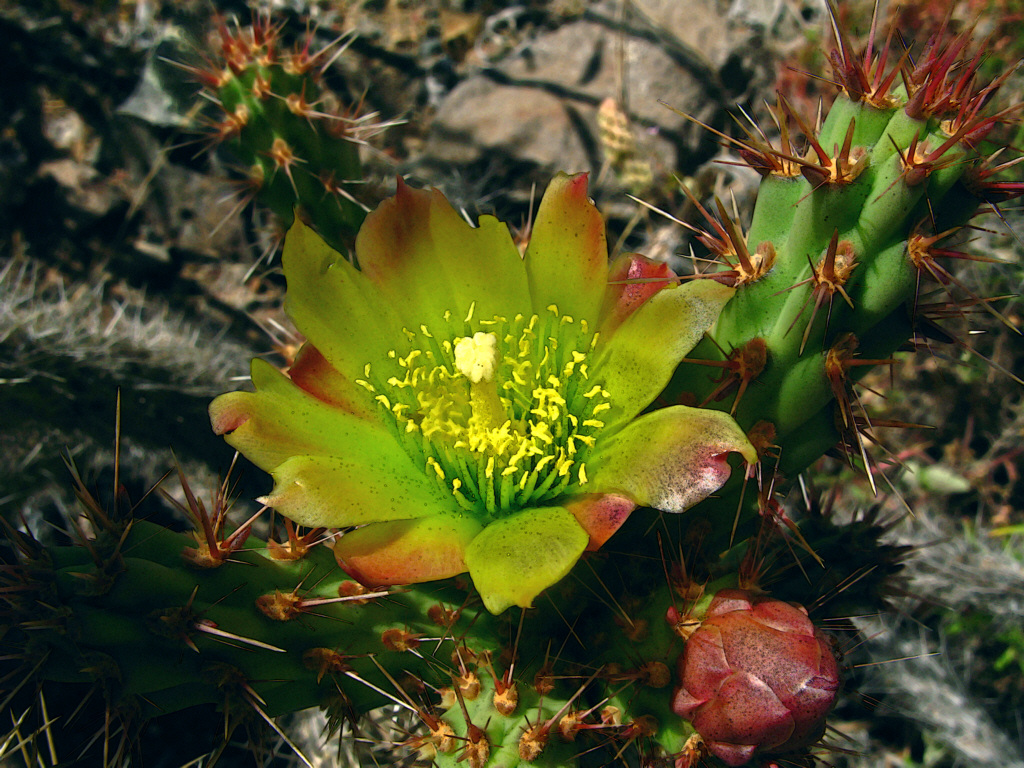
The flower of var. californica in cultivation, at the Regional Parks Botanic Garden in Berkeley, California.

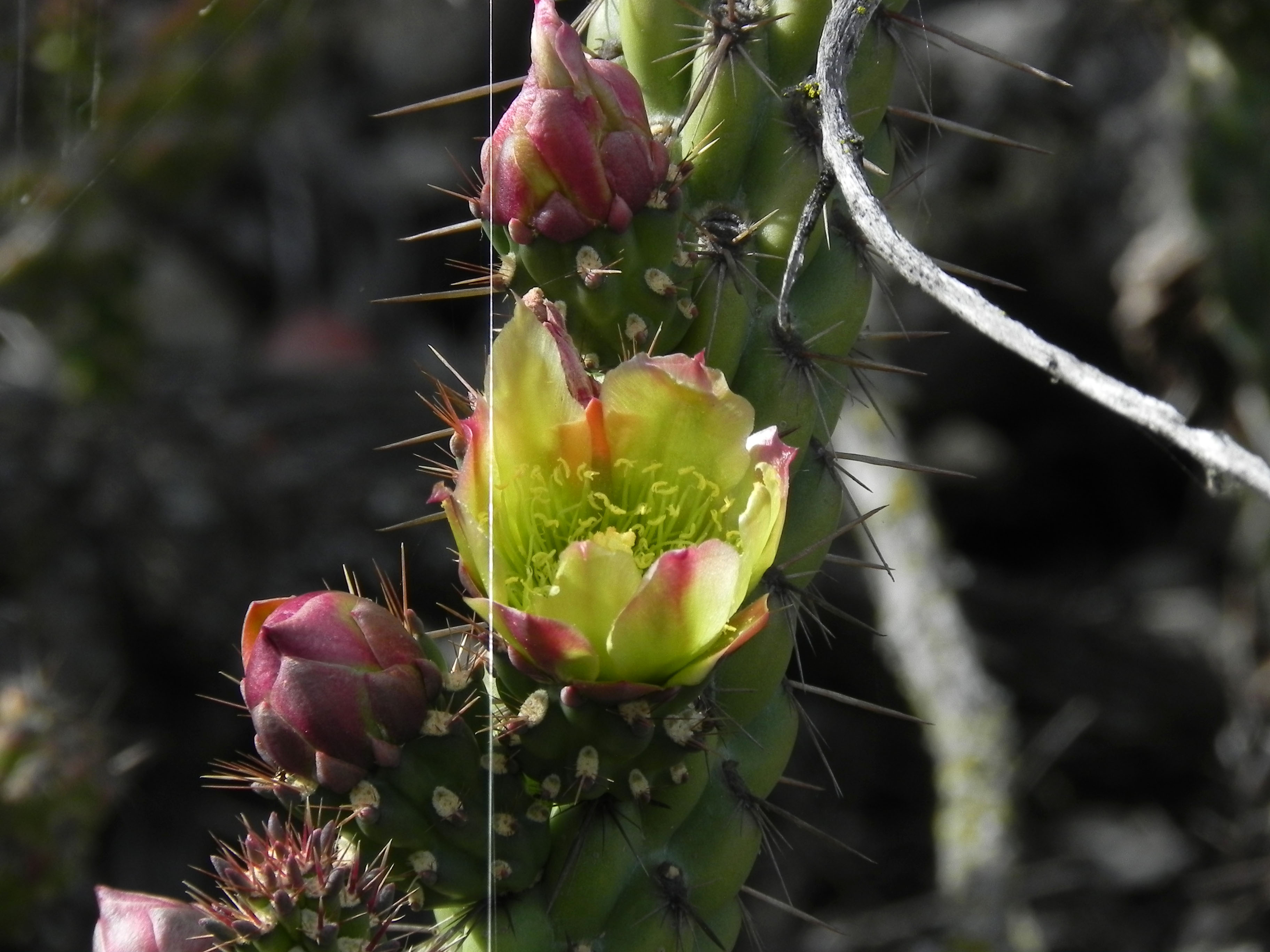
Detail of the flower and some budding flowers on var. californica.

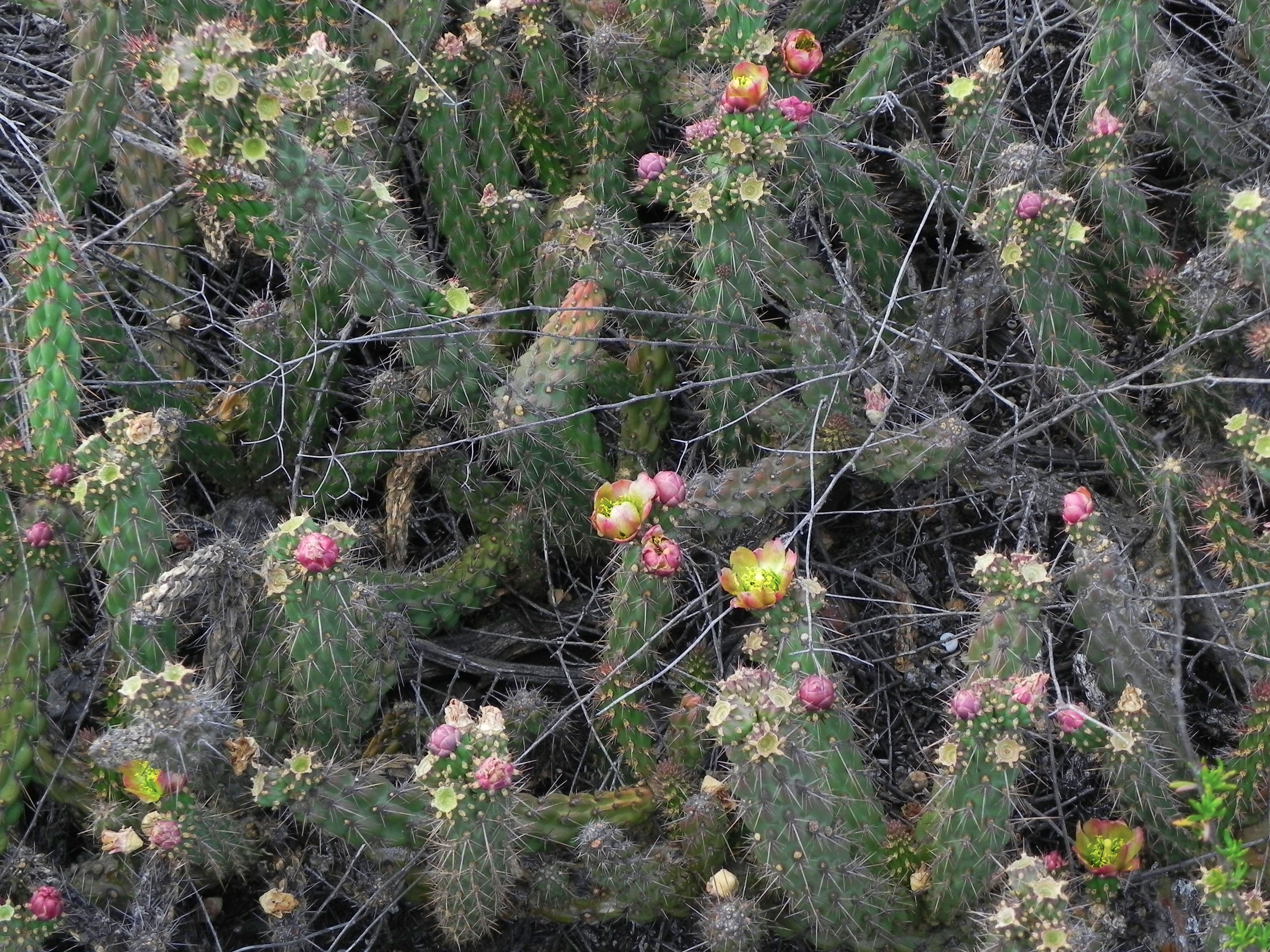
The general decumbent habit of var. californica, in flower.

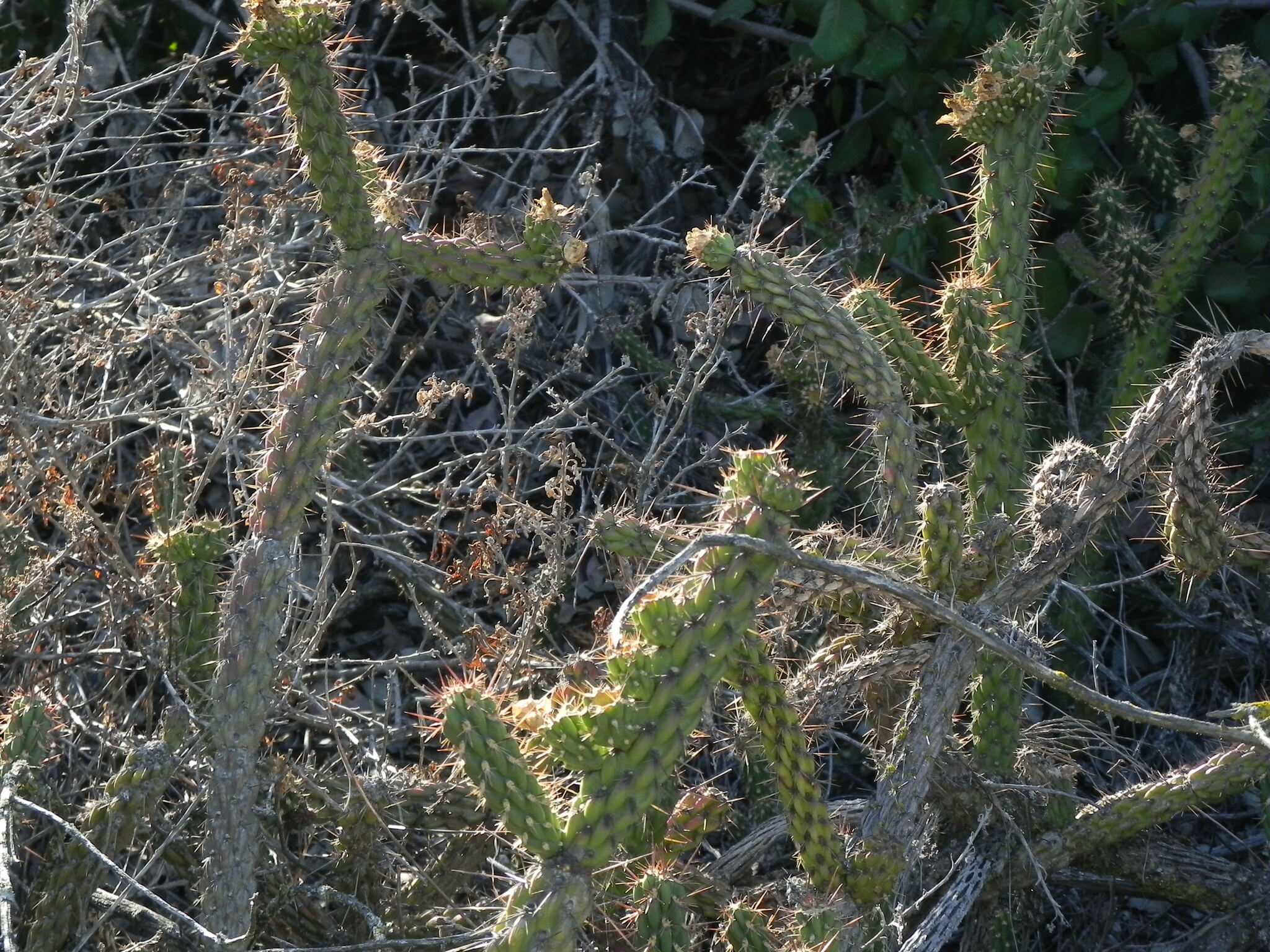
Erect and decumbent stems in var. californica.

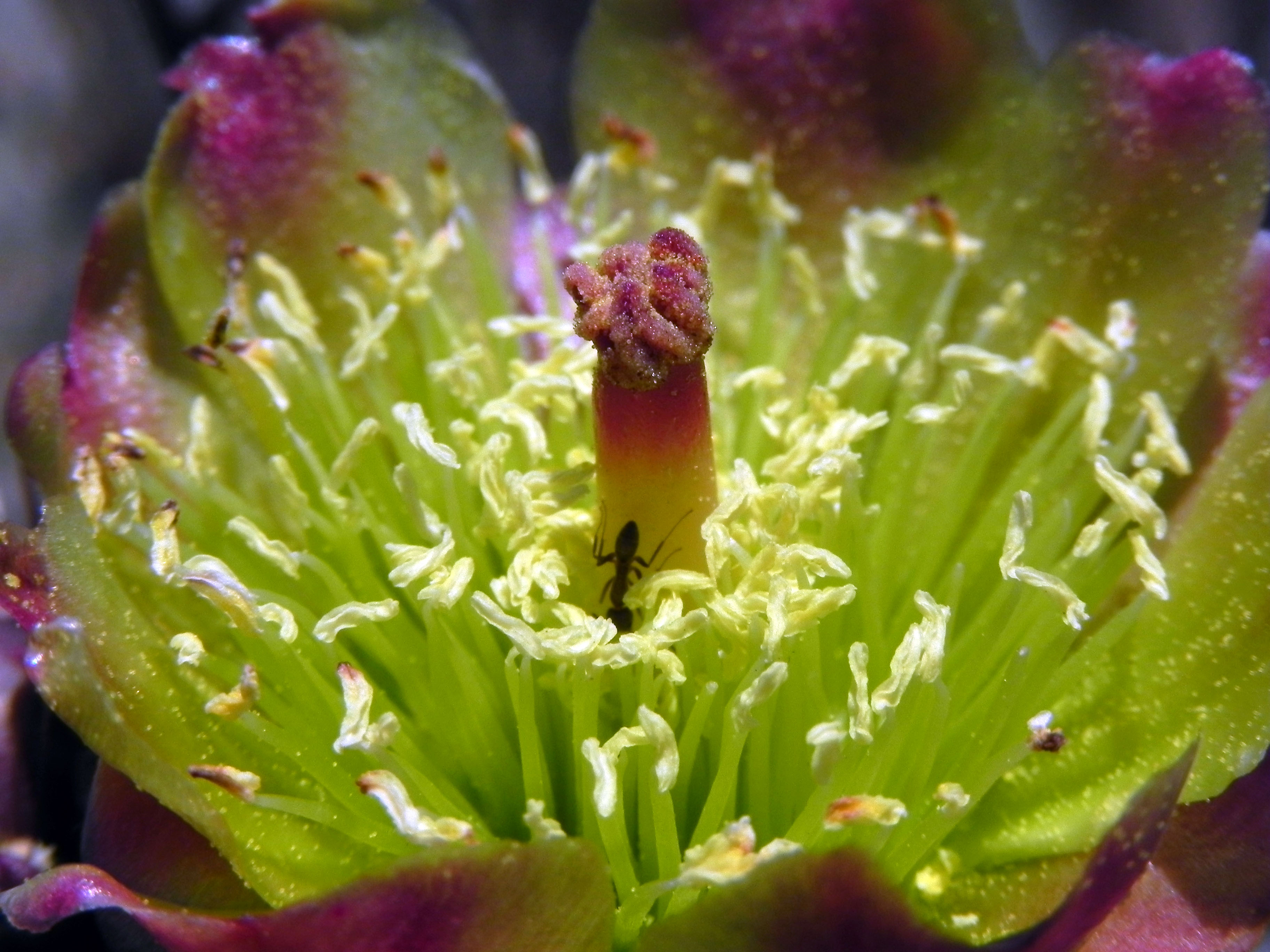
A close-up of the flower of var. californica.
