= Valley Fire (2018) =

2018 wildfire in Southern California

- Part of the 2018 California wildfires
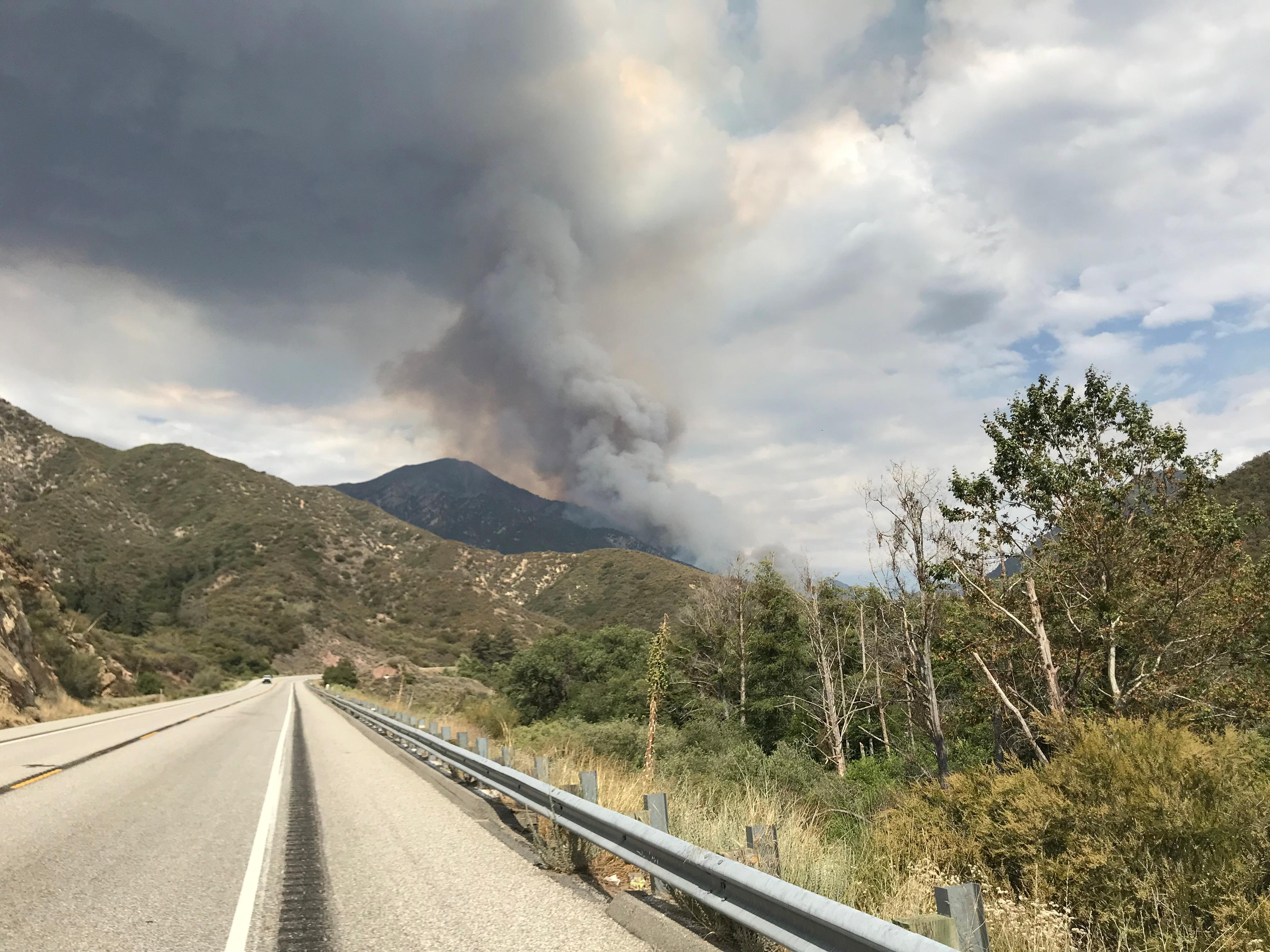
- The Valley Fire on July 6, 2018
- Date: July 6, 2018 –; October 22, 2018
- Location: San Bernardino National Forest, California, United States
- Coordinates: 34.096°N 116.958°W

Statistics
- Burned area: 1,350 acres (5 km^{2})

Impacts
- Deaths: None reported
- Injuries: 5
- Cost: Unknown

Ignition
- Cause: Under investigation

Map
- Location of fire in California.

Location of Valley Fire

The Valley Fire was a wildfire that burned near the community of Forest Falls in San Bernardino National Forest, including the San Gorgonio Wilderness in California, United States. The fire was reported on July 6, 2018, one of a handful of brush fires that started in the area due to high temperatures and dry conditions. The Valley Fire burned 1,350 acres (5 km^{2}) before it was fully contained on October 22. The fire affected traffic on Highway 38 due to road closures and caused evacuations of Forest Falls.

== Progression ==
The Valley Fire was reported on July 6 at 1:42 PM PDT, burning in a steep, inaccessible mountainside near Valley of the Falls Drive and Highway 38 in the San Bernardino National Forest. By the evening, the fire had grown to 1,000 acres (4 km^{2}). Evacuation orders were put in place for the community of Forest Falls and portions of Highway 38 were closed. Fire crews focused on structure protection and security. By the evening of July 7, the fire remained the same acreage and was five percent contained. However, the fire moved north and east into the San Gorgonio Wilderness. Thunderstorms caused debris flows on Highway 38, closing additional portions of the highway.

The fire saw minimal growth on July 8. Rocks and burning material began rolling down hillsides, creating challenges for firefighters, which resulted in low containment. That evening, evacuation orders were lifted. However, additional road closures were put in place along Highway 38 and access to San Gorgonio Wilderness was closed.

On July 15, 5 individuals were reported as being injured in the fire. By July 30, the fire had consumed 1,350 acres (5 km^{2}) and was 30 percent contained. The fire continued to remain active in steep and rugged terrain with helicopters dropping water on the fire and smoke remaining visible in the area. On August 30, the Valley Fire was no longer producing any flames or smoke and remained at 1,350 acres (5.5 km^{2}), while containment had increased to 82%.

On October 22, the Valley Fire was declared to be 100% contained, following significant rainfall from a storm system on October 13.

== Effects ==
The Valley Fire directly impacted the community of Forest Falls and closed the San Gorgonio Wilderness.

=== Evacuations ===
The fire caused the mandatory evacuation of the community of Forest Falls for two days. Inland Leaders Charter School served as the evacuation center.

=== Transportation ===
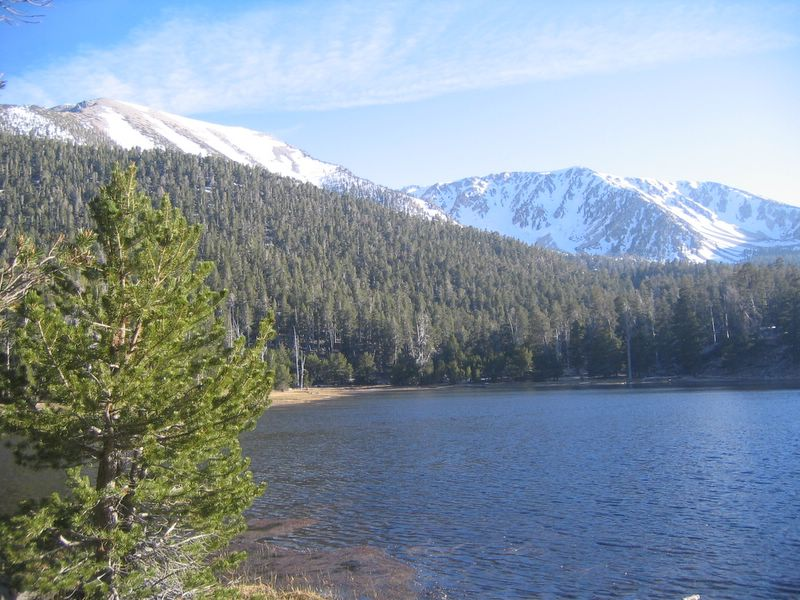
All trails into the San Gorgonio Wilderness were closed due to the Valley Fire.

The fire was initially reported at the intersection of Valley of the Falls Drive and Highway 38. This led to major impacts regarding traffic on the highway, a large portion of which was closed to traffic. On the fire's second day, expanded areas of Highway 38 were closed due to a debris flow caused by a thunderstorm.

=== Recreation ===
Numerous recreation sites were closed in San Bernardino National Forest due to the fire, including picnic areas, and three trails. Additionally, all trails into San Gorgonio Wilderness were closed. Target shooting the national forest was restricted, with only three shooting ranges remaining open due to the restrictions.

== See also ==
- 2018 California wildfires
