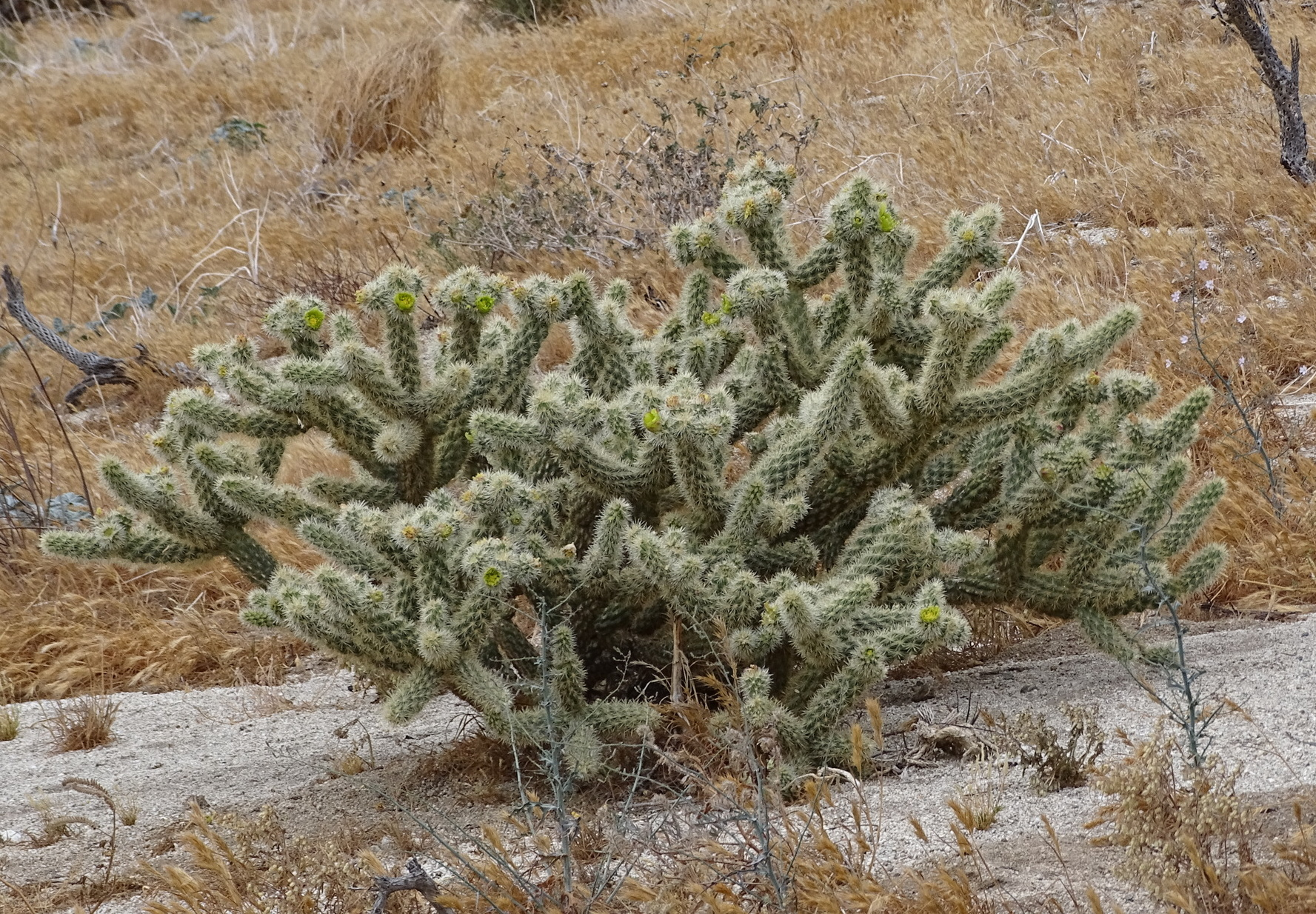

Scientific classification
- Kingdom: Plantae
- Clade: Tracheophytes
- Clade: Angiosperms
- Clade: Eudicots
- Order: Caryophyllales
- Family: Cactaceae
- Genus: Cylindropuntia
- Species: C. ganderi

Binomial name
- Cylindropuntia ganderi (C. B. Wolf) Rebman & Pinkava

Synonyms
- Grusonia ganderi (C.B.Wolf) G.D.Rowley; Opuntia acanthocarpa subsp. ganderi C.B. Wolf; Opuntia ganderi (C.B. Wolf) Rebman & Pinkava

= Cylindropuntia ganderi =

Species of cactus

Cylindropuntia ganderi, also known as Gander cholla and Gander's buckhorn cholla, is a cholla native to the Sonoran Desert of Baja California, Mexico, and the adjacent border area of southern California, US where it intergrades with Cylindropuntia californica.
