= San Bernardino National Forest =

National forest in California, United States

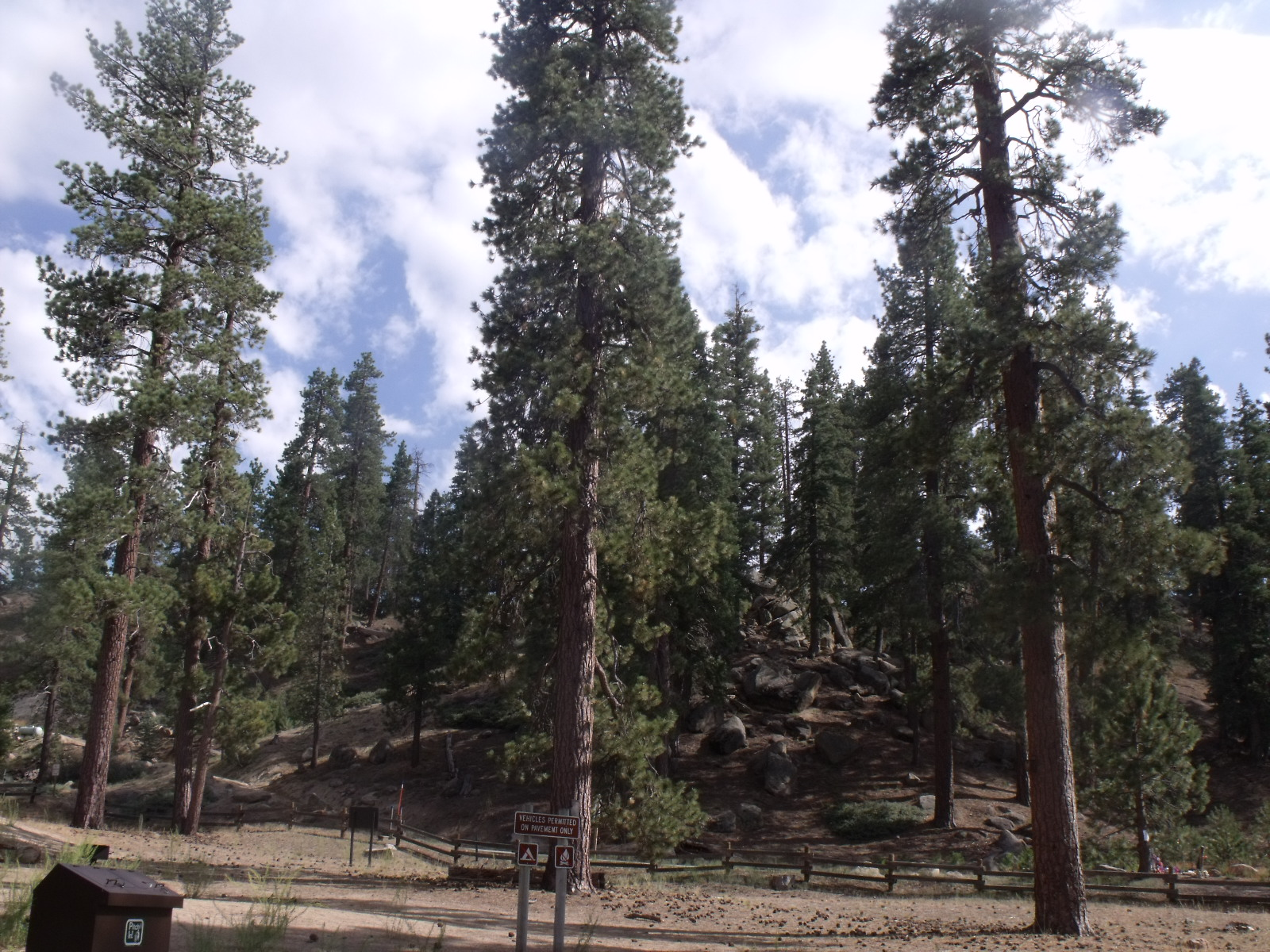
- Forest near Fawnskin
- Interactive map of San Bernardino National Forest
- Location: San Bernardino / Riverside counties, California, United States
- Nearest city: San Bernardino
- Coordinates: 34°08′00″N 117°00′36″W
- Area: 823,816 acres (3,333.87 km^{2})
- Established: 1907
- Governing body: U.S. Forest Service
- Website: San Bernardino National Forest

The San Bernardino National Forest is a United States national forest in Southern California encompassing 823,816 acres (3,333.87 km^{2}) of which 677,982 acres (2,743.70 km^{2}) are federal. The forest is made up of two main divisions, the eastern portion of the San Gabriel Mountains and the San Bernardino Mountains on the easternmost of the Transverse Ranges, and the San Jacinto and Santa Rosa Mountains on the northernmost of the Peninsular Ranges. Elevations range from 2,000 to 11,499 feet (600 to 3505 m). The forest includes seven wilderness areas: San Gorgonio, Cucamonga, San Jacinto, South Fork, Santa Rosa, Cahuilla Mountain and Bighorn Mountain. Forest headquarters are located in the city of San Bernardino. There are district offices in Lytle Creek, Idyllwild, and Fawnskin. The Juan Bautista de Anza National Historic Trail runs through part of the San Bernardino National Forest.

This site was the filming location for Daniel Boone in 1936; part of the 1969 musical film Paint Your Wagon was shot here.

Free camping is available at 47 different 'Yellow Post' campsites located throughout the forest.

== Geography ==
The forest is divided into two large areas or tracts on United States Geological Survey maps, a northern and southern portion.

The west border of the forest adjoins Angeles National Forest and runs north-south about ten miles west of Interstate 15. At its widest parts, the northern portion of the forest runs about 57 miles (90 km) on an east–west dimension. It runs about 24 miles (40 km) on a north–south dimension. This portion of the forest encompasses the San Bernardino Mountains. The area extends west of Mount San Antonio and Wrightwood in San Bernardino County. The eastern portion of the forest extends about ten miles east of Big Bear City and includes the San Gorgonio Wilderness. The southernmost portion is bisected by the Riverside County line and borders the Morongo Indian Reservation north of Cabazon.

At its widest point, the southern portion is about 27 miles (40 km) on a north-south dimension and about 30 miles (50 km) on an east-west dimension. Toro Peak and the Santa Rosa Indian Reservation are near the south extent. At the north is Snow Creek Village and the Morongo Indian Reservation. Mount San Jacinto State Wilderness is carved out of the southern portion. The community of Idyllwild is surrounded by national forest lands.

While most National Forests include lumber resources, these two areas also include:

- Residential communities and resorts
- Indian resources such as historically important caves and pictographs
- The University of California-owned James Reserve research station

The two tallest waterfalls in Southern California, Big Falls and Bonita Falls, are located in the San Bernardino National Forest.

Lost Lake, a sag pond created by tectonic activity associated with the San Andreas Fault as it runs through the Cajon Pass area, is located in the San Bernardino National Forest.

=== Wilderness areas ===
There are seven official wilderness areas lying within San Bernardino National Forest that are part of the National Wilderness Preservation System. One extends into neighboring Angeles National Forest and three into land that is managed by the Bureau of Land Management (as indicated).

- Bighorn Mountain Wilderness (mostly BLM)
- Cahuilla Mountain Wilderness
- Cucamonga Wilderness (partly in Angeles NF)
- San Gorgonio Wilderness (partly BLM)
- San Jacinto Wilderness
- Santa Rosa Wilderness (mostly BLM)
- South Fork San Jacinto Wilderness

== Firefighting ==
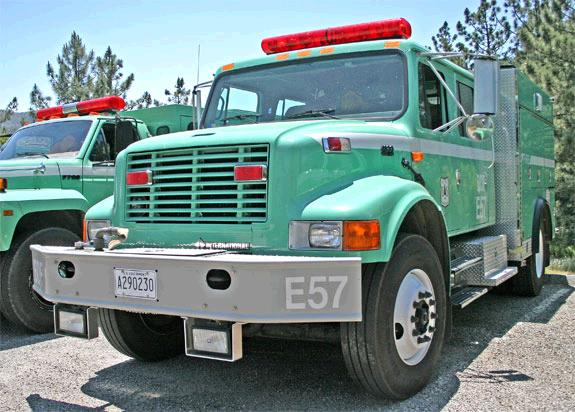
A San Bernardino National Forest fire truck

The San Bernardino National Forest has its own fire stations and engine companies.

=== Aerial operations ===
As of 2001, eight Air Tactical Group Supervisors (ATGSs) work out of the Forest Supervisor's Office in San Bernardino.

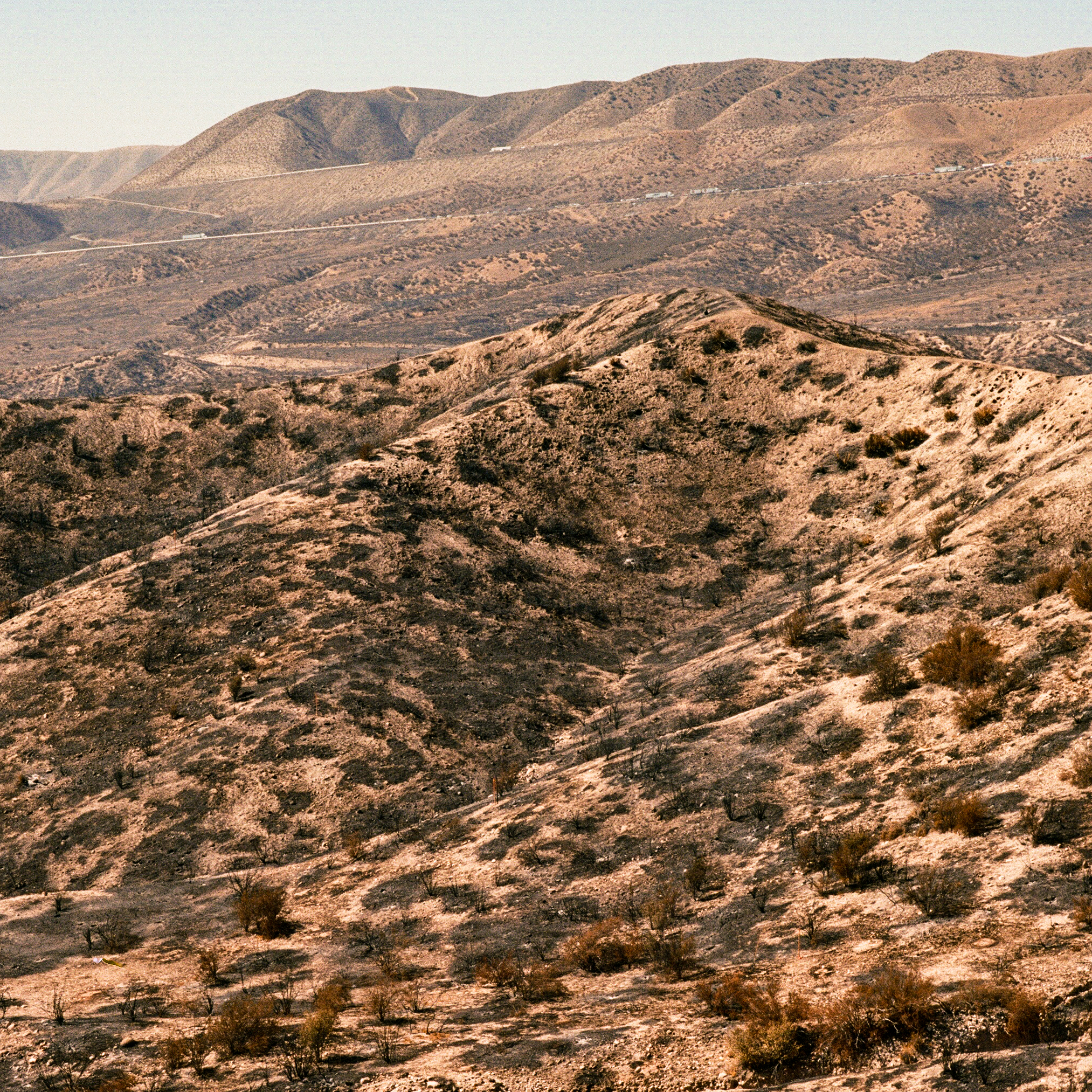
After the Blue Cut Fire in the summer of 2016 along State Route 138.

== Vegetation ==
There are many different species of trees, many coniferous, that grow in the mountains. Pines, such as ponderosa pine, Jeffrey pine, sugar pine, Coulter pine, lodgepole pine, single-leaf pinyon, and knobcone pine all thrive here. Other coniferous trees, such as white fir, bigcone Douglas-fir (Pseudotsuga macrocarpa), incense cedar, and western juniper also thrive here. Canyon live oak, California black oak, and Pacific dogwood are other trees that also grow here. The forest contains an estimated 87,400 acres (354 km^{2}) of old growth. The most common types are Sierra Nevada mixed conifer forests, white fir (Abies concolor) forests, Jeffrey pine (Pinus jeffreyi) forests, and lodgepole pine (Pinus contorta) forests.

== Climbing ==
Rock climbing is popular in some areas of the San Bernardino National Forest, most notably at Tahquitz Rock near Idyllwild.

== In popular culture ==
In the 2013 videogame Grand Theft Auto V, the Paleto Forest is based on the San Bernardino National Forest.

Bald eagle couple Jackie and Shadow, whose nest is live-streamed by Friends of Big Bear Valley, is located in San Bernardino National Forest.

== See also ==
- List of national forests of the United States
- Big Bear Lake
- Deep Creek Hot Springs
- Big Bear Discovery Center
- Fires in San Bernardino National Forest
- Valley Fire
- Cranston Fire
