= Vista Santa Rosa, California =

Vista Santa Rosa
- census-designated place
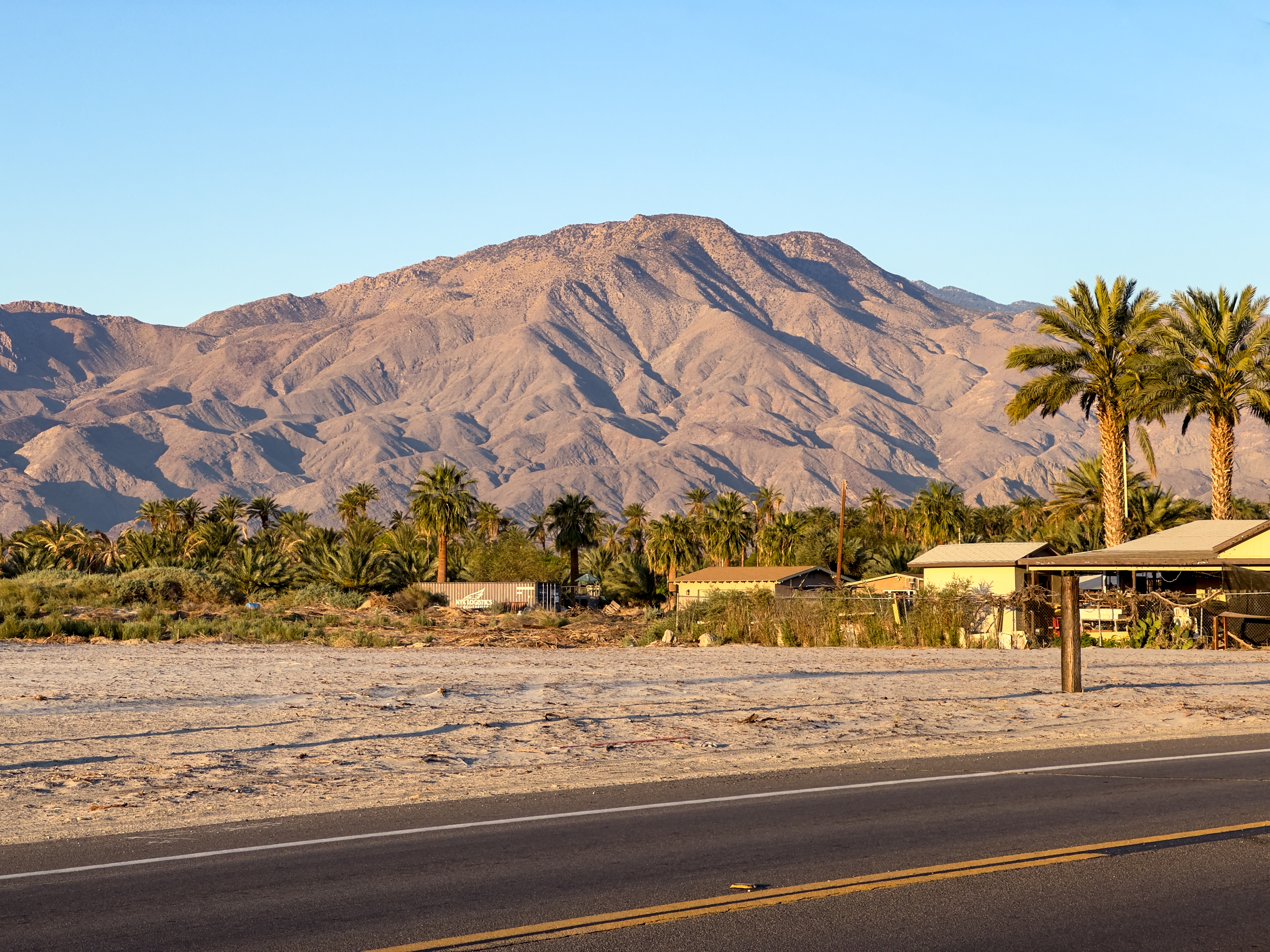
- A view of Martinez Mountain and Toro Peak of the Santa Rosa Mountains and Date palm orchards in Vista Santa Rosa, California

- Location in Riverside County and the state of California

- Location within southern California Location within California Location within the United States
- Coordinates: 33°37′21″N 116°12′45″W
- Named for: Proximity to the Santa Rosa Mountains; Spanish: Vista Santa Rosa ("Santa Rosa [Mountain] View")

Area
  - Total: 16.086 sq mi (41.662 km^{2})
  - Land: 16.073 sq mi (41.630 km^{2})
  - Water: 0.012 sq mi (0.032 km^{2}) 0.08%
- Elevation: −69 ft (−21 m)

Population (2020)
  - Total: 2,607
  - Density: 162.2/sq mi (62.62/km^{2})
- Time zone: UTC-8 (Pacific (PST))
  - Summer (DST): UTC-7 (PDT)
- GNIS feature ID: 2583177

Vista Santa Rosa (Spanish for "Santa Rosa View") is a census-designated place in Riverside County, California. Vista Santa Rosa sits at an elevation of 69 feet (21 m) below sea level. The 2020 United States census reported Vista Santa Rosa's population was 2,607.

The community was named after its location on the eastern foothills of the Santa Rosa Mountains.

== Geography ==
According to the United States Census Bureau, the CDP covers an area of 16.1 square miles (41.7 km^{2}), 99.92% of it land and 0.08% of it water.

== Demographics ==
Historical population
| Census | Pop. | Note | %± |
|---|---|---|---|
| 2010 | 2,926 | | — |
| 2020 | 2,607 | | −10.9% |
U.S. Decennial Census; 1860–1870 1880-1890; 1900 1910 1920; 1930 1940 1950; 1960 1970 1980; 1990 2000 2010

Vista Santa Rosa first appeared as a census designated place in the 2010 U.S. census.

=== Racial and ethnic composition ===
Vista Santa Rosa CDP, California – Racial and ethnic composition Note: the US Census treats Hispanic/Latino as an ethnic category. This table excludes Latinos from the racial categories and assigns them to a separate category. Hispanics/Latinos may be of any race.
| Race / Ethnicity (NH = Non-Hispanic) | Pop 2010 | Pop 2020 | % 2010 | % 2020 |
|---|---|---|---|---|
| White alone (NH) | 312 | 247 | 10.66% | 9.47% |
| Black or African American alone (NH) | 3 | 9 | 0.10% | 0.35% |
| Native American or Alaska Native alone (NH) | 87 | 71 | 2.97% | 2.72% |
| Asian alone (NH) | 5 | 16 | 0.17% | 0.61% |
| Native Hawaiian or Pacific Islander alone (NH) | 0 | 2 | 0.00% | 0.08% |
| Other race alone (NH) | 5 | 15 | 0.17% | 0.58% |
| Mixed race or Multiracial (NH) | 27 | 31 | 0.92% | 1.19% |
| Hispanic or Latino (any race) | 2,487 | 2,216 | 85.00% | 85.00% |
| Total | 2,926 | 2,607 | 100.00% | 100.00% |

=== 2020 census ===
As of the 2020 census, Vista Santa Rosa had a population of 2,607. The population density was 162.2 inhabitants per square mile (62.6/km^{2}). The whole population lived in households.

The median age was 35.3 years. The age distribution was 26.4% under the age of 18, 11.7% aged 18 to 24, 23.0% aged 25 to 44, 26.2% aged 45 to 64, and 12.8% who were 65 years of age or older. For every 100 females there were 109.7 males, and for every 100 females age 18 and over there were 106.0 males age 18 and over.

50.9% of residents lived in urban areas, while 49.1% lived in rural areas.

There were 711 households, out of which 44.6% included children under the age of 18. Of all households, 56.4% were married-couple households, 5.9% were cohabiting couple households, 19.1% had a female householder with no spouse or partner present, and 18.6% had a male householder with no spouse or partner present. About 11.4% of households were one person, and 4.8% had someone living alone who was 65 years of age or older. The average household size was 3.67. There were 596 families (83.8% of all households).

There were 746 housing units at an average density of 46.4 units per square mile (17.9 units/km^{2}), of which 711 (95.3%) were occupied. Of these, 66.4% were owner-occupied, and 33.6% were occupied by renters. Of all housing units, 4.7% were vacant. The homeowner vacancy rate was 0.2% and the rental vacancy rate was 1.6%.

Racial composition as of the 2020 census
| Race | Number | Percent |
|---|---|---|
| White | 607 | 23.3% |
| Black or African American | 15 | 0.6% |
| American Indian and Alaska Native | 125 | 4.8% |
| Asian | 25 | 1.0% |
| Native Hawaiian and Other Pacific Islander | 3 | 0.1% |
| Some other race | 1,263 | 48.4% |
| Two or more races | 569 | 21.8% |
