= Rabbit Peak =

Mountain in California, US

Rabbit Peak, California
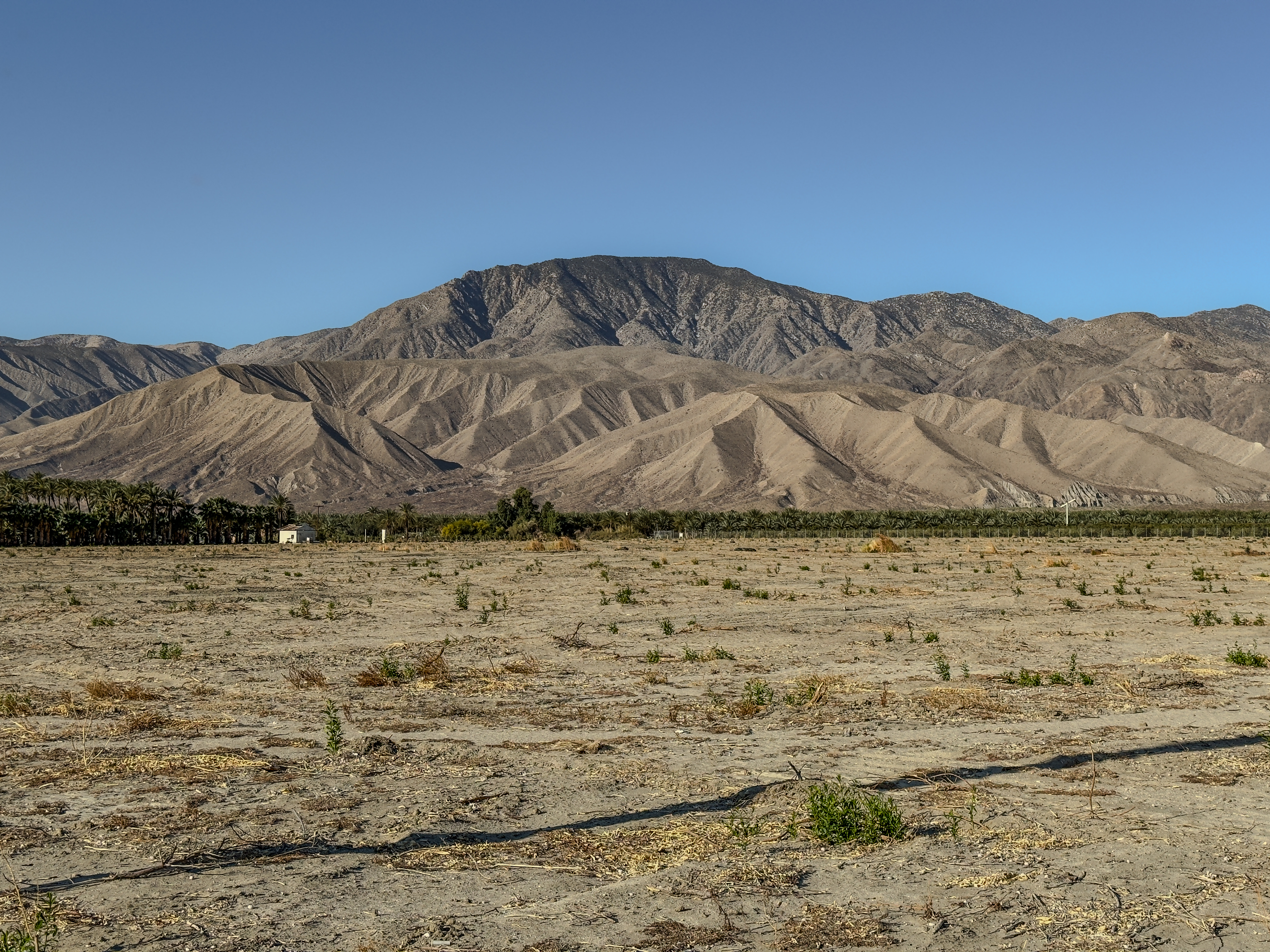
- Rabbit Peak viewed from Oasis, California

Highest point
- Elevation: 6,653 ft (2,028 m) NAVD 88
- Prominence: 1,200 ft (370 m)
- Coordinates: 33°26′01″N 116°14′22″W

Geography
- Location within California
- Location: Riverside County, California, U.S.
- Parent range: Santa Rosa Mountains in the Peninsular Ranges
- Topo map: USGS Rabbit Peak

Rabbit Peak is a mountain in the southern part of the Santa Rosa Mountains in the Peninsular Ranges in California. It is located in Riverside County in the Santa Rosa and San Jacinto Mountains National Monument near the border of San Diego County and Anza-Borrego Desert State Park. It has an elevation of 6,653 feet (2,028 meters). It is located 14 miles northeast of Borrego Springs and 20 miles south of Indio.

The peak has been described as the hardest mountain to climb in Southern California. The easiest route to the summit gains over 6,000 feet of elevation over rugged, trailless, waterless terrain.
