= Hot Springs Mountain =

Mountain in San Diego County, California, U.S.

- Location within California Location within San Diego County, California

Highest point
- Elevation: 6,533 ft (1,991 m) NAVD 88
- Prominence: 2,613 ft (796 m)
- Listing: California county high points 34th
- Coordinates: 33°18′55″N 116°34′47″W

Geography
- Location: San Diego County, California, U.S.
- Parent range: Peninsular Ranges
- Topo map: USGS Hot Springs Mountain

Hot Springs Mountain is a peak in the Peninsular Ranges in San Diego County, California. The mountain rises to an elevation of 6,533 feet (1,991 m) and is the highest point in the county. Some snow falls on the mountain peak during winter. It is located in a remote region of the county, four miles from the community of Warner Springs, 12 miles from Borrego Springs, and 50 miles from San Diego. The mountain and its immediate surroundings belong to the Los Coyotes Band of Cahuilla and Cupeno Indians. The summit and fire tower can be hiked via the Sukat Road route from the campground. Hikers and campers must pay an entry fee to access the area.

The peak offers views of San Diego, Riverside, San Bernardino, and Imperial counties on a clear day. To the north, Mount San Jacinto and Mount San Gorgonio can be seen, and on a very clear day, Mount Baldy (Mount San Antonio) can be seen too. Toro Peak and San Rosa Mountain are visible due northeast. Looking east, Anza-Borrego Desert State Park is visible, along with the Salton Sea. Visible to the south is Cuyamaca Peak, the second highest point in San Diego County. On a very clear day, urban San Diego can be seen across the mountains. Finally, to the west, the extreme vastness of the Pacific Ocean is visible, even Catalina Island. The furthest point visible is the Topatopa Mountains of Ventura County over 150 miles away. Palomar Mountain is also a point of interest. Tree species found on the mountain peak include Jeffrey pine, ponderosa pine, white fir, incense cedar, and sugar pine.

From 2010 through 2012, the mountain and the surrounding land were leased by the tribe to a military training business, Eagle Rock Training Center. The business was evicted in early 2012 at the conclusion of an acrimonious court dispute.
