= Oasis, Riverside County, California =

Oasis
- census-designated place
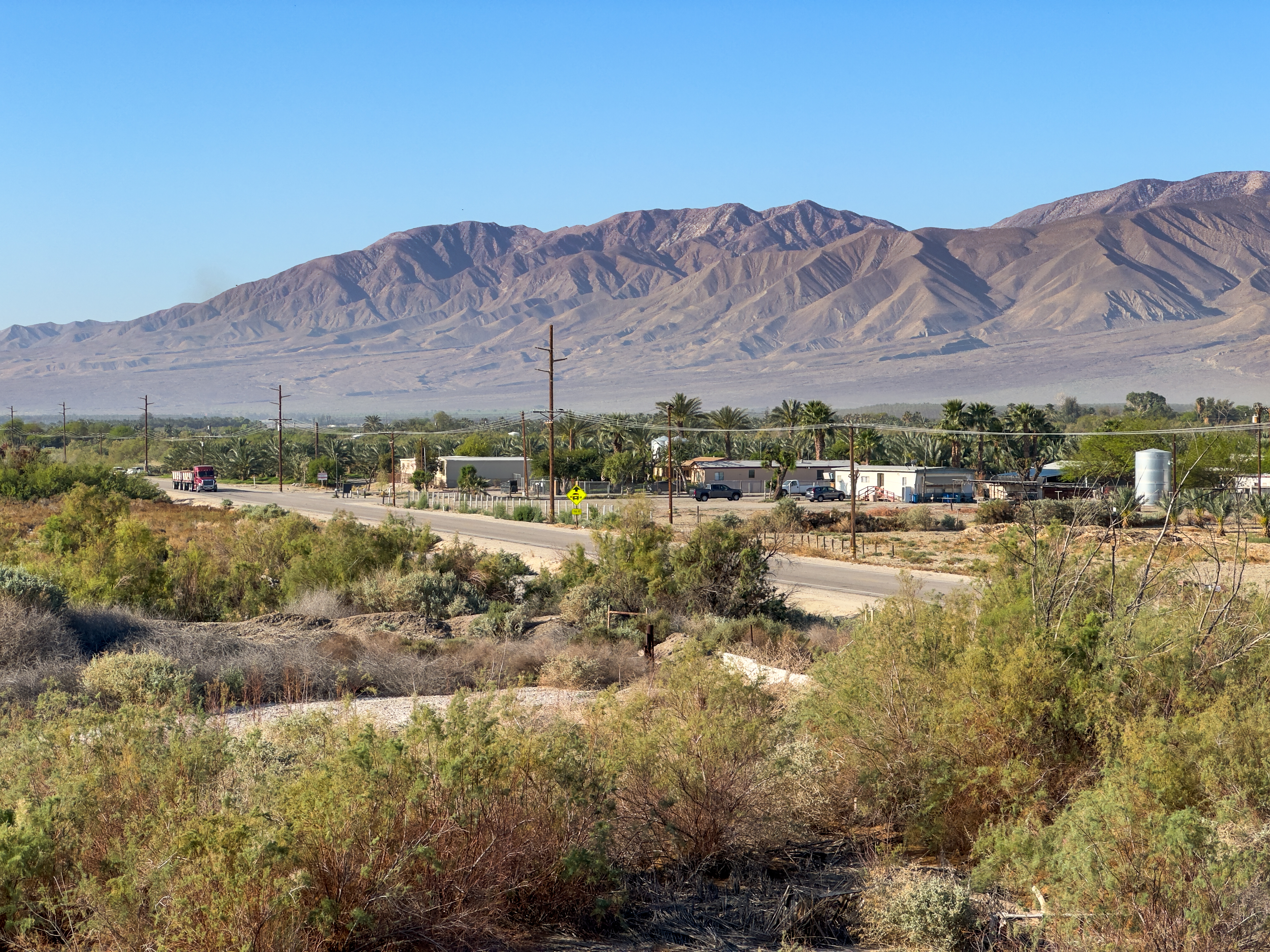
- Oasis, California and Santa Rosa Mountains

- Location in Riverside County, California

- Position in California.
- Coordinates: 33°31′39″N 116°07′34″W
- Country: United States
- State: California
- County: Riverside

Area
  - Total: 19.626 sq mi (50.832 km^{2})
  - Land: 19.626 sq mi (50.832 km^{2})
  - Water: 0 sq mi (0 km^{2}) 0%
- Elevation: −141 ft (−43 m)

Population (2020)
  - Total: 4,468
  - Density: 227.7/sq mi (87.90/km^{2})
- Time zone: UTC-8 (Pacific (PST))
  - Summer (DST): UTC-7 (PDT)
- GNIS feature ID: 2630708

Oasis is a census-designated place in the California county of Riverside. Oasis sits at an elevation of 141 feet (43 m) below sea level. The 2020 United States census reported Oasis's population was 4,468, down from 6,890 in 2010.

== Geography ==
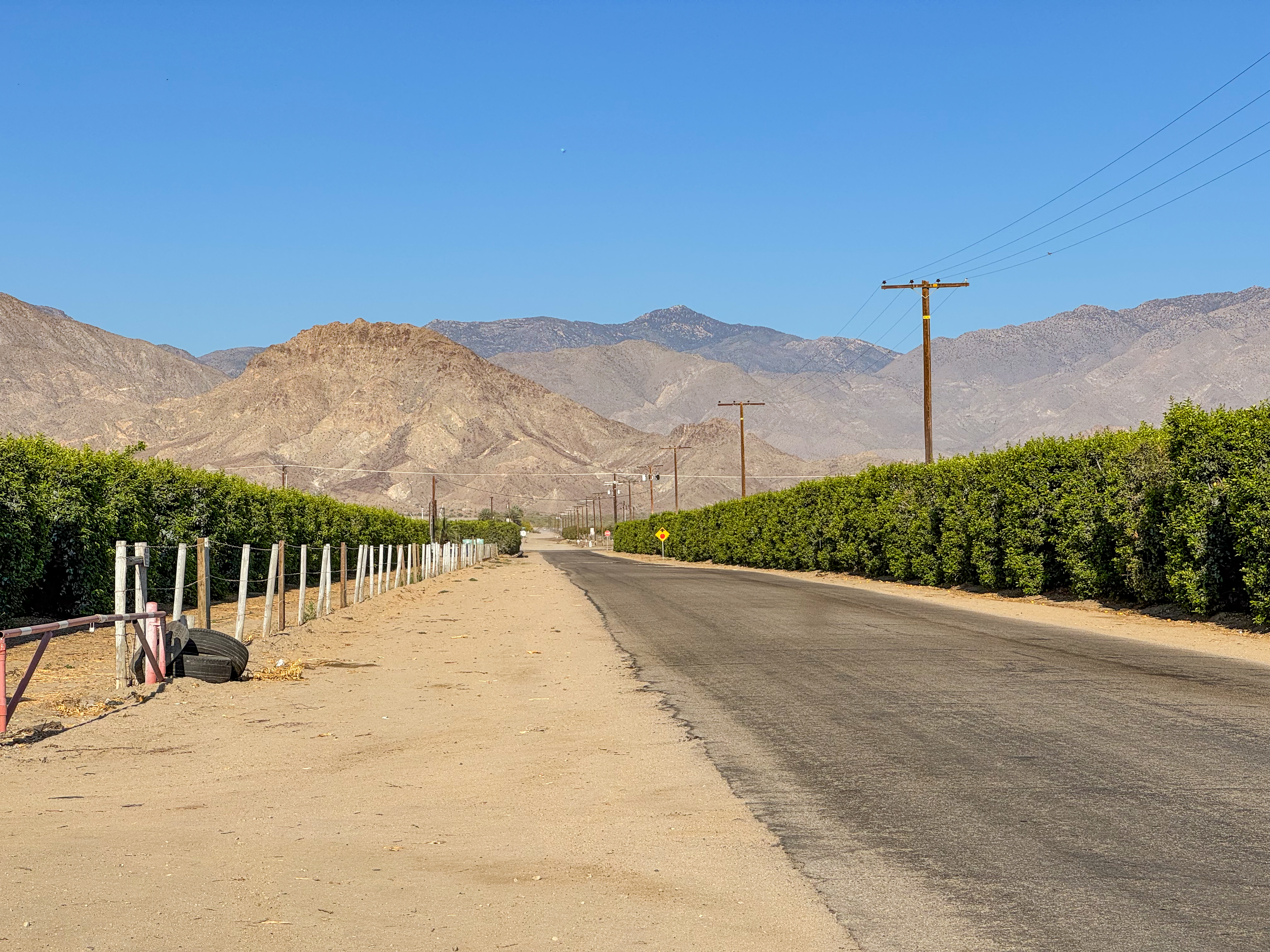
Orange Groves in Oasis, California and Toro Peak

One of several communities in the Coachella Valley, Oasis lies along the eastern foothills of the Santa Rosa Mountains. It also extends towards the south along the northwestern shores of the Salton Sea. According to the United States Census Bureau, the CDP covers an area of 19.6 square miles (50.8 km^{2}), all of it land.

California State Route 86 passes through Oasis.

== Demographics ==
Historical population
Census	Pop.	Note	%±
2010	6,890		—
2020	4,468		−35.2%
U.S. Decennial Census; 1860–1870 1880-1890; 1900 1910 1920; 1930 1940 1950; 1960 1970 1980; 1990 2000 2010

Oasis first appeared as a census designated place in the 2010 U.S. census.

=== Racial and ethnic composition ===
Oasis CDP, California – Racial and ethnic composition Note: the US Census treats Hispanic/Latino as an ethnic category. This table excludes Latinos from the racial categories and assigns them to a separate category. Hispanics/Latinos may be of any race.
Race / Ethnicity (NH = Non-Hispanic)	Pop 2010	Pop 2020	% 2010	% 2020
White alone (NH)	68	30	0.99%	0.67%
Black or African American alone (NH)	1	6	0.01%	0.13%
Native American or Alaska Native alone (NH)	36	71	0.52%	1.59%
Asian alone (NH)	39	30	0.57%	0.67%
Native Hawaiian or Pacific Islander alone (NH)	0	0	0.00%	0.00%
Other race alone (NH)	0	34	0.00%	0.76%
Mixed race or Multiracial (NH)	15	17	0.22%	0.38%
Hispanic or Latino (any race)	6,731	4,280	97.69%	95.79%
Total	6,890	4,468	100.00%	100.00%

=== 2020 census ===
The 2020 United States census reported that Oasis had a population of 4,468. The population density was 227.7 inhabitants per square mile (87.9/km^{2}). The racial makeup of Oasis was 12.6% White, 0.2% African American, 7.3% Native American, 0.7% Asian, 0.0% Pacific Islander, 59.4% from other races, and 19.7% from two or more races. Hispanic or Latino of any race were 95.8% of the population.

The census reported that 99.7% of the population lived in households, 0.3% lived in non-institutionalized group quarters, and no one was institutionalized.

There were 1,036 households, out of which 65.6% included children under the age of 18, 57.0% were married-couple households, 7.9% were cohabiting couple households, 20.0% had a female householder with no partner present, and 15.1% had a male householder with no partner present. 10.2% of households were one person, and 3.2% were one person aged 65 or older. The average household size was 4.3. There were 891 families (86.0% of all households).

The age distribution was 36.9% under the age of 18, 12.1% aged 18 to 24, 25.8% aged 25 to 44, 19.5% aged 45 to 64, and 5.7% who were 65 years of age or older. The median age was 26.0 years. For every 100 females, there were 102.6 males.

There were 1,077 housing units at an average density of 54.9 units per square mile (21.2 units/km^{2}), of which 1,036 (96.2%) were occupied. Of these, 45.3% were owner-occupied, and 54.7% were occupied by renters.
