= Santa Rosa Mountain (Riverside County) =

Mountain summit in Riverside County, California

- A view of Santa Rosa Mountain from Pines to Palms Trail

Highest point
- Elevation: 8,052 ft (2,454 m)

Geography
- Location within California
- Country: United States
- State: California
- County: Riverside County
- Range coordinates: 33°32′17.50″N 116°27′40.93″W
- Parent range: Santa Rosa Mountains

Santa Rosa Mountain is a mountain summit of the Santa Rosa Mountains, in Riverside County, California.

== Geography ==
Santa Rosa Mountain is the northernmost summit of the Santa Rosa Mountains. It is located within the Santa Rosa and San Jacinto Mountains National Monument. Palm Canyon lies at the northwestern base of Santa Rosa Mountain. Palm Canyon is the landform that separates the San Jacinto Mountains from the Santa Rosa Mountains.

== See also ==
- Mountains of Riverside County, California
