= Coyote Mountain (California) =

Mountain in San Diego County, California, US

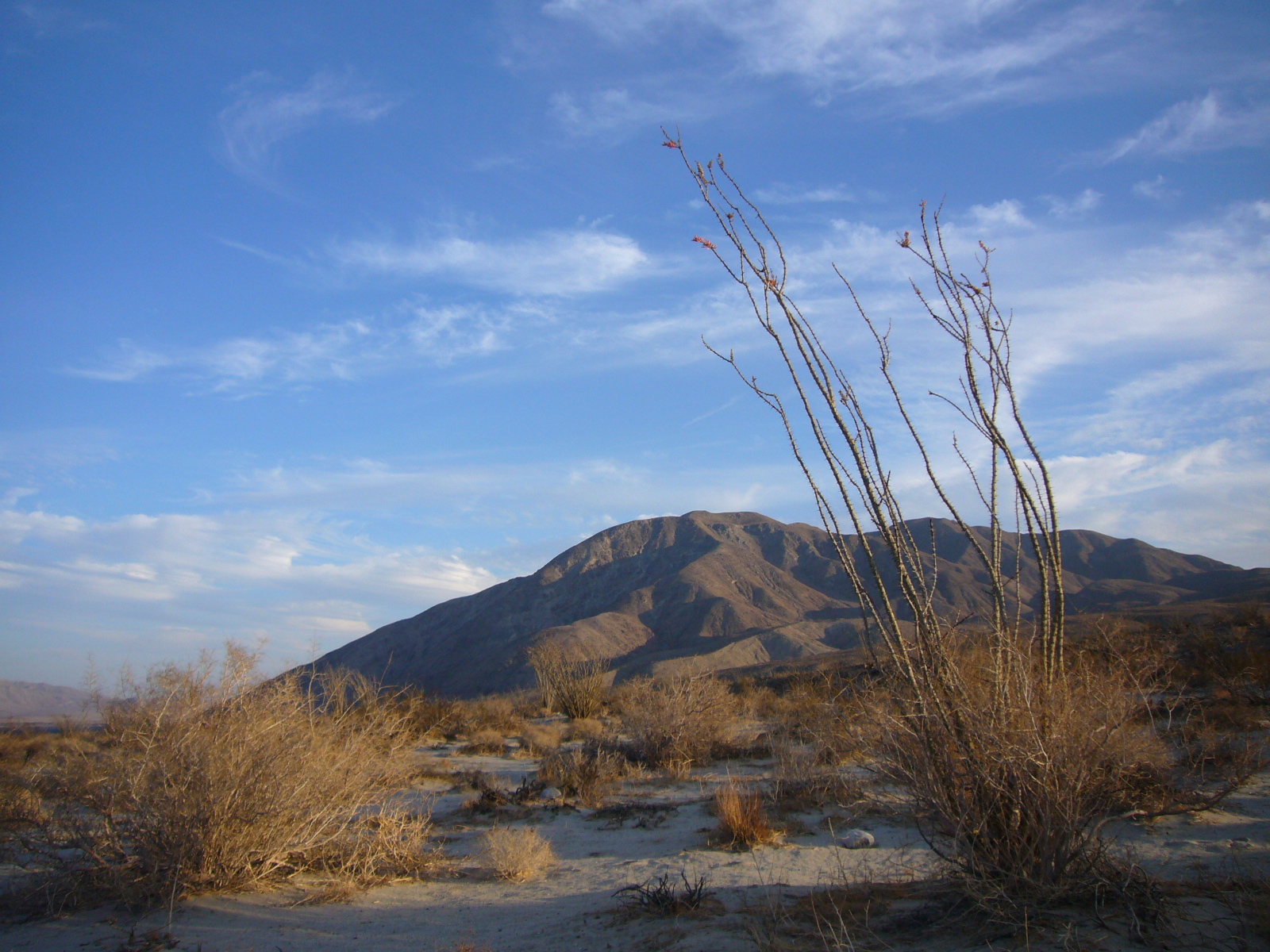
- Coyote Mountain with an Ocotillo in the foreground.

Highest point
- Elevation: 3,194 ft (974 m) NAVD 88
- Prominence: 1,592 ft (485 m)
- Listing: San Diego peak list
- Coordinates: 33°20′36″N 116°19′44″W

Geography
- Location: San Diego County, California, U.S.
- Parent range: Santa Rosa Mountains
- Topo map: USGS Clark Lake

Climbing
- Easiest route: Hike, class 1

Coyote Mountain is a mountain in the Santa Rosa Mountains range, in eastern San Diego County, California.

It is located in the eastern Colorado Desert, within Anza-Borrego Desert State Park.

There are campgrounds for vacationers, as well as a local campground for local school children.
