= Mojave and Colorado Deserts Biosphere Reserve =

Coordinates: 33°35′N 116°20′W

The Mojave and Colorado Deserts Biosphere Reserve is a biosphere reserve designated by UNESCO in 1984 to promote the ecological conservation of a cluster of areas in the Mojave and Colorado deserts of California. A principal feature is Death Valley. The four management units encompassed by the reserve upon its creation were:

- Death Valley National Park (in the Mojave Desert)
- Joshua Tree National Park (in the Mojave/Colorado transition zone)
- Santa Rosa Mountains Wildlife Management Area (in the Colorado Desert)
- Anza-Borrego Desert State Park (in the Colorado Desert)

The current boundaries of the Reserve are unclear, because Death Valley National Monument was subsequently expanded and reorganized into Death Valley National Park, and the Santa Rosa Mountains Wildlife Management Area into the Santa Rosa and San Jacinto Mountains National Monument. There has been little published about the Reserve since its creation, and it appears to have been essentially overlooked. However interest in this Reserve seems to be increasing in 2008 with the increase in proposals for human use activity within Anza-Borrego Desert State Park (see SDG&E Sunrise Powerlink proposal).
