= Toro Peak =

Mountain in California, United States

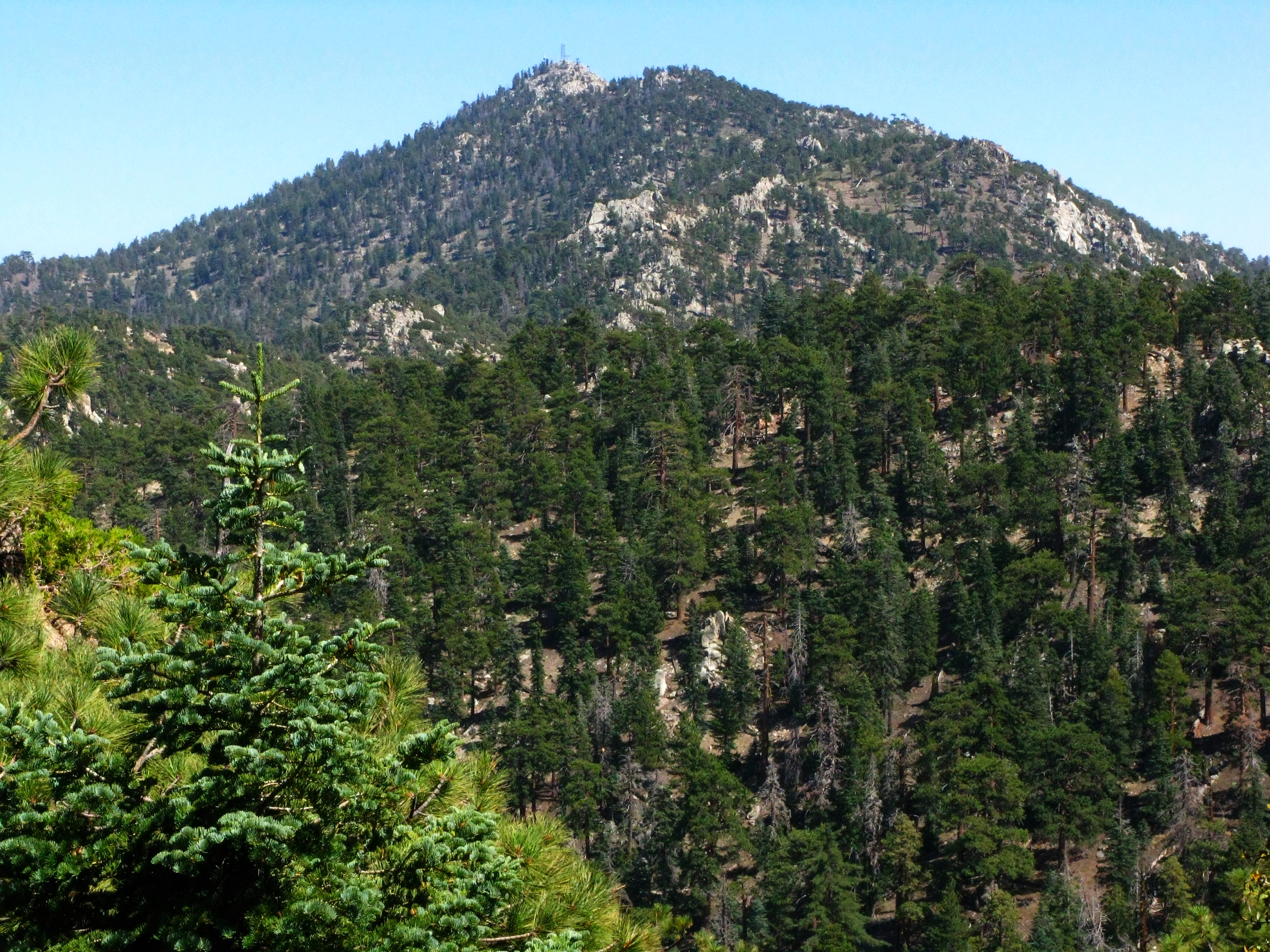
- Toro Peak

Highest point
- Elevation: 8,717 ft (2,657 m) NAVD 88
- Prominence: 3,996 ft (1,218 m)
- Coordinates: 33°31′24″N 116°25′32″W

Geography
- Location: Riverside County, California, U.S.
- Parent range: Santa Rosa Mountains
- Topo map: USGS Toro Peak

Toro Peak, in Southern California, is the highest mountain in the Santa Rosa Mountain Range. It is located 15 miles (24 km) south of Palm Springs, 12 miles (19 km) west of the Salton Sea, and 31 miles (50 km) east of Temecula, in the County of Riverside, California.

Part of the mountain is under the jurisdiction of the San Bernardino National Forest. Another portion, including the 8,717 ft summit and the United States Geological Survey marker on the summit (registered in 1939), is gated and controlled by the Santa Rosa Indian Reservation. A third portion of the mountain is administered by the Santa Rosa and San Jacinto Mountains National Monument.

== Location ==
The mountain is accessible from California State Route 74 (also known as the Pines to Palms Highway) via a dirt road approximately 5 miles east of Route 74's junction with Route 371.

The dirt road begins at an elevation of 4,700 feet and heads towards the summit for approximately 13 miles. A 4x4 or off-road vehicle is recommended because the road is steep and rocky. It comes to a locked gate around 8,200 ft and from there it is a 500-foot hike to the summit up a rough maintenance road that passes the former MCI (now owned by Verizon Communications) primary power generator that provides electricity to the summit.

== Top of the peak ==
From Toro Peak's summit one can see the Santa Rosa Mountain Range to Palm Springs, and neighboring mountains such as San Jacinto Peak, Mount San Gorgonio, Palomar Mountain, and Hot Springs Mountain. To the east/southeast, the Salton Sea and Imperial Valley are visible. From the peak in good weather Charleston Peak in Nevada is also visible.

== Vegetation ==
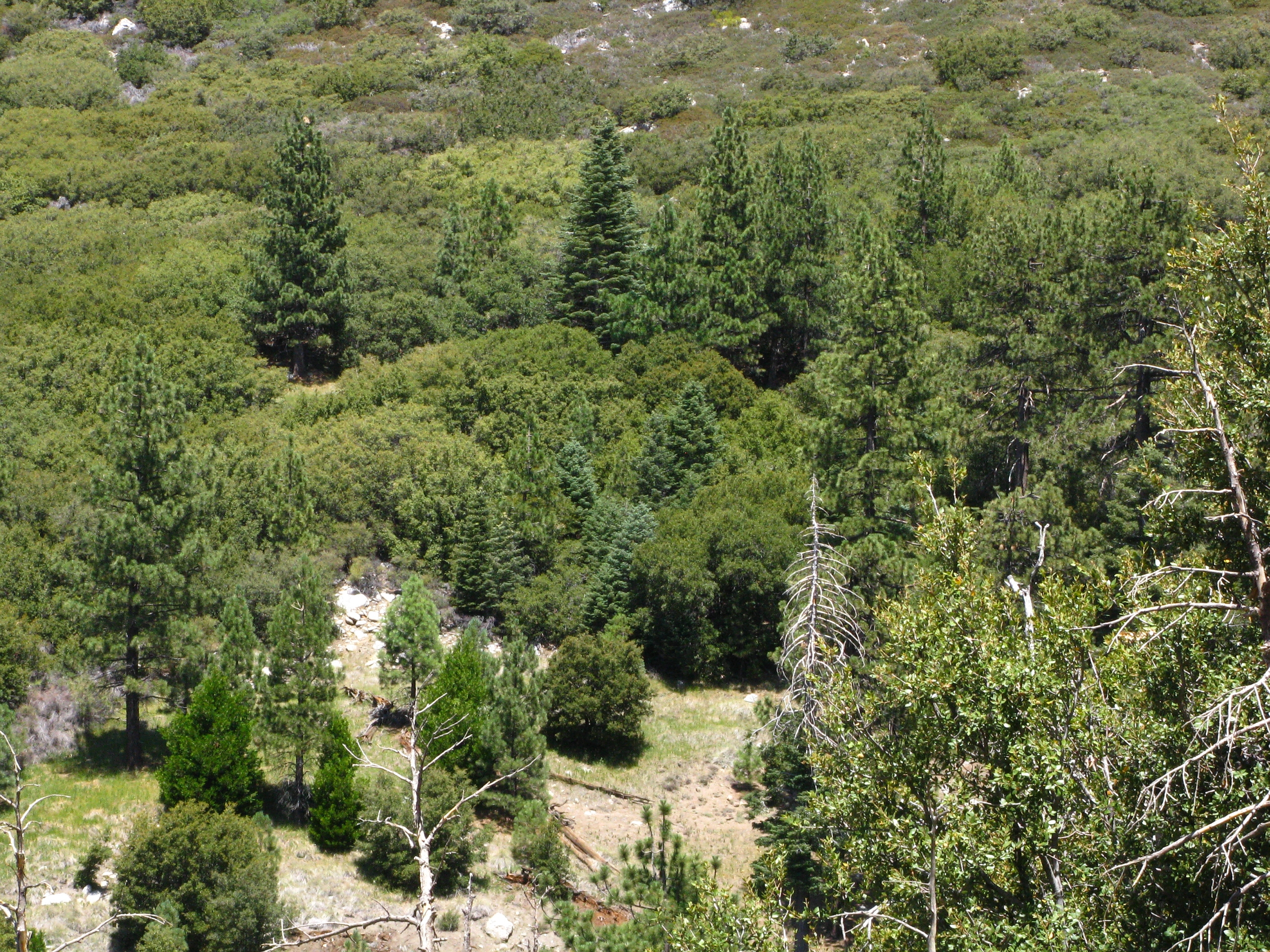
Mixed Conifers, White Firs, Incense Cedars and Jeffrey Pines

Toro Peak and the Santa Rosa Mountains come under the category of sky island mountains. Vegetation on the mountain is a mixed variety of trees: Incense Cedar, White Fir, Jeffrey Pine, Ponderosa Pine, Sugar Pine and on the highest slopes Limber Pine, which is an ice age remnant species. Typical of mountains closest to the Pacific in California, these trees ignore the elevation separations of vegetation (known as life zones) that are found on many other mountains. For example, in the adjacent picture, trees such as White Fir and Incense Cedar, are seen growing on the lowest extent of the mountain beside dryer, weather-tolerant trees such as Jeffrey Pine and Ponderosa Pine.

== Climate ==
In winter, the weather on Toro Peak and the Santa Rosa Mountains can be difficult. Snow falls on the mountain more than a few times during the winter and accounts for most of the annual precipitation, with a second percentage coming from monsoonal thunderstorms during the summer. Nighttime and daytime seasonal lows in the winter and seasonal summer highs are taken from the Long Valley Ranger Station on neighboring Mount San Jacinto.

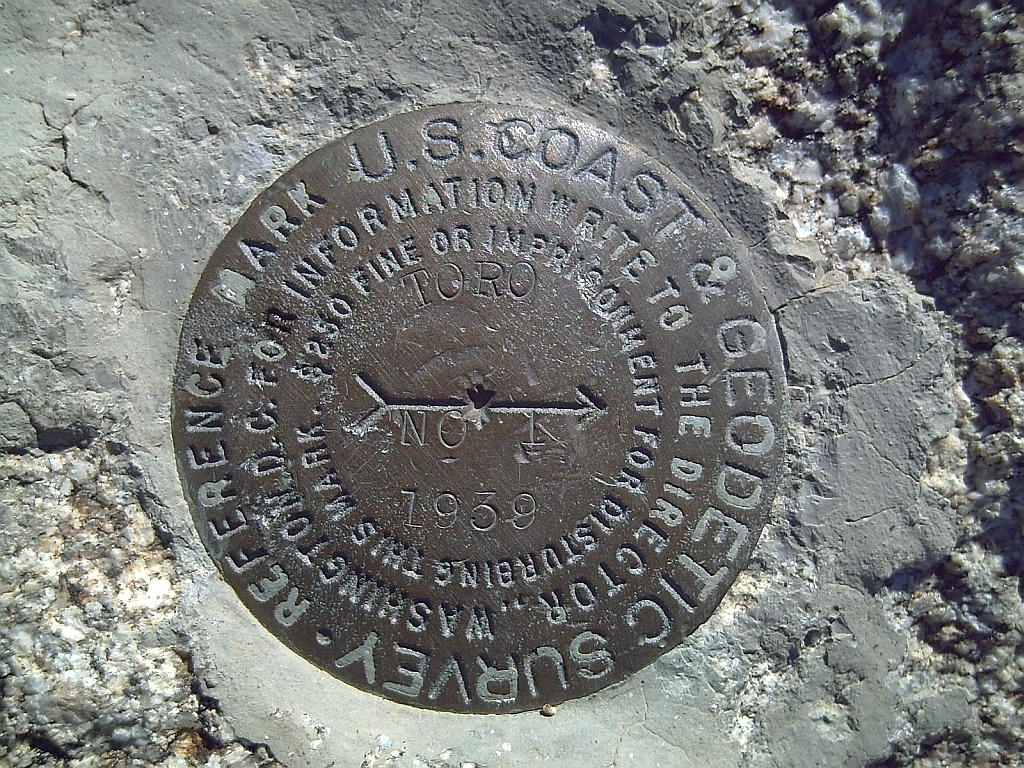
Toro Peak 1939 Geological Survey Marker

This mountain is one of the many scattered sky islands in the southwest. Toro Peak's high elevation helps clear the smog emitted from Los Angeles and the Inland Empire. There is limited human activity beyond a few remote campsites on various parts of the mountain. The peak has a warm-summer Mediterranean climate (Csb).

Climate data for Toro Peak 1981-2010 (33.523 -116.426)
Month	Jan	Feb	Mar	Apr	May	Jun	Jul	Aug	Sep	Oct	Nov	Dec	Year
Mean daily maximum °C (°F)	8.4 (47.1)	8.6 (47.5)	10.1 (50.2)	14.1 (57.4)	18.6 (65.5)	23.7 (74.7)	25.7 (78.3)	25.4 (77.7)	22.5 (72.5)	17.1 (62.8)	11.9 (53.4)	8.1 (46.6)	16.2 (61.1)
Daily mean °C (°F)	3.4 (38.1)	3.3 (37.9)	4.4 (39.9)	7.6 (45.7)	11.7 (53.1)	16.6 (61.9)	19.4 (66.9)	19.1 (66.4)	16.3 (61.3)	11.0 (51.8)	6.7 (44.1)	3.0 (37.4)	10.2 (50.4)
Mean daily minimum °C (°F)	−1.6 (29.1)	−2.1 (28.2)	−1.3 (29.7)	1.1 (34.0)	4.9 (40.8)	9.5 (49.1)	13.0 (55.4)	12.8 (55.0)	10.0 (50.0)	4.9 (40.8)	1.4 (34.5)	−2.1 (28.2)	4.2 (39.6)
Average precipitation mm (inches)	120 (4.7)	102 (4.0)	60 (2.4)	20 (0.8)	11 (0.4)	1 (0.0)	26 (1.0)	37 (1.5)	19 (0.7)	19 (0.7)	41 (1.6)	103 (4.1)	559 (21.9)
Source: http://www.climatewna.com/

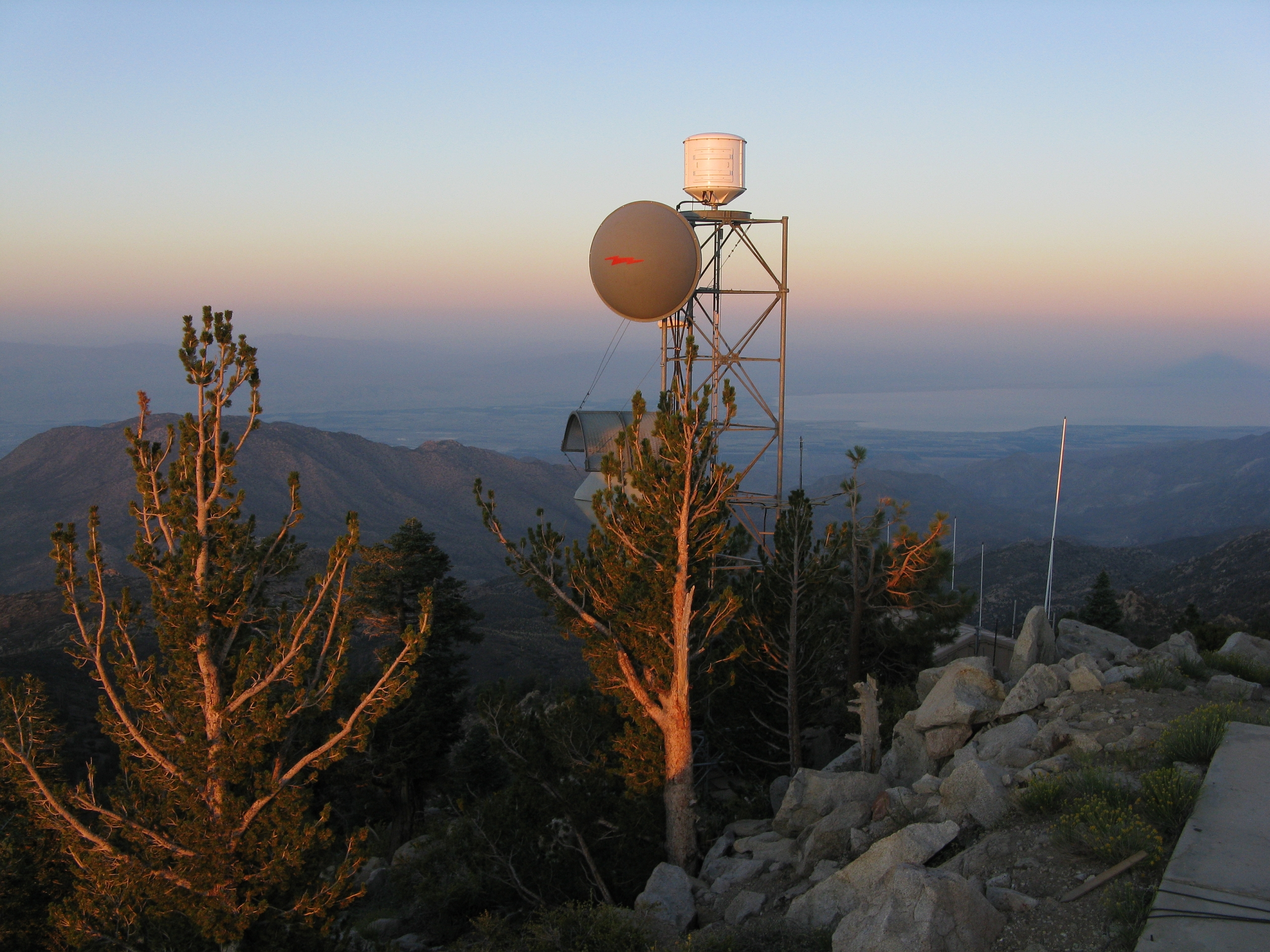

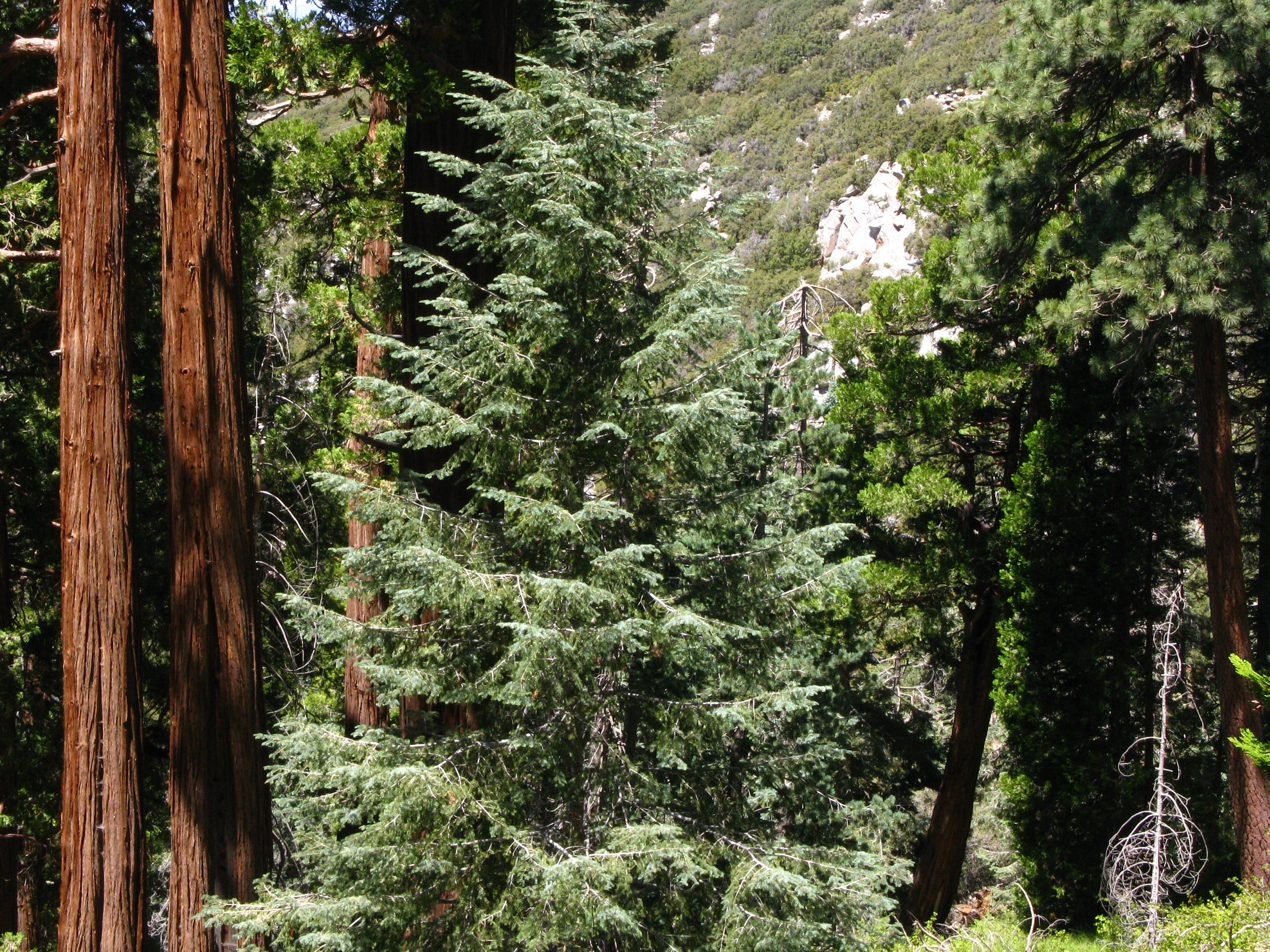

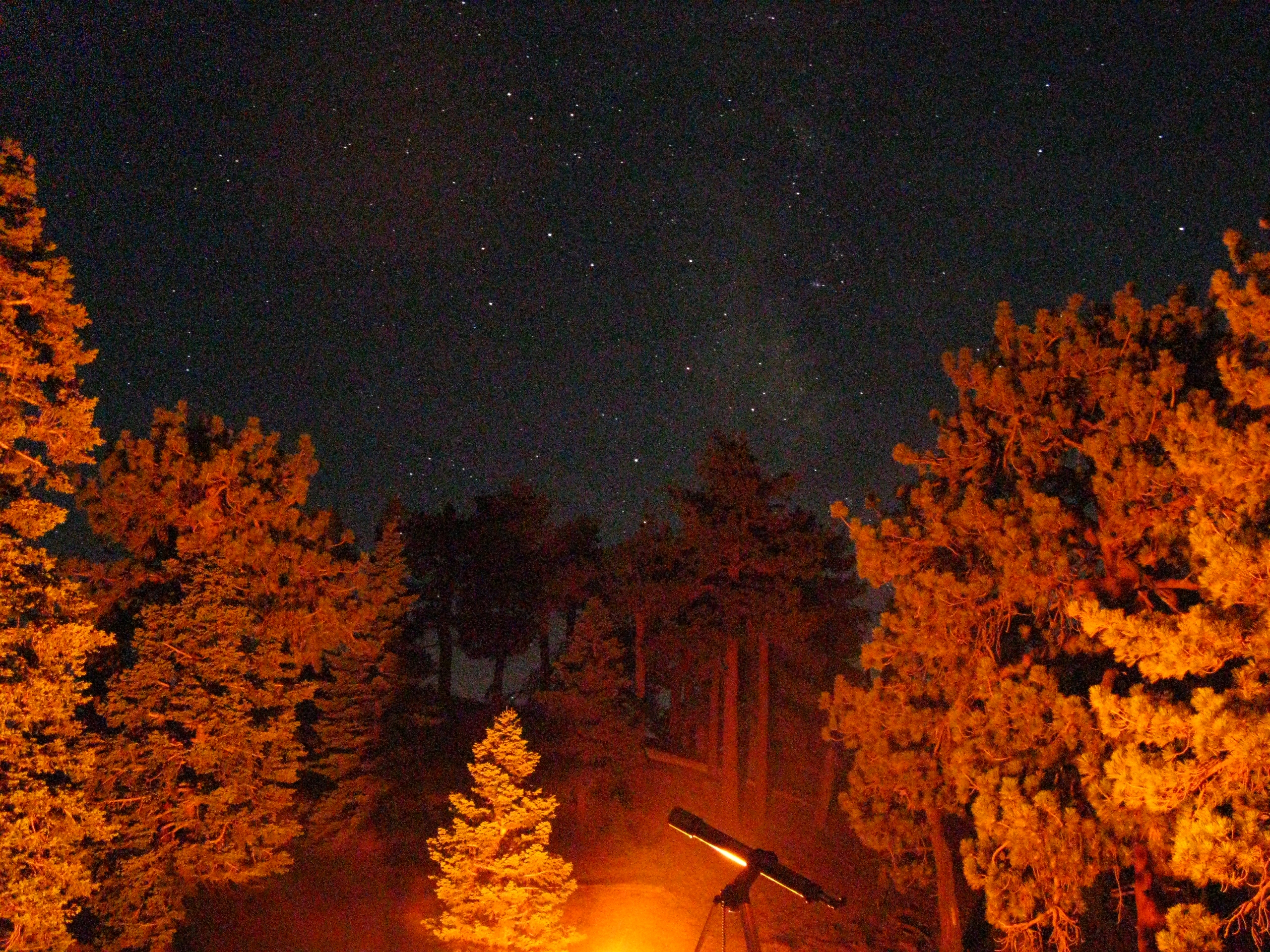

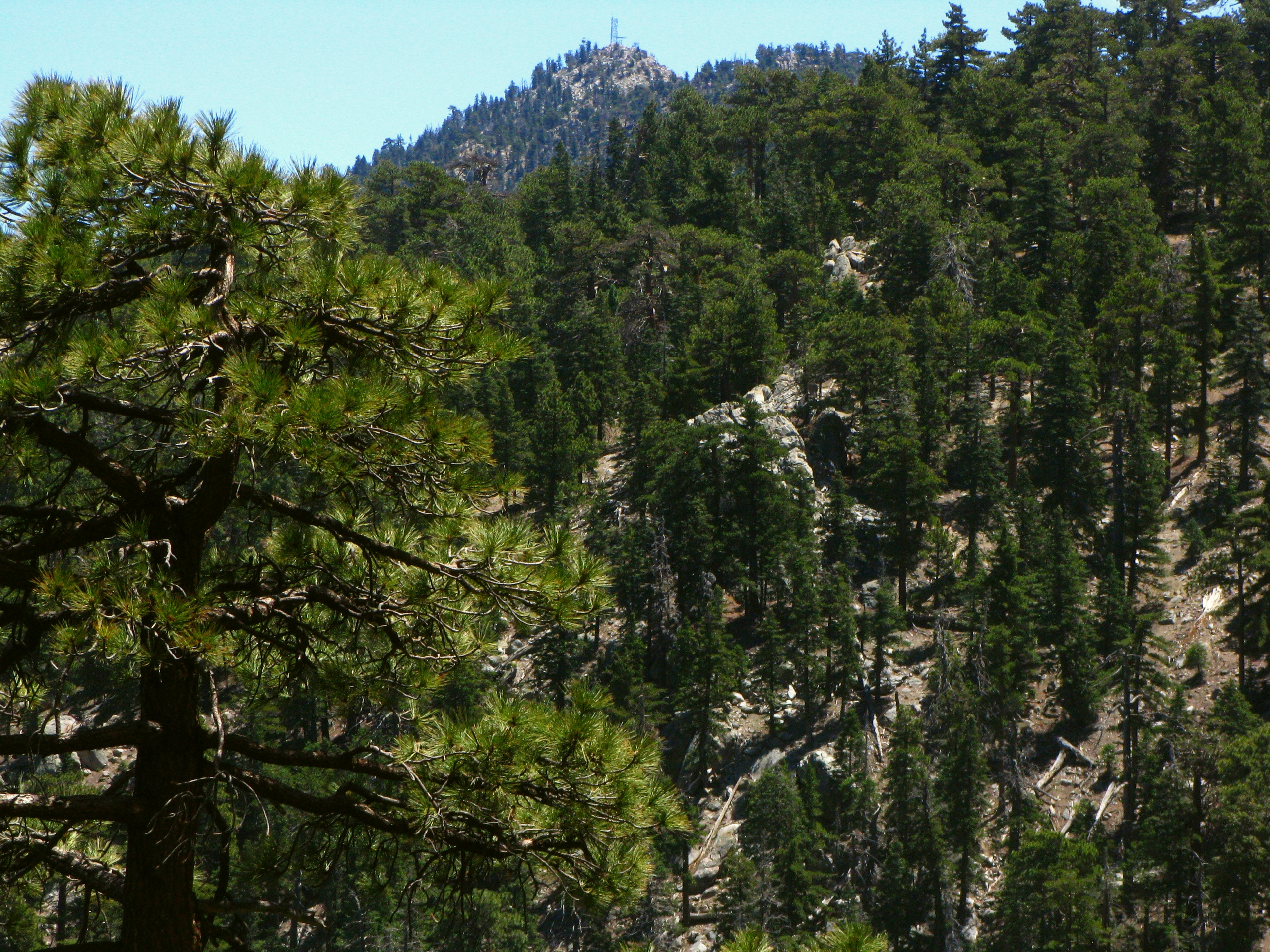

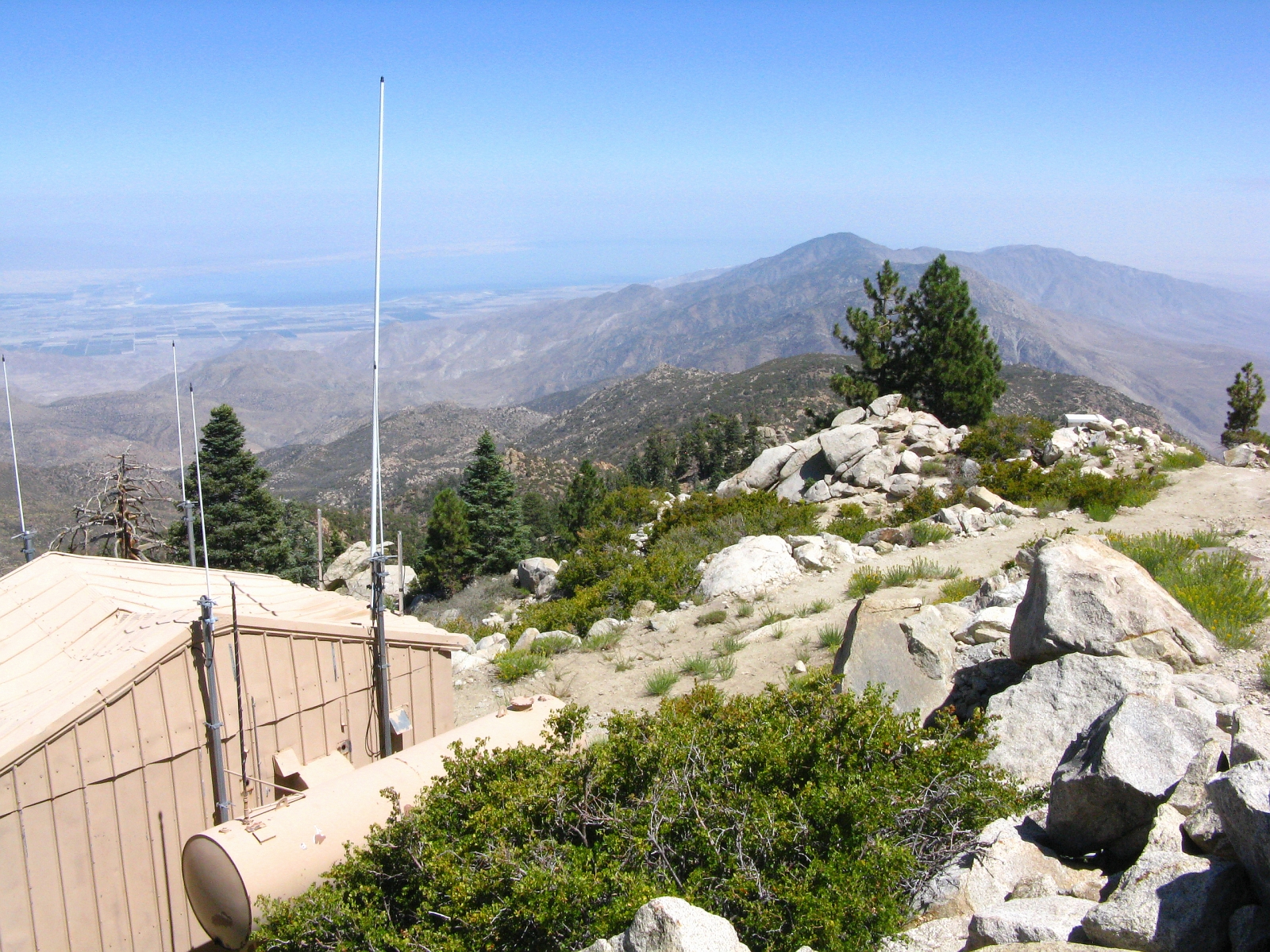

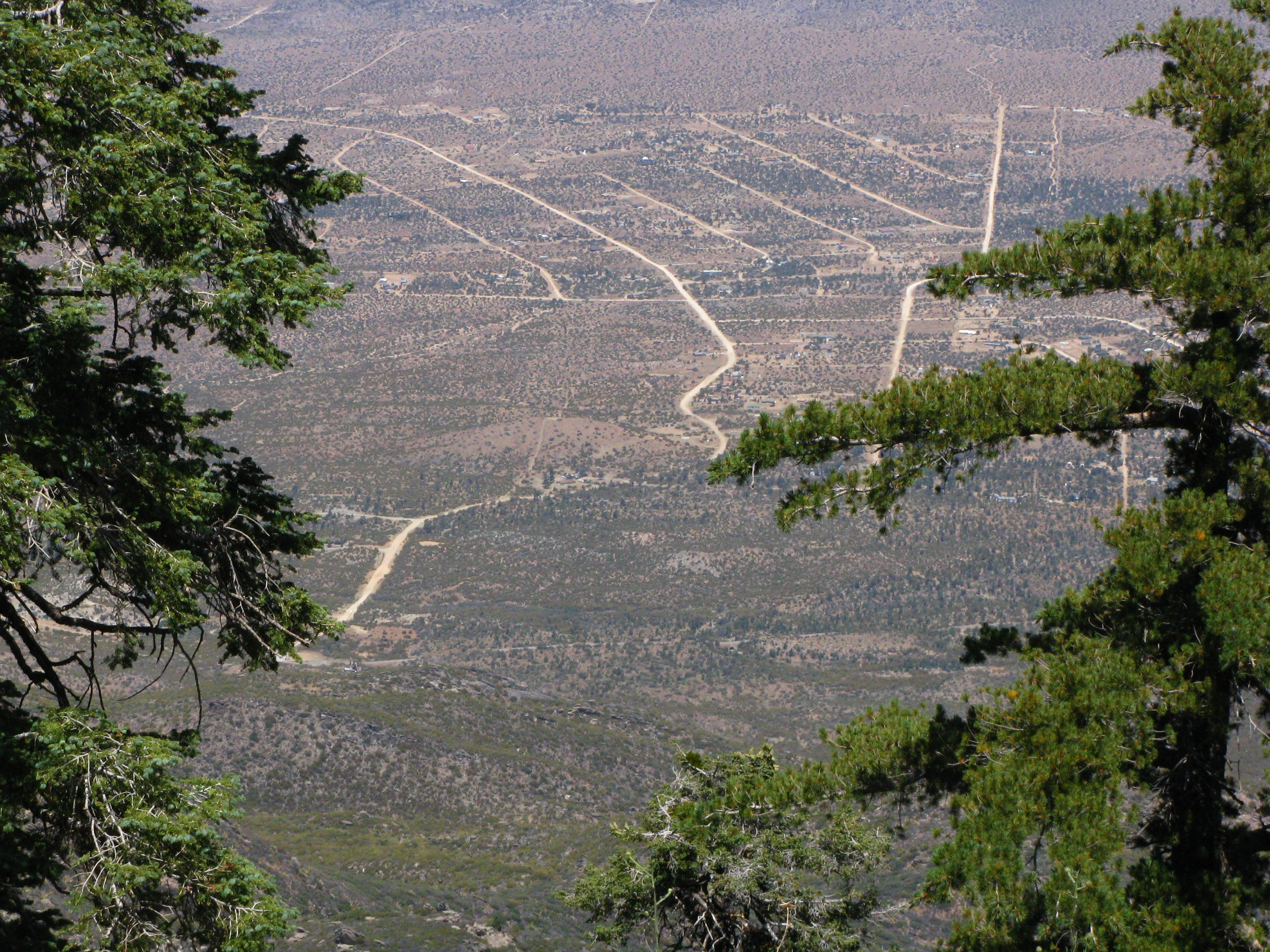

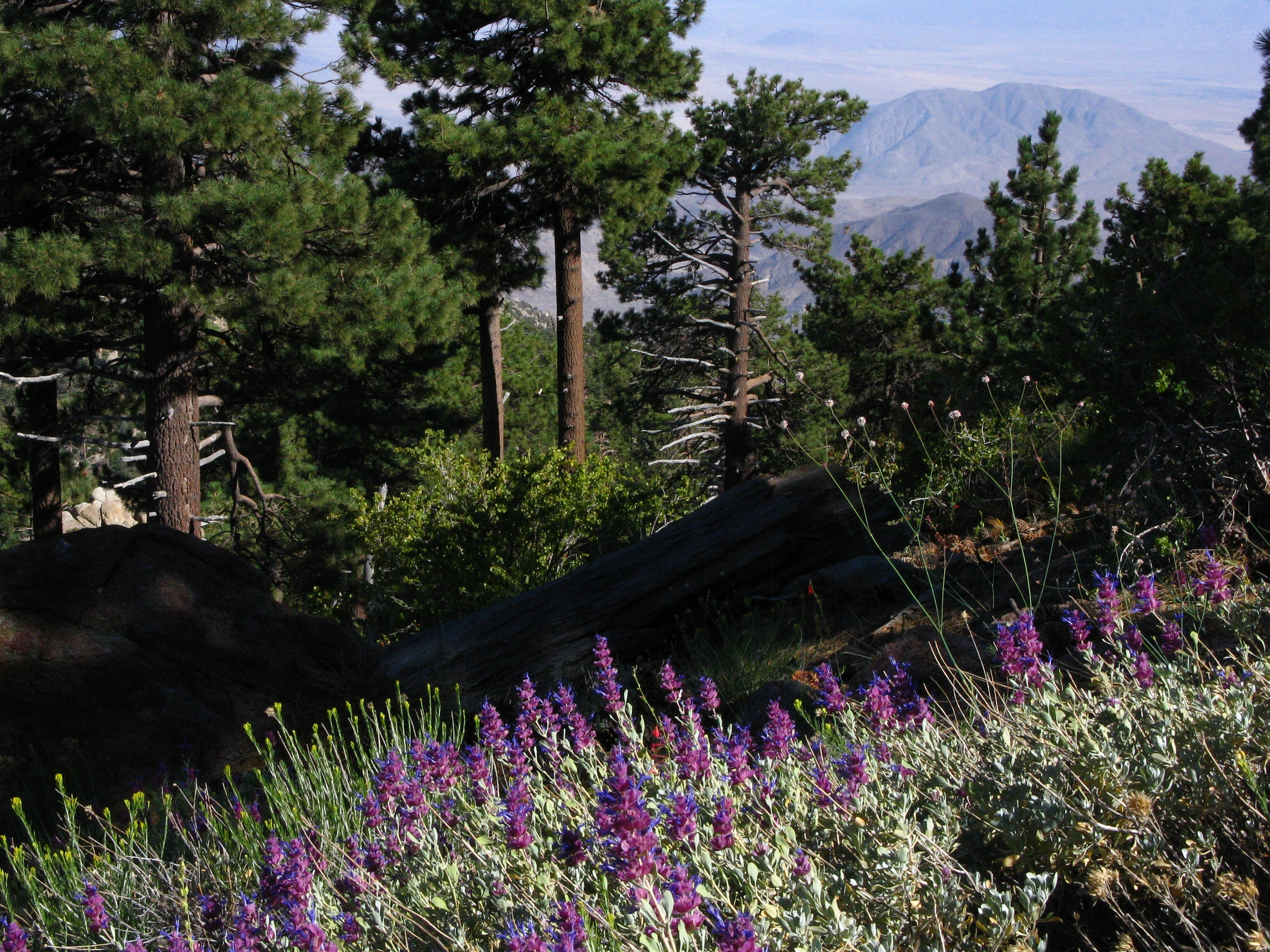

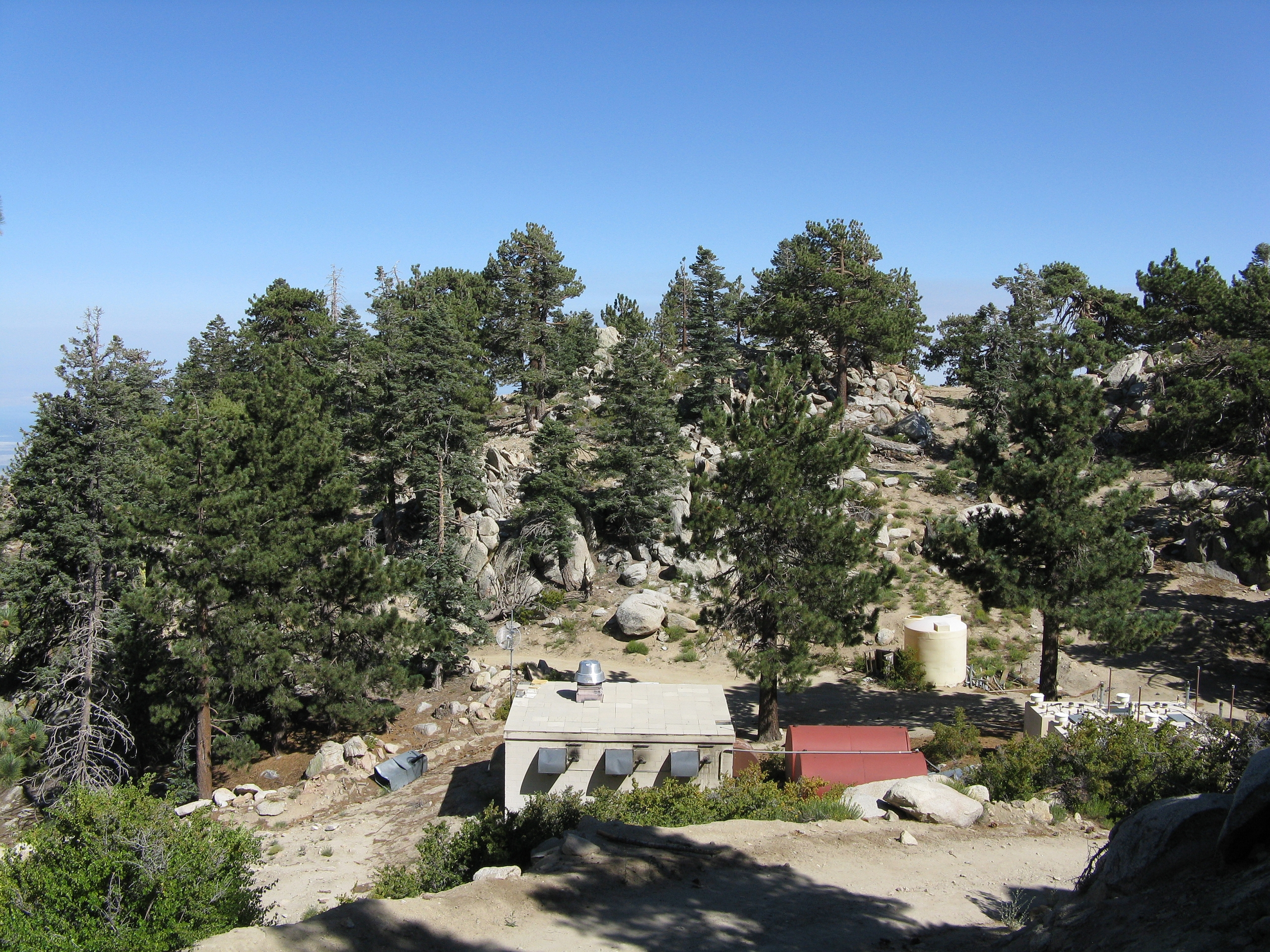
