= Martinez Mountain (Riverside County) =

Mountain summit in Riverside County, California

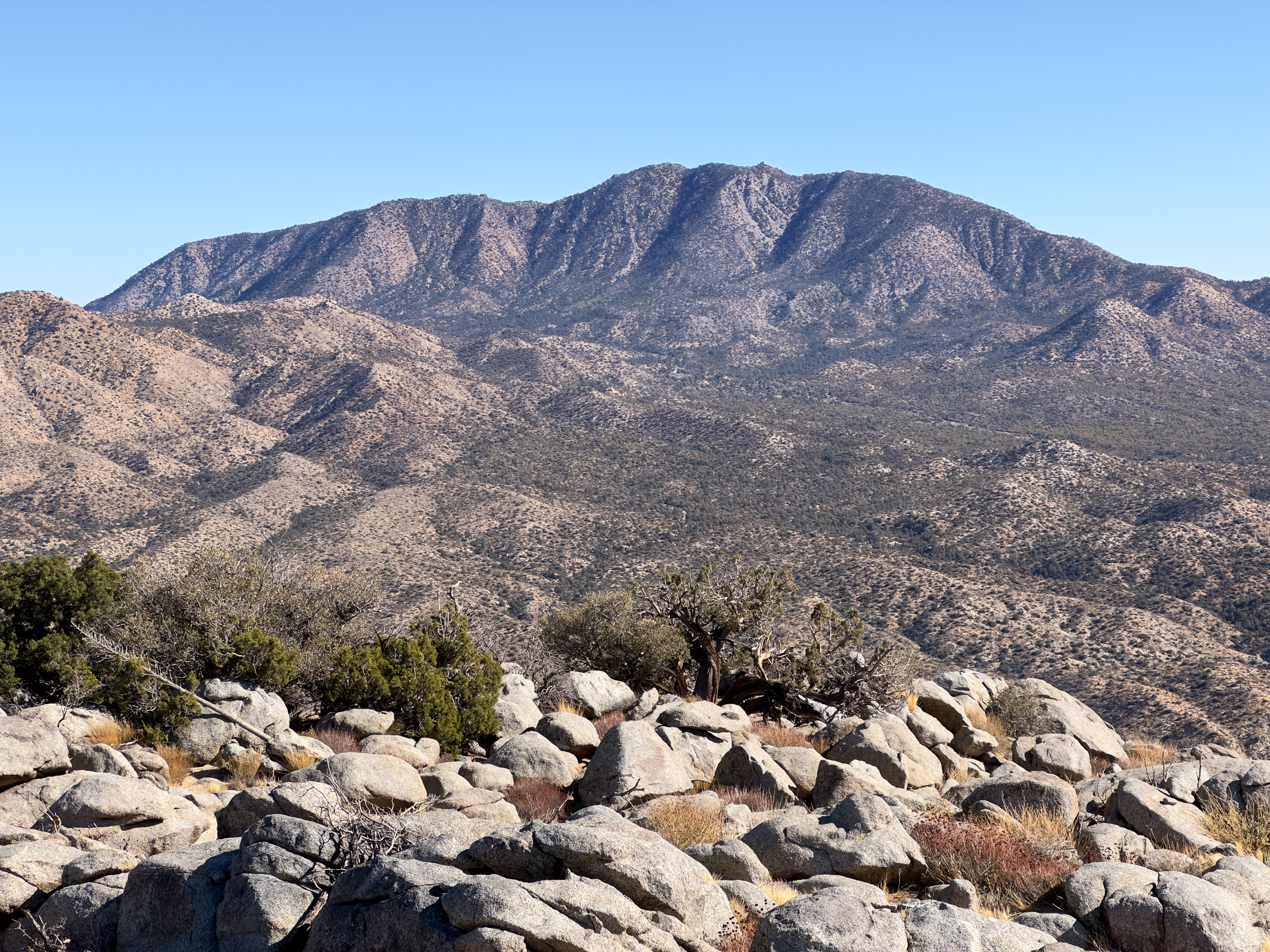
- A view of Martinez Mountain from Pinyon Crest

Highest point
- Elevation: 6,562 ft (2,000 m)

Geography
- Location within California
- Country: United States
- State: California
- County: Riverside County
- Range coordinates: 33°33′26.24″N 116°20′43.46″W
- Parent range: Santa Rosa Mountains

Martinez Mountain is a mountain summit of the Santa Rosa Mountains, in Riverside County, California.

== History ==
Martinez Mountain lies along a Cahuilla trail that was once used to get from the Coachella Valley to the Santa Rosa Mountains.

== Flora and fauna ==
Martinez Mountain is described as being a part of the Western Sonoran Mountain Woodland and Shrubland. Examples of flora include Singleleaf Pinyon, California Juniper and Mountain Mahogany. Herbivores include Bighorn sheep and Mule Deer, while predators include Mountain Lions and Coyotes.

== See also ==
- Mountains of Riverside County, California
