= Eriogonum evanidum =

Conservation status
- Critically Imperiled (NatureServe)

Scientific classification
- Kingdom: Plantae
- Clade: Tracheophytes
- Clade: Angiosperms
- Clade: Eudicots
- Order: Caryophyllales
- Family: Polygonaceae
- Genus: Eriogonum
- Species: E. evanidum

Binomial name
- Eriogonum evanidum Reveal

Species of wild buckwheat

Eriogonum evanidum is a rare species of wild buckwheat known by the common name vanishing wild buckwheat. It is native to southern California and Baja California, where it has been collected from widely scattered areas. Most historical occurrences are now extirpated. Some sources suggested that it was probably extinct, but living specimens were rediscovered in 2007.

== Description ==
This is an annual herb producing thin, erect stems about 10 or 20 centimeters tall surrounded at the base by small, woolly leaves up to a centimeter long by a centimeter wide. The flowering stem branches from the main stem and is a few centimeters long. It is studded with tiny clumps of yellowish flowers each around a millimeter long.

== Taxonomy ==
The plant was described as a new species by James Reveal in 2004 using specimens that were set aside from a collection of Eriogonum foliosum on the basis of some morphological characteristics. The specimens came from several locations in the southern California mountains, including Bear Valley in the San Bernardino Mountains and Pine Valley east of San Diego.

Herbarium accessions of the plant were made as early as 1893, and most documentation of the species took place between 1920 and 1940.

The species was presumed extinct until intensive surveys by the Rancho Santa Ana Botanic Garden (RSABG) in late summer and fall of 2007 and 2008 rediscovered the plant. It was found to be extant across its historic range in the United States, but the status of the Baja California population remains unknown.

=== Etymology ===
The species was given the name Eriogonum evanidum and the epithet "vanishing wild buckwheat" because at the time of its description it was presumed to be extinct due to a lack of observations.

== Conservation ==
The primary threats to this species include land development, recreation, and the proliferation of non-native plants. The occurrences of the plant near Big Bear Lake and Baldwin Lake were not located, meaning they were likely extirpated. Surveys at Warner Springs found no suitable habitat.
