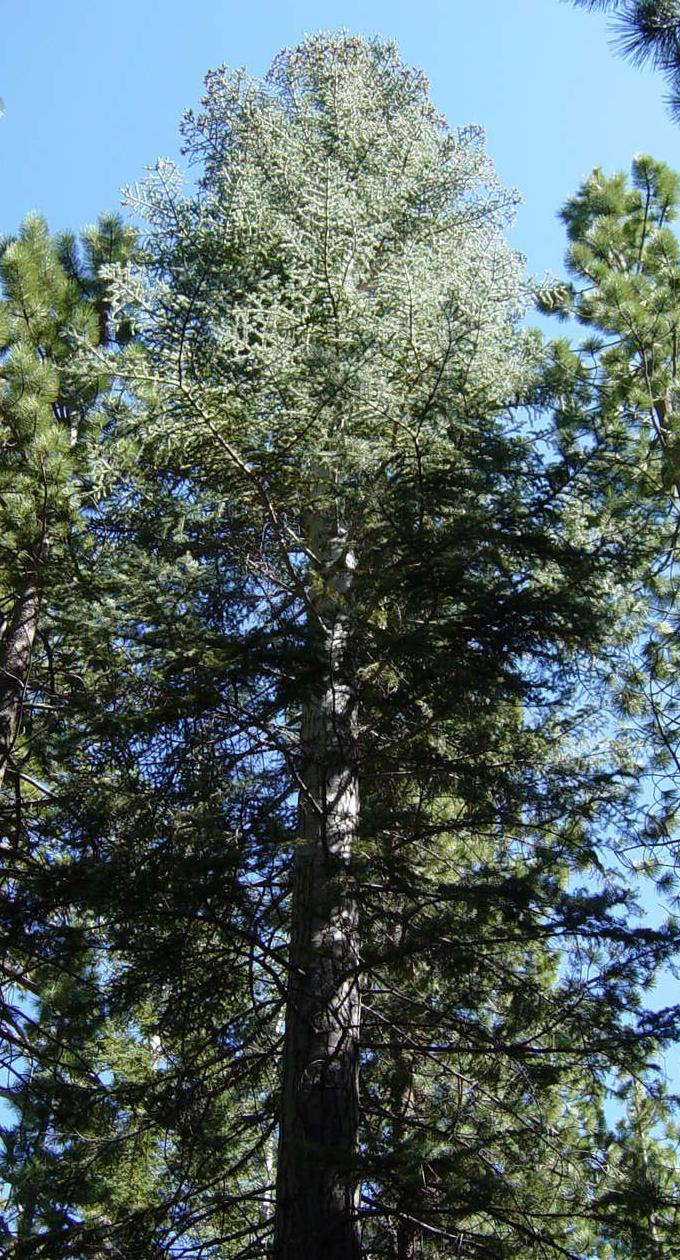
- Sierra Nevada white fir in Yosemite National Park

Conservation status
- Least Concern (IUCN 3.1)

- Secure (NatureServe)

Scientific classification
- Kingdom: Plantae
- Clade: Tracheophytes
- Clade: Gymnosperms
- Division: Pinophyta
- Class: Pinopsida
- Order: Pinales
- Family: Pinaceae
- Genus: Abies
- Species: A. concolor

Binomial name
- Abies concolor (Gordon & Glend.) Lindl. ex Hildebrand
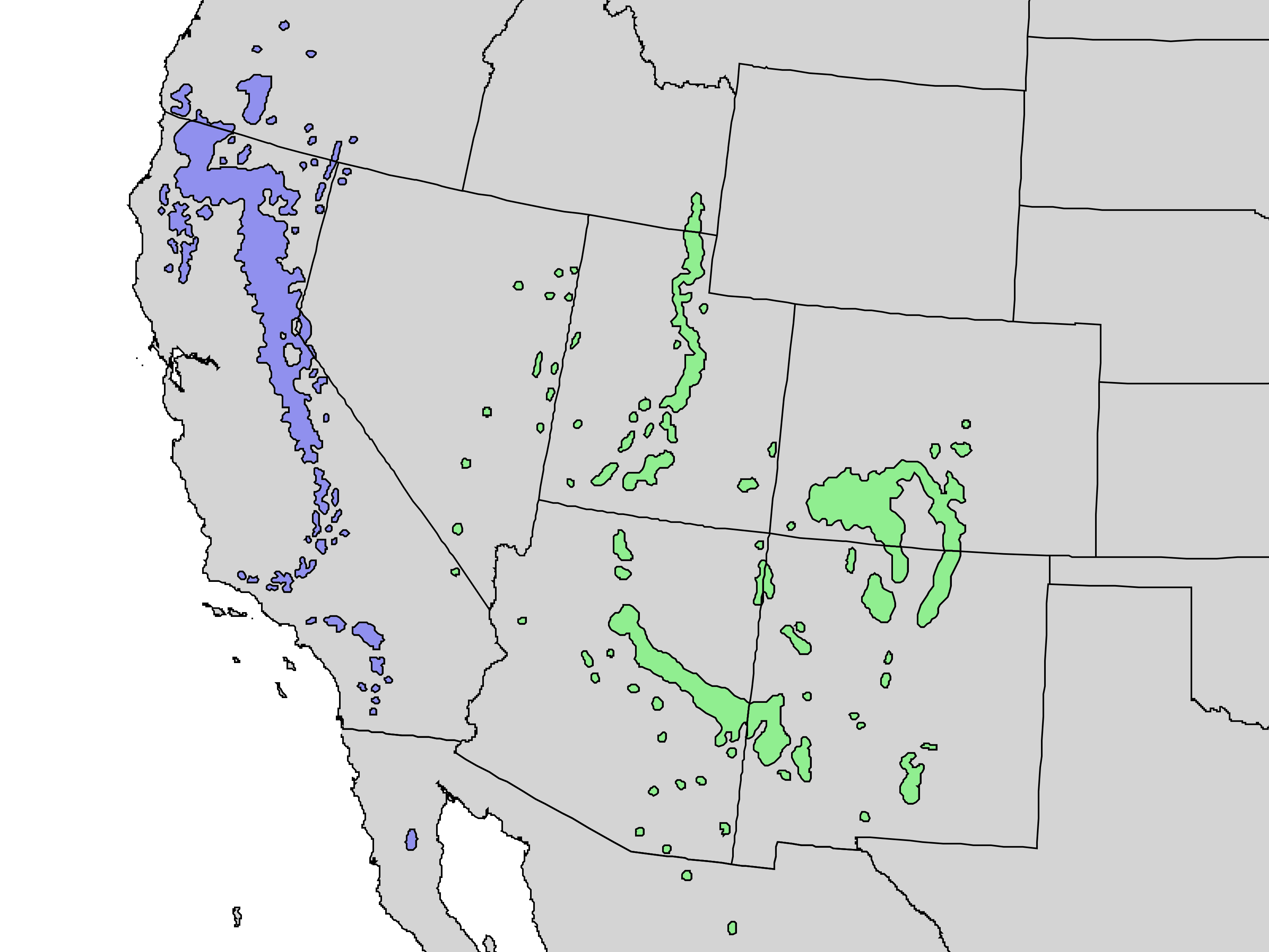
- Natural range of Abies concolor green - A. concolor var. concolor blue - A. concolor var. lowiana

Synonyms
- Abies concolor f. atroviolacea Cinovskis; Abies concolor subsp. lowiana (Gordon) A.E. Murray; Abies concolor var. bajacalifornica Silba; Abies concolor var. lowiana (Gordon) Lemmon; Abies concolor var. martinezii Silba; Abies grandis var. concolor (Gordon) A. Murray bis; Abies grandis var. lowiana (Gordon) Hoopes; Abies lasiocarpa var. pendula Carrière; Abies lowiana (Gordon) A. Murray bis; Abies lowiana var. pendula (Carrière) Fitschen; Abies lowiana var. viridula Debreczy & I. Rácz; Picea concolor Gordon & Glend.; Picea concolor var. violacea A.Murray bis; Picea grandis Newb.; Picea lowiana Gordon; Picea lowii Gordon; Picea parsonsiana Barron; Picea parsonsii Fowler; Pinus concolor Engelm. ex Parl.; Pinus concolor f. violacea (A.Murray bis) Voss; Pinus lowiana (Gordon) W.R. McNab

= Abies concolor =

Abies concolor White fir

Species of conifer tree

Abies concolor, the white fir, concolor fir, or Colorado fir, is a coniferous tree in the pine family Pinaceae. This tree is native to the mountains of western North America, including the Sierra Nevada and southern Rocky Mountains, and into the isolated mountain ranges of southern Arizona, New Mexico, and Northern Mexico. It naturally occurs at elevations between 900 and 3,400 meters (3,000 and 11,200 ft).

It is popular as an ornamental landscaping tree and as a Christmas tree.

== Description ==
This large evergreen conifer grows best in the central Sierra Nevada of California, where the record specimen was recorded as 74.9 meters (246 feet) tall and measured 4.6 m (15 ft) in diameter at breast height (dbh) in Yosemite National Park. The typical size of white fir ranges from 25–60 m (82–197 ft) tall and up to 2.7 m (8 ft 10 in) dbh. The largest specimens are found in the central Sierra Nevada, where the largest diameter recorded was found in Sierra National Forest at 58.5 m × 8.5 m (192 ft × 28 ft) (1972); the west slope of the Sierra Nevada is also home to the tallest specimen on record, 78.8 m (259 ft) in height. Abies concolor subsp. concolor (Rocky mountain white fir) rarely exceeds 38 m (125 ft) tall or 0.9 m (3 ft) dbh. Large (but not huge) trees in good soil range from 40 to 60 m (130 to 200 ft) tall and from 99 to 165 centimeters (39 to 65 in) dbh in California and southwestern Oregon and to 41 m (135 ft) tall and 124 cm (49 in) dbh in Arizona and New Mexico. The dead tree tops sometimes fork into new growth.

The gray bark is usually at least 10 cm (4 in) thick, and brown-hued inside. The leaves are needle-like, flattened, 2.5–8 cm (1–3 1/8 in) long and 2 millimeters (3/32 in) wide by 0.5–1 mm (1/64–3/64 in) thick, green to glaucous blue-green above, and with two glaucous blue-white bands of stomatal bloom below, and slightly notched to bluntly pointed at the tip. The leaf arrangement is spiral on the shoot, but with each leaf variably twisted at the base so they all lie in either two more-or-less flat ranks on either side of the shoot, or upswept across the top of the shoot but not below the shoot.

The cones are 6–12 cm (2 1/4–4 3/4 in) long and 4–4.5 cm (1 5/8–1 3/4 in) broad, green or purple ripening pale brown, with about 100–150 scales; the scale bracts are short, and hidden in the closed cone. The winged seeds are released when the cones disintegrate at maturity about 6 months after pollination.

White fir can live over 300 years.

=== Subspecies ===
As treated here, there are two subspecies; these are also variously treated at either the lower rank of variety by some authors, or as distinct species by others, or even without distinction at all.

Image	Name	Description	Distribution
	Abies concolor subsp. concolor — Colorado white fir or Rocky Mountain white fir	A smaller tree to 25–35 m (80–115 ft) tall, rarely 45 m (150 ft). Foliage blue-green, strongly upcurved to erect on all except weak, shaded shoots in the lower crown; leaves mostly 3.5–6 cm (1 3/8–2 3/8 in), and strongly glaucous on the upper side with numerous stomata. Tolerates winter temperatures down to about −40 °C (−40 °F).	In the United States, at altitudes of 1,700–3,400 m (5,600–11,200 ft) in the Rocky Mountains through Utah, Colorado, Arizona, and New Mexico. and on the higher Great Basin mountains of Nevada and extreme southeastern California, and a short distance into northern Sonora, Mexico.
	Abies concolor subsp. lowiana (syn. Abies lowiana) — Low's white fir or Sierra Nevada white fir	A larger tree growing to 40–60 m (130–195 ft) tall. Foliage flattened on lower crown shoots, the leaves often raised above the shoot on upper crown shoots but not often strongly upcurved; leaves mostly 2.5–5 cm (1–2 in), and only weakly glaucous on the upper side with few or no stomata. Tolerates winter temperatures down to about −30 °C (−22 °F). The United States Department of Agriculture plants database describes this subspecies as the full species Sierra white fir Abies lowiana (Gordon & Glend.) A. Murray bis.	In the United States, at altitudes of 900–2,300 m (3,000–7,500 ft) from the Cascades of Central Oregon south through California (Klamath Mountains, Sierra Nevada) to northern Baja California, Mexico.

== Botanical collection ==
White fir was first collected by Augustus Fendler on his expedition to the Santa Fe area of New Mexico in 1846–1847. Fendler's patron George Engelmann, a St. Louis area physician and botanist, then described the plant. This tree was first collected in California by William Lobb on his expedition to California of 1849–1853, after it was overlooked by David Douglas in his 1825–1827 expedition to the Pacific coast region.

The specific epithet concolor means "all one color", and refers to the leaves being glaucous both above and below.

== Distribution ==
This tree is native to the mountains of western North America from the southern Cascade Range in Oregon, south throughout California and into the Sierra de San Pedro Mártir in northern Baja California, and south throughout the Colorado Plateau and southern Rocky Mountains in Utah and Colorado, and into the isolated mountain ranges of southern Arizona, New Mexico, and Northern Mexico. It naturally occurs between 900 and 3,400 m (3,000 and 11,200 ft) above sea level.

== Ecology ==
White fir is very closely related to grand fir (Abies grandis), and intergrades with it in central Oregon. It is also suggested that all of subspecies lowiana has experienced genetic introgression from grand fir. White fir occupies a different niche than grand fir, including dryer and higher elevation sites, being more drought tolerant and having thicker, fire-resistant bark. In Mexico, it is replaced by further close relatives, Durango fir (A. durangensis) and Mexican fir (A. mexicana).

Like grand fir, white fir is more shade tolerant than Douglas fir, but less so than western hemlock and western redcedar. White fir is a climax species, which means the forest has reached complex maturity in forest succession in western coniferous forests of the U.S. White fir and yellow pine (ponderosa pine/Jeffrey pine) have co-existed for millennia in old growth forests throughout their range. In the presence of logging of large diameter trees and exclusion of cleansing wildfires, young trees have become abundant over the past two centuries. White fir had been regarded as a pest in the past by those in the lumber industry, but this opinion has changed. White fir is now one of the most important of all commercial softwoods according to the Western Wood Products Association.

The white fir trait of retaining lower limbs creates an escape route for medium-to-small forest birds (such as spotted owl) from larger flying predators and provides a drip zone around the roots for collecting moisture. The retained limbs can become a fuel ladder that allows flames to climb up to the canopy. Limbing-up white fir, instead of removing medium to large diameter trees, in areas where the public is more likely to start fires can help keep other trees and specifically giant sequoia from experiencing canopy fire. Recent concern for sequoia groves has caused agencies to call for removal of white fir in the Sierra Nevada. While sequoia seedlings and young saplings are highly susceptible to mortality or serious injury by fire; mature sequoias are fire adapted with: fire-resistant bark, elevated canopies, self-pruning lower branches, latent buds, and serotinous cones. The sequoia ecosystem is incomplete without the mixed pine/fir and oak that make up the mid and understory. Giant Sequoia's cones release seeds when the heat of fire triggers them to open while the thick bark protects the inner cambium from fire damage.

This tree is host to fir mistletoe (Phoradendron pauciflorum) and fir dwarf mistletoe (Arceuthobium abietinum), two species of parasitic plant. It is attacked by many types of insects, such as the fir engraver (Scolytus ventralis).

=== Dependent species ===
Mature white fir–yellow pine forests support old-growth dependent wildlife species such as California spotted owl (Strix occidentalis occidentalis), Mount Pinos sooty grouse (Dendragapus fuliginosus howardi), and Pacific fisher (Pekania pennanti). The spotted owl and fisher utilize cavities in decadent large-diameter white fir for nesting and denning. The Mount Pinos sooty grouse requires large diameter trees for thermal cover and its winter diet consists of mostly white fir and yellow pine needles. This subspecies of sooty grouse has been extirpated along with a significant number of large diameter white fir from much of its range. Other subspecies of sooty grouse also utilize Douglas fir, which does not occur in the range of Mount Pinos sooty grouse. Squirrel also frequent the tree's branches.

Deer browse the foliage of this species and porcupines chew the bark. Songbirds, grouse, and various mammals eat the seeds.

== Uses ==
White fir and grand fir were used by Native Americans for medicinal use involving powdered bark or pitch to treat tuberculosis or skin ailments. The Nlaka'pamux used the bark to cover lodges and make canoes. Branches were also used as bedding.

White fir is a preferred construction species because of its nail-holding ability, lightness in weight, and resistance to split, twist, and pitch. It is straight-grained, non-resinous, fine-textured, stiff, and strong.

It is popular as a Christmas tree and for Christmas decoration owing to its soft needles, generally excellent needle retention and abundance. It is often marketed as concolor or white fir.

=== Cultivation ===
White fir is widely planted as an ornamental tree in parks and larger gardens, particularly some cultivars of subsp. concolor selected for very bright glaucous blue foliage, such as cv. 'Violacea'. The dwarf cultivar 'Compacta', growing to a maximum height and spread of 2.5 m (8.2 ft), has gained the Royal Horticultural Society's Award of Garden Merit.

== Gallery ==
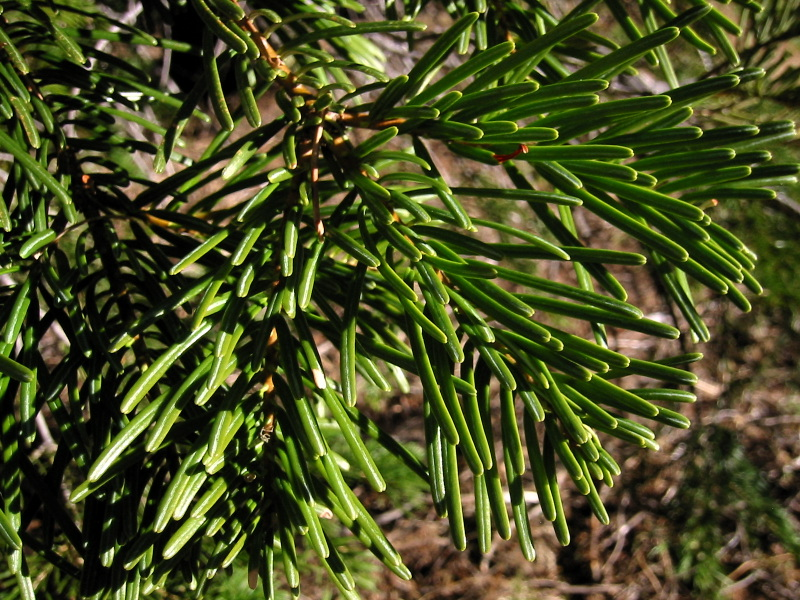
A. concolor subsp. lowiana foliage upperside

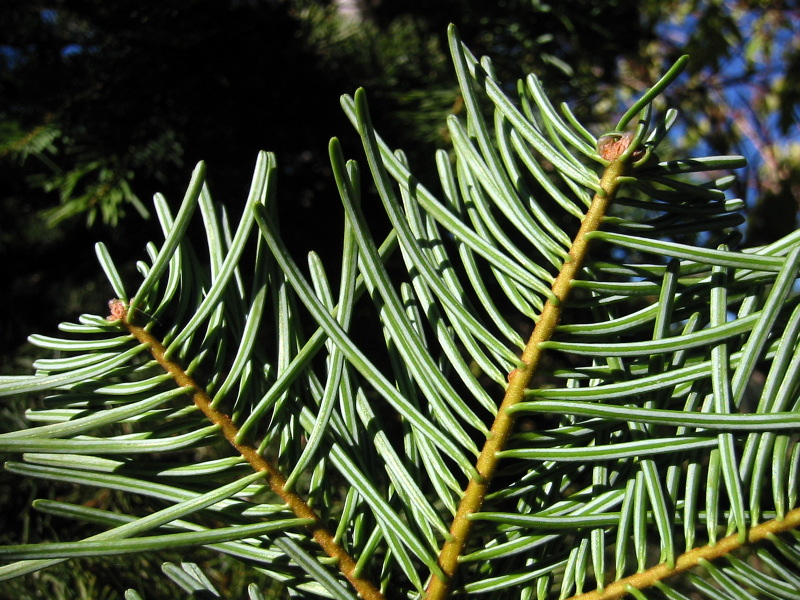
A. concolor subsp. lowiana foliage underside

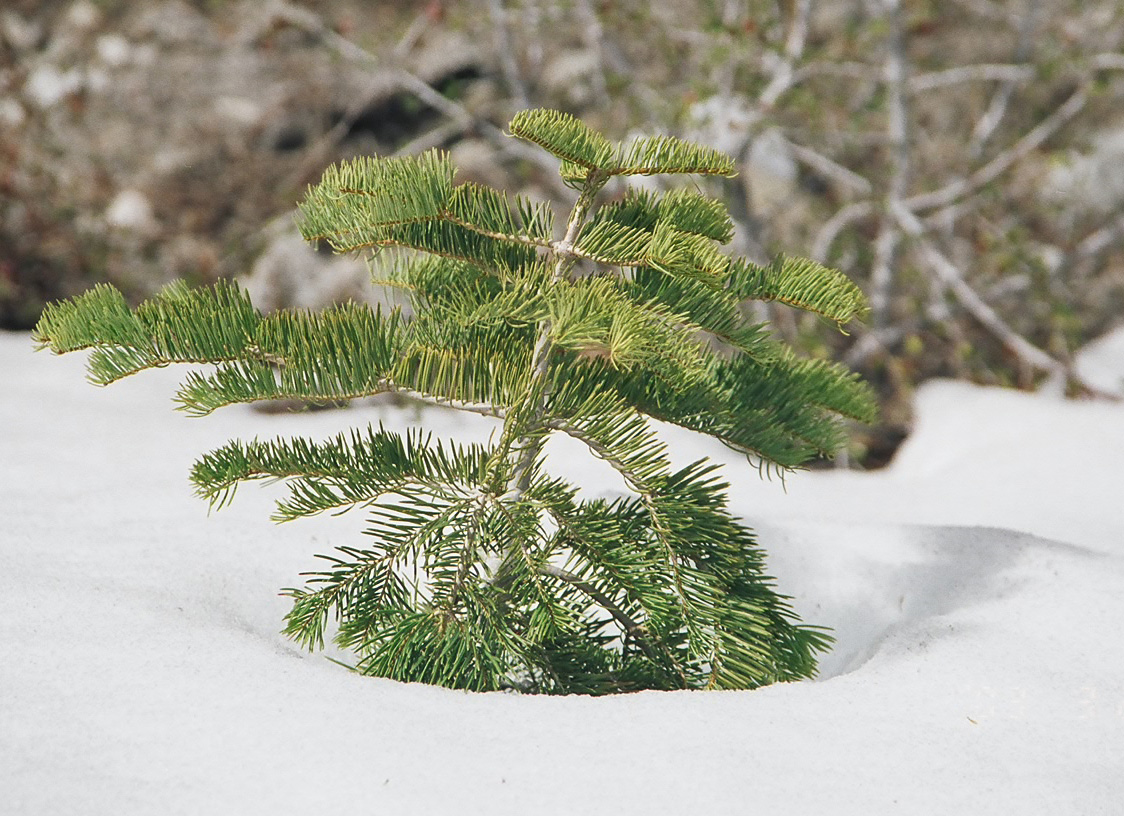
A young sapling of subsp. lowiana on Mount Whitney

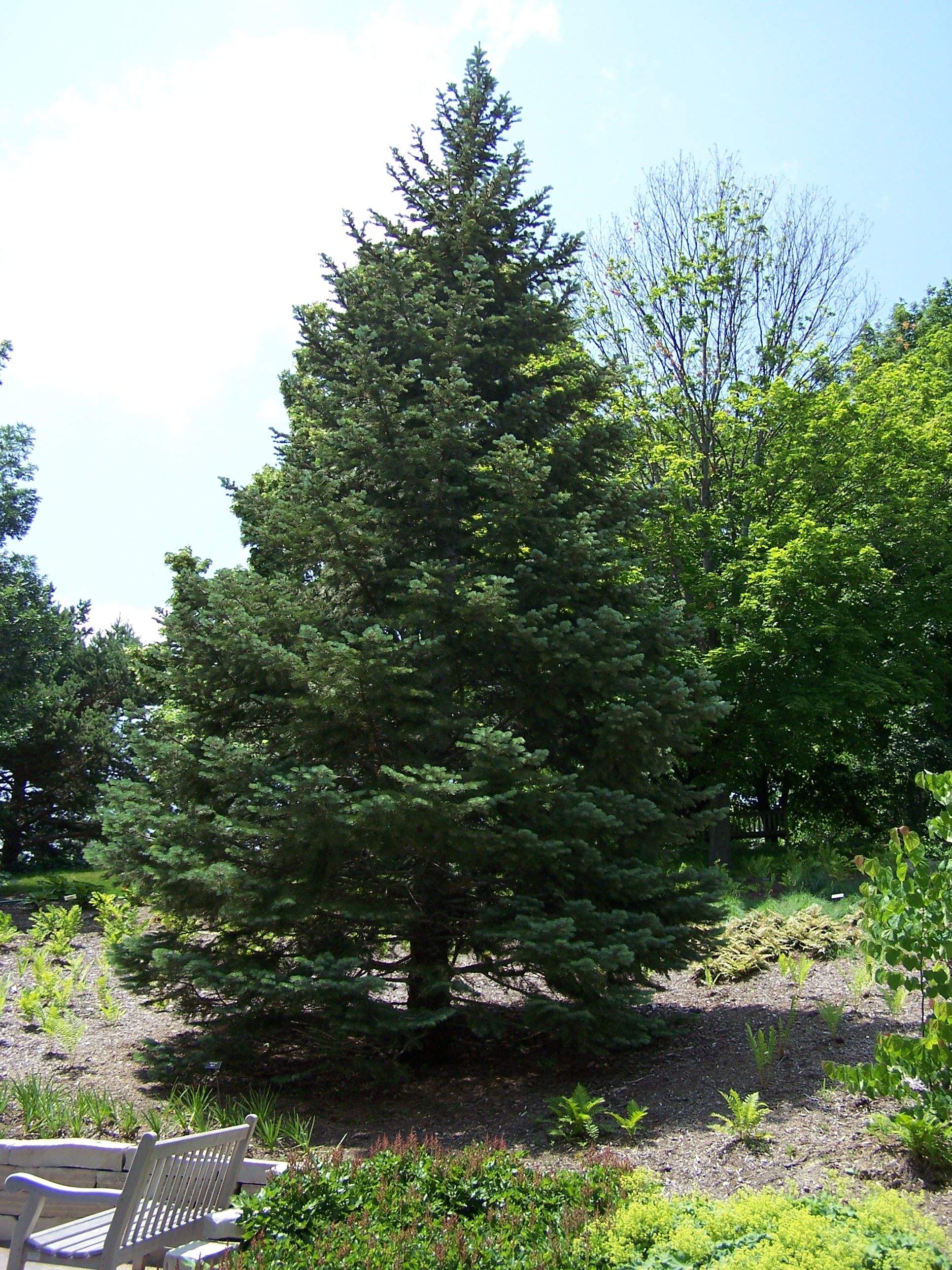
White fir in garden environment at Minnesota Landscape Arboretum

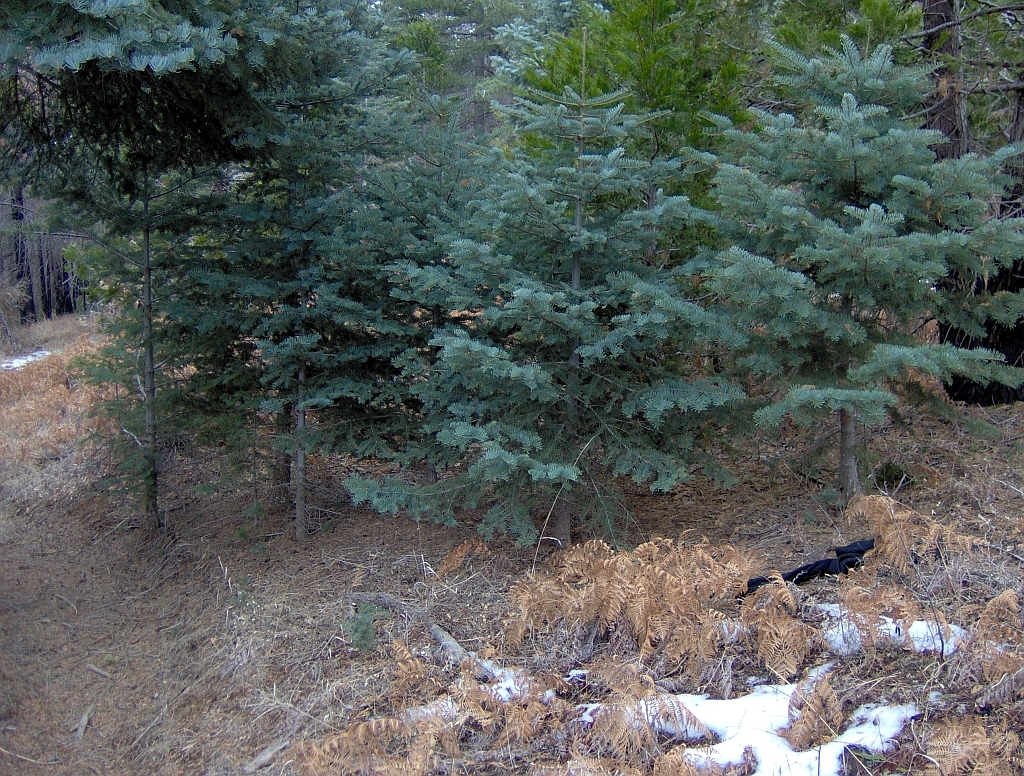
Small stand of young white firs on Cuyamaca Peak, California

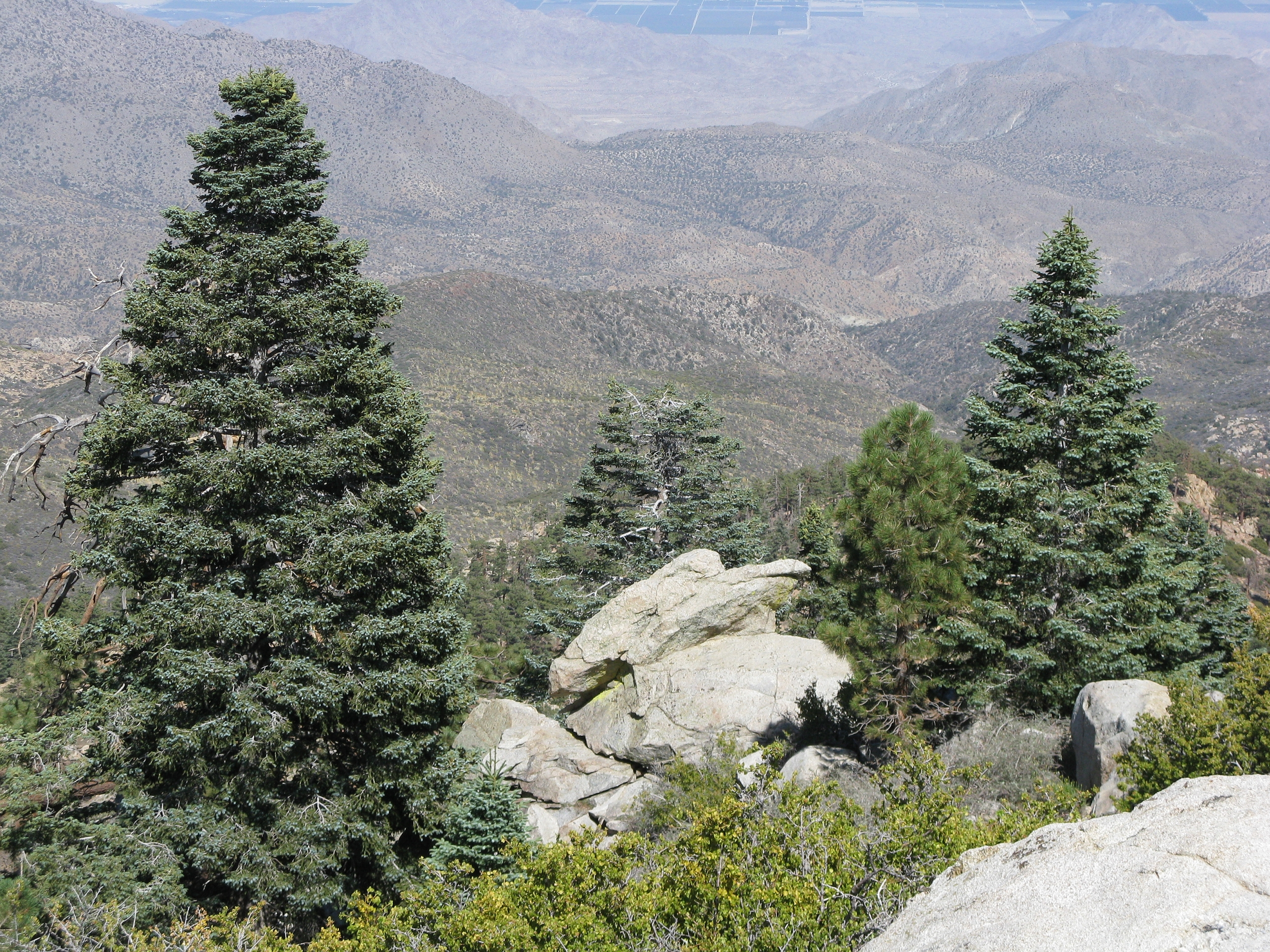
White firs at Toro Peak, California

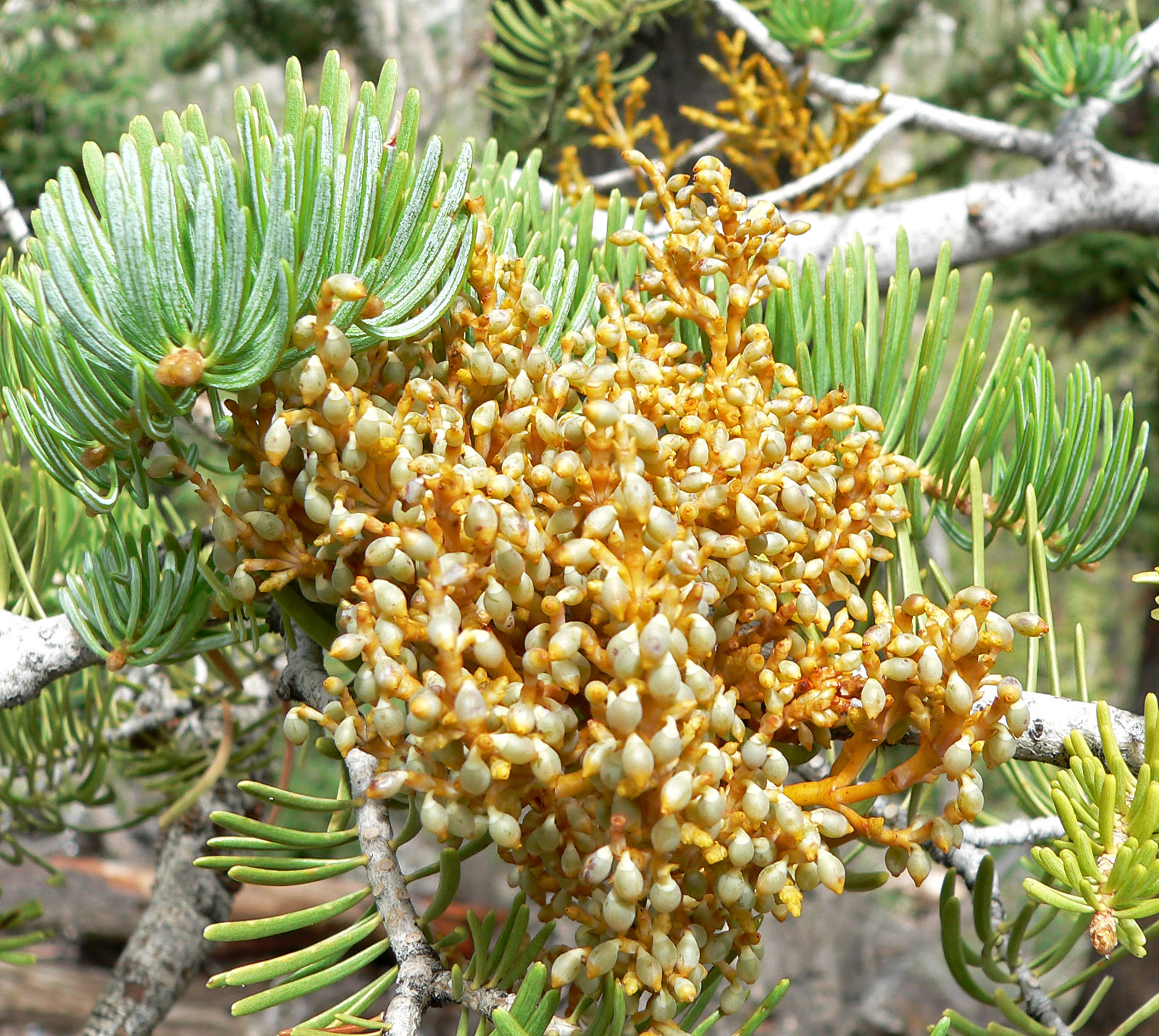
Foliage, with Arceuthobium abietinum infestation
