= Santa Rosa and San Jacinto Mountains National Monument =

Protected area in California

- IUCN category III (natural monument or feature)
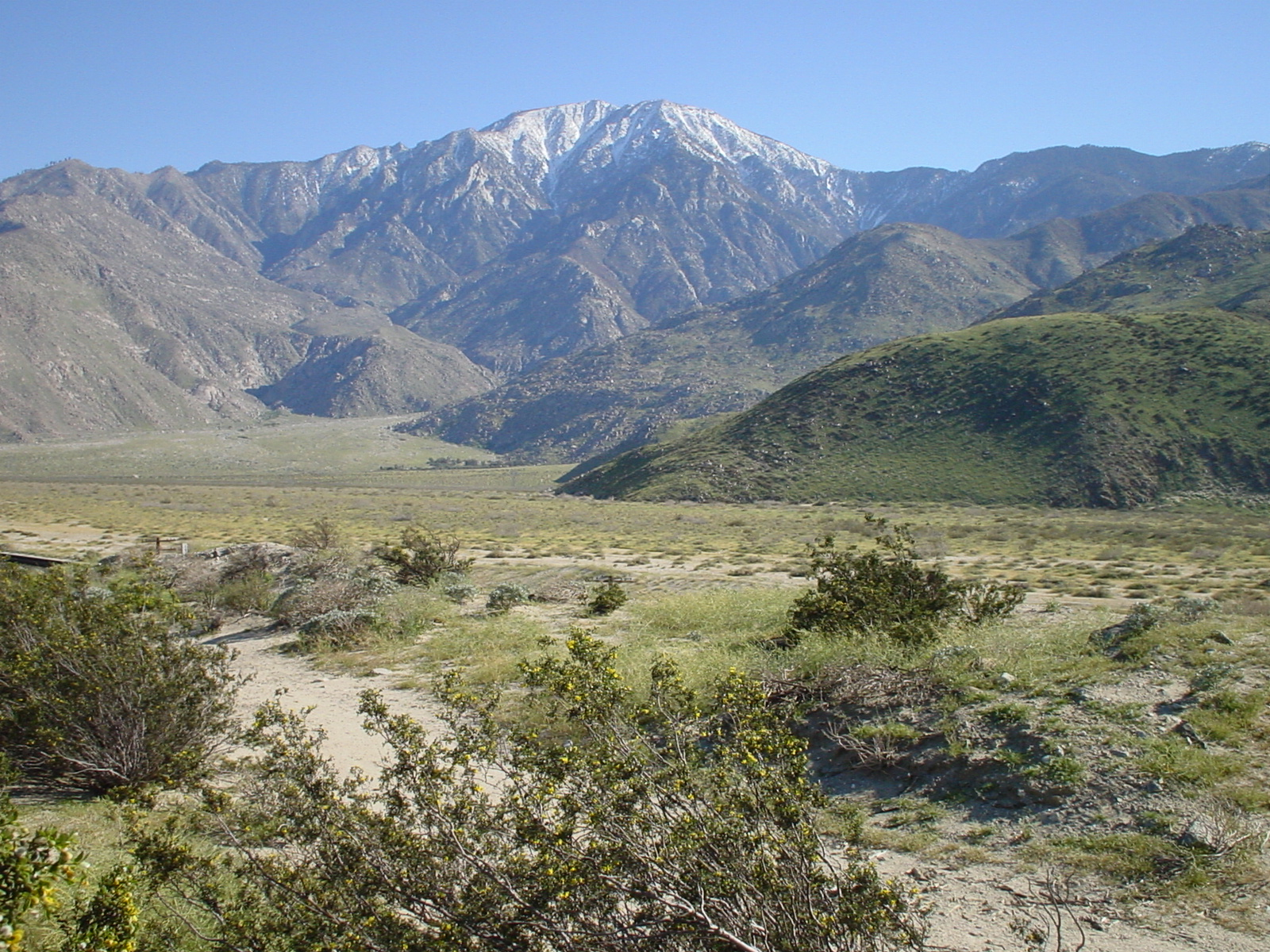

- Location within southern California Location within California Location within the United States
- Interactive map of Santa Rosa and San Jacinto Mountains National Monument
- Location: Riverside County, California, United States
- Nearest city: Palm Springs, CA (San Jacinto Mountains), Palm Desert, CA (Santa Rosa Mountains)
- Coordinates: 33°48′N 116°42′W
- Area: 280,071 acres (113,341 ha)
- Established: October 24, 2000
- Governing body: U.S. Forest Service; U.S. Bureau of Land Management
- Website: Santa Rosa and San Jacinto Mountains National Monument

The Santa Rosa and San Jacinto Mountains National Monument is a national monument in Southern California. It includes portions of the Santa Rosa and San Jacinto mountain ranges, the northernmost ones of the Peninsular Ranges system. The national monument covers portions of Riverside County, west of the Coachella Valley, approximately 100 miles (160 km) southeast of downtown Los Angeles.

== Description ==
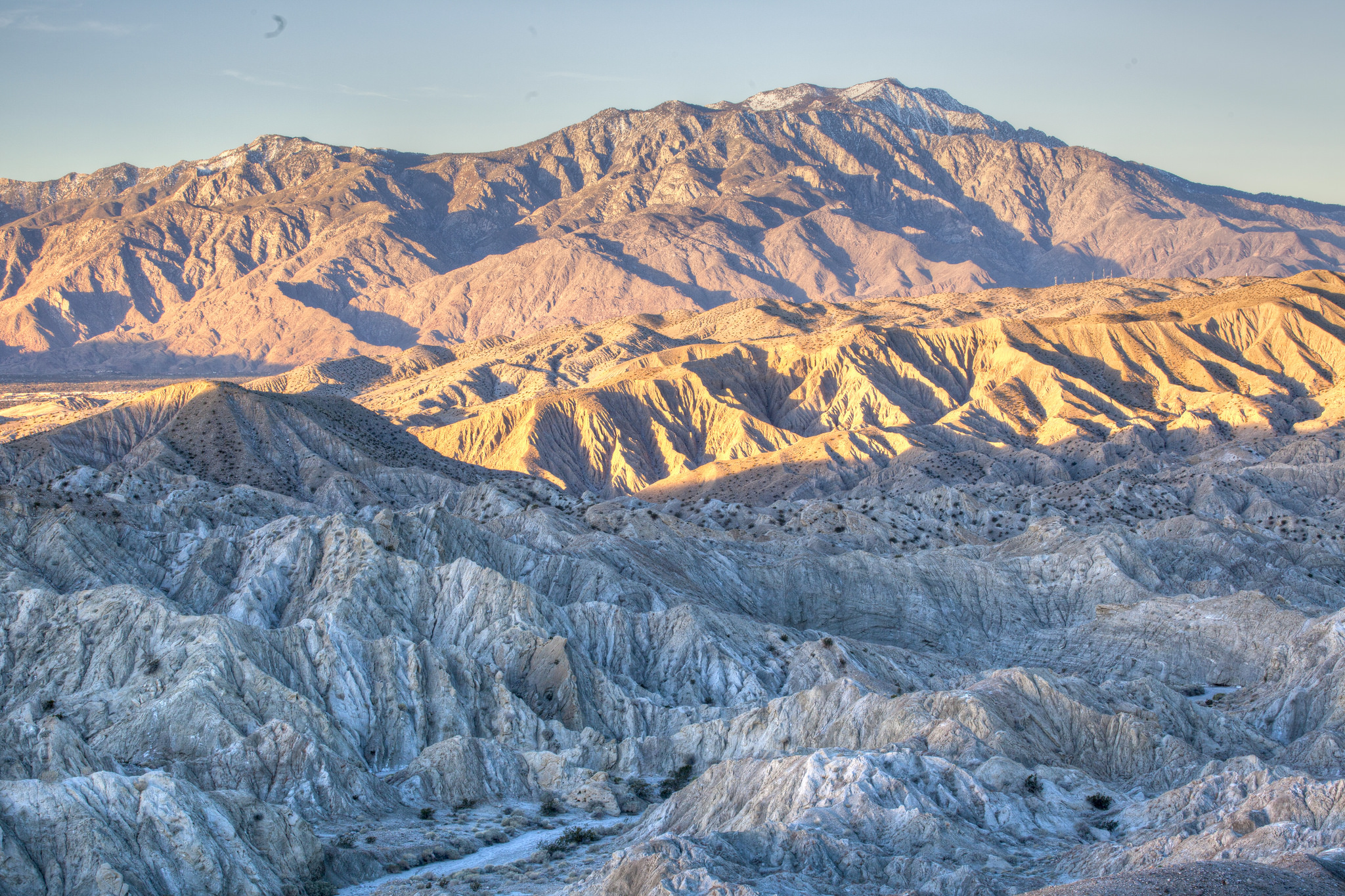
Landscape, Santa Rosa and San Jacinto Mountains National Monument

The Santa Rosa and San Jacinto Mountains National Monument was established in October 2000, through Congressional legislation (Public Law 106-351). It covers an area of 280,071 acres (113,341 ha). It is administered jointly by the US Bureau of Land Management (BLM) and U.S. Forest Service–San Bernardino National Forest (SBNF).

Many flora and fauna species within the national monument are state and federal listed threatened or endangered species, including the Peninsular Bighorn Sheep (Ovis canadensis cremnobates), a subspecies endemic to the Peninsular Ranges.

The Cahuilla peoples own substantial acreage within the monument, are one of the managing agencies, and have historic cultural sites and interests throughout the mountains.

More than 200 cultural resources have been recorded on federally managed lands within the monument, including the Martinez Canyon Rockhouse, which is listed on the National Register of Historic Places.

== Preservation history ==
Since the late 19th century, the area has been protected as public lands, beginning as forest reserves and then as part of the San Bernardino National Forest in 1925. In 1928, Mount San Jacinto State Park was established and has 8,614 acres (34.86 km^{2}) within the national monument boundary. In 1917 and 1927, state game refuges were established on both the Santa Rosa and San Jacinto Mountains. In the 1960s, the state agency California Department of Fish and Game began to set aside special areas called ecological reserves to protect certain species and habitats, and there are now three reserves with 28,900 acres (117 km^{2}) of state reserve lands in the monument. Other state agencies involved in conservation of the area include the Philip L. Boyd Deep Canyon Desert Research Center (part of the University of California Natural Reserve System) and the Coachella Valley Mountains Conservancy. In addition, the 1964 Wilderness Act established the San Jacinto Wilderness, and in 1984, the California Desert Protection Act added the Santa Rosa Wilderness in the Colorado Desert section of the Sonoran Desert. Other agencies include local and tribal governments that have habitat conservation plans, including the Habitat Conservation Plan addition to the Cahuilla Tribal Conservation Program. Private conservation organizations, such as The Nature Conservancy, American Land Conservancy, and Friends of the Desert Mountains, have also contributed to the protection of the mountains through land purchases and acquisitions.

== Landscape, vegetation, and wildlife ==
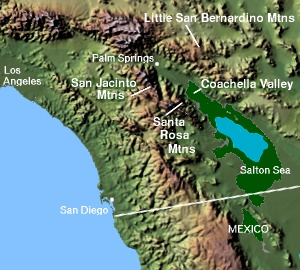
California section of the Peninsular Range

The monument is oriented northwest to southeast along the edge of the broad Coachella Valley, and the terrain rises sharply from below sea level to nearly 11,000 feet (3,400 m). These mountains are a part of the Peninsular Range Province, which extends from the Baja Peninsula in Mexico to the San Jacinto Mountains in California. San Jacinto Peak is the highest point in the Peninsular Range Province and has one of the steepest fault-block escarpments in North America.

The differences in elevation, temperature, and moisture give rise to diverse vegetation. Being the western boundary of the Sonoran Desert, the eastern mountainslopes are hotter and drier, while the western side is affected by the Pacific Ocean and receives more precipitation with cooler temperatures. There are several major vegetation areas ranging from sand dunes/sand fields, chaparral, and mesquite to riparian zones of willow and cottonwood, desert fan palm oasis woodland, and pinyon pine woodland, with the highest elevations supporting lodgepole pine timberline forest.

Another factor influencing plant and animal species is the "island" aspect of the San Jacinto Mountains and the Peninsular Range, the unique isolation of the landform on three sides-the Pacific Ocean to the west, the Salton Trough/desert environment to the east, and the San Gorgonio Pass to the north. Biologists believe that this isolation has contributed to evolution of subspecies such as the San Diego mountain kingsnake.

California fan palm (Washingtonia filifera) groves, part of the natural community of oasis riparian woodland, are located at permanent water sites of both Santa Rosa and San Jacinto Mountains. The fan palm is a relict species, although not listed under the Endangered Species Act. Associated plants in the oasis woodland include honey mesquite (Prosopis glandulosa), arrow weed, and deer grass.

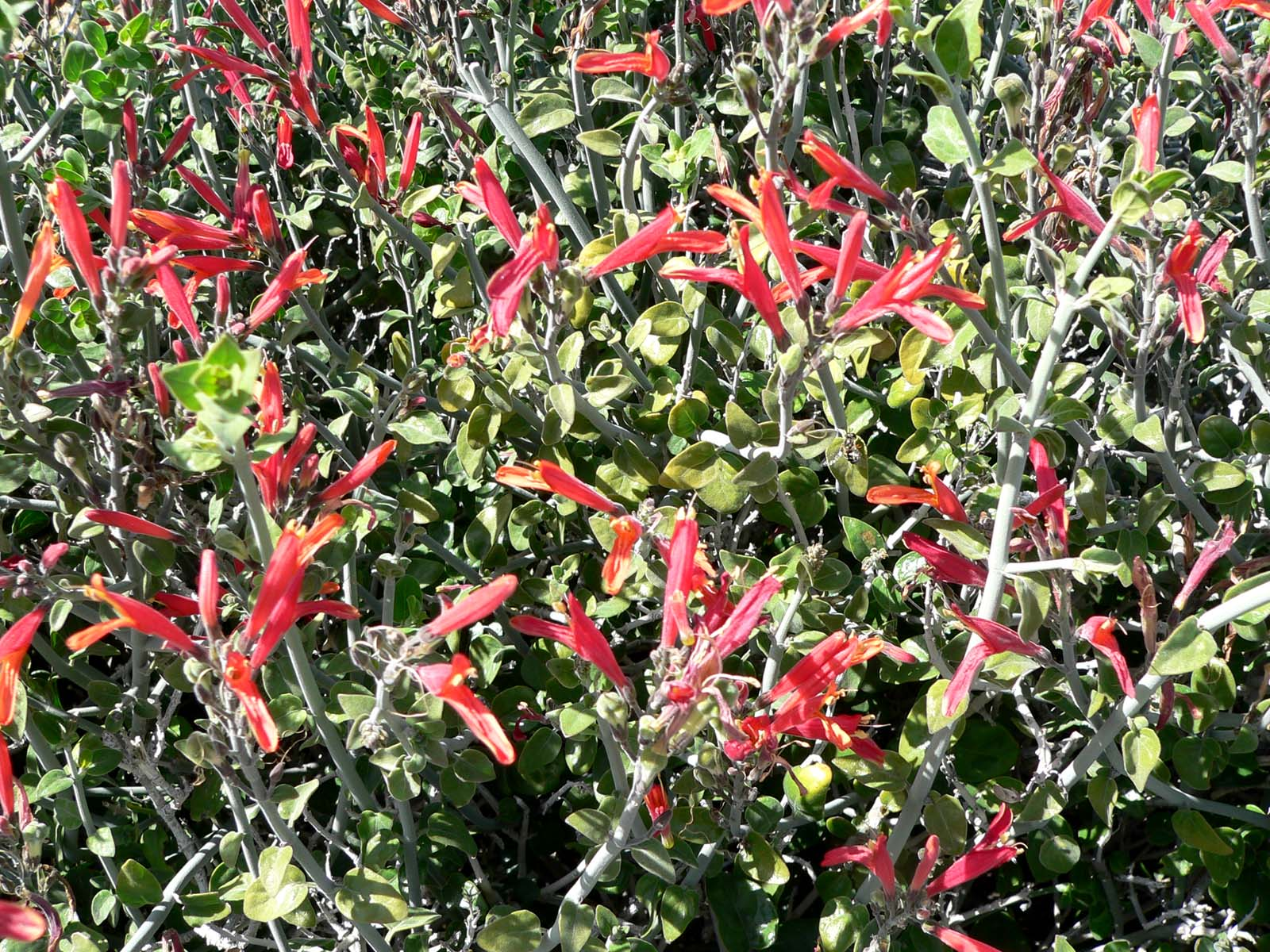
Justicia californica in the Santa Rosa Mountains

The largest plant category in the national monument is collectively known as desert scrub and includes Sonoran Cresosote Scrub and Sonoran Mixed Woody and Succulent Scrub vegetation communities. Desert scrub occupies more than 160,000 acres (650 km^{2}) and consists of creosote bush (Larrea tridentata), burrobrush (Ambrosia dumosa), cacti, and other stem succulents. Desert scrub is found on the alluvial fans and intermountain bajadas, growing on coarse, well-drained soils. Wildlife of the desert scrub plant community includes the federally protected Peninsular Ranges bighorn sheep (Ovis canadensis nelsoni) and the desert tortoise (Xerobates agassizii syn. Gopherus agassizii).

On both sides of the mountains, montane coniferous forest occurs from around 5,500 to 9,000 ft (1,700 to 2,700 m) in elevation. Vegetation in this area includes Jeffrey pine, ponderosa pine, incense cedar, and sugar pine.

Rare plants in the national monument include Hidden Lake bluecurls (Trichostema austromontanum ssp. compactum), a plant federally listed as threatened in 1998 and found at a single vernal pool site. Others include Nuttall's scrub oak, desert sand verbena, and vanishing wild buckwheat.

There are nineteen species endemic to the Santa Rosa and San Jacinto Mountains National Monument area. These species require or are restricted to a small geographical area which makes them vulnerable to habitat disturbance. A few of these species are Johnston's rockcress, Casey's June beetle, Coachella Valley round-tailed ground squirrel, Munz's mariposa lily, San Jacinto bush snapdragon, Santa Rosa Mountain linanthus, Tahquitz ivesia, and Ziegler's aster.

The Bureau of Land Management lists eight animal species within the monument as endangered, threatened, or rare. Of these, all but one are federally listed with the southern rubber boa being state-listed as threatened. In addition to the Peninsular bighorn sheep and the desert tortoise, some of these protected wildlife include the Coachella Valley fringe-toed lizard and the southwestern willow flycatcher.

== Management and recreation ==
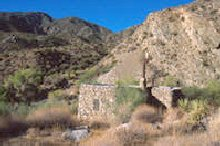
Historic Jack Miller's cabin. NRHP-listed as Martinez Canyon Rockhouse.

The Santa Rosa and San Jacinto Mountains National Monument is managed by a mosaic of entities, including the Bureau of Land Management (89,500 acres (362 km^{2})), US Forest Service (65,000 acres (260 km^{2})), Cahuilla peoples (19,800 acres (80 km^{2})), California Department of Parks and Recreation (12,900 acres (52 km^{2})), other State of California agencies (36,400 acres (147 km^{2})), and privately (38,500 acres (156 km^{2})). Most of the common recreational uses of hiking, mountain biking, horseback riding and camping are allowed, with the exception of special areas such as ecological reserves and essential bighorn sheep habitat. The Pacific Crest Trail traverses the western part of the national monument and is one of the nation's first National Scenic Trails established by the National Trails System Act (Public Law 90-543). This segment of the trail is managed by the US Forest Service and Bureau of Land Management through a Memorandum of Understanding (MOU).

The National Monument legislation (introduced on February 16, 2000, by Congresswoman Mary Bono) authorized the establishment of a management plan that included cooperative agreements with existing organizations, such as that of the Cahuilla peoples and the University of California, as well as maintaining most of the historical land uses, except mining and geothermal activities.

== See also ==
- List of national monuments of the United States
- Anza-Borrego Desert State Park – located on the southern side of the monument
- Mojave and Colorado Deserts Biosphere Reserve
- List of flora of the Sonoran Desert Region by common name
- Tahquitz (spirit)

== Notes ==
=== References ===
- Santa Rosa and San Jacinto Mountains National Monument Resource Management Plan and Final Environmental Impact Statement Bureau of Land Management February 2004.
- Santa Rosa and San Jacinto Mountains National Monument Act of 2000, July 17, 2000. Report 106-750.
