= Santa Rosa Mountains =

Mountain range in California

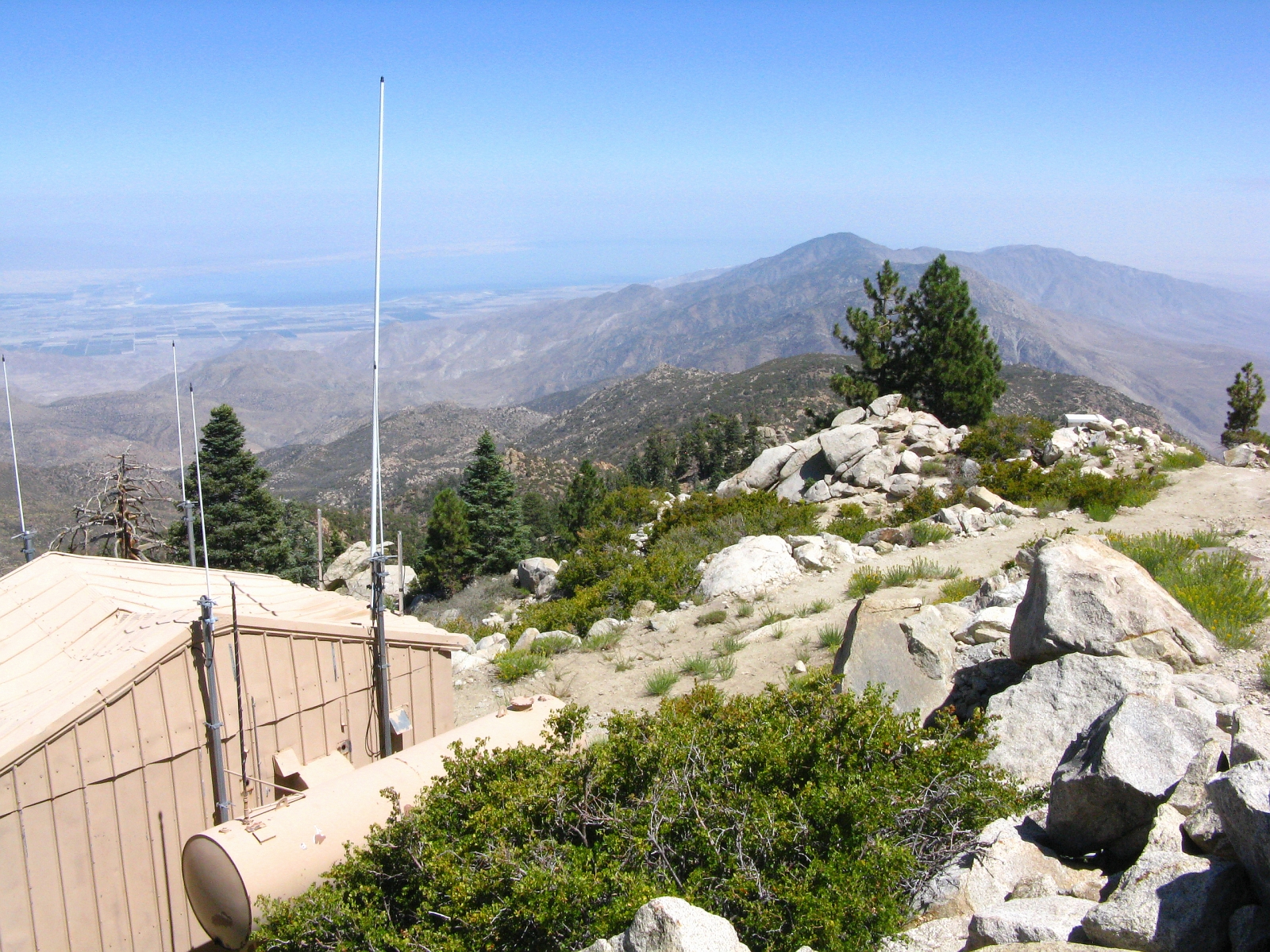
- Toro Peak, the highest point of the Santa Rosa Mountains

Highest point
- Peak: Toro Peak
- Elevation: 2,657 m (8,717 ft)

Geography
- Location within California
- Country: United States
- State: California
- District(s): Riverside County, San Diego County
- Range coordinates: 33°27′52″N 116°18′28″W
- Topo map(s): USGS Rabbit Peak, Seventeen Palms, Fonts Point, Oasis, Clark Lake NE, Collins Valley, Toro Peak, Valerie, and Martinez Mountain

The Santa Rosa Mountains are a short mountain range in the Peninsular Ranges system, located in the south-central region of Riverside County and the far northeastern portion San Diego County of Southern California, in the Southwestern United States.

== Geography ==
The Santa Rosa Mountains extend for approximately 30 miles (48 km) along the western side of the Coachella Valley within Riverside, San Diego, and Imperial Counties in Southern California. The range connects to the San Jacinto Mountains on its northern end, where the Pines to Palms Highway—California State Route 74, crosses them.

The highest peak in the range is Toro Peak (elevation 8,716 feet (2,657 m)), located approximately 22 miles (35 km) south of Palm Springs, just south of Route 74, and on the northeast side of Anza-Borrego's Upper Coyote Canyon. The Santa Rosa Mountains are also a Great Basin Divide landform for the Salton Sink watershed on the east. Besides Toro Peak, other significant mountains in the range include Santa Rosa Mountain, Martinez Mountain in the north and Rabbit Peak in the south.

== History ==
The oldest accounts of the southeastern reaches of the Santa Rosa Mountains survive from the 1774 Spanish expedition led by explorer Juan Bautista de Anza into colonial Las Californias through the Coachella Valley from the populated Viceroyalty of New Spain region (present day Mexico). 19th century maps of the region show the Santa Rosas as a southern extension of the higher northern San Jacinto Mountains. The name "Santa Rosa Mountains" first came into use by the USGS in 1901.

== Flora and fauna ==
The Santa Rosa range lies within the Colorado Desert (lower elevations) and California montane chaparral and woodlands (higher elev.) ecoregions of flora and fauna. The California desert chaparral flora and fauna community is found here on the eastern rainshadow side. The mountain peaks contain plants such as the rock draba, Ziegler's aster, shaggy-haired alumroot and Davidson's stonecrop. Also in the eastern Santa Rosa Mountains, in canyons with natural oases, the native California fan palm (Washingtonia filifera) is found. They are also the home of a population of endangered peninsular bighorn sheep, endemic to the Peninsular Ranges and distinct from the desert bighorn sheep.

== Parks and conservation ==
Most of the northern portion of the range, in Riverside County, is within the Santa Rosa and San Jacinto Mountains National Monument. It was created in 2000 and is administered jointly by the US Bureau of Land Management (BLM) and U.S. Forest Service—San Bernardino National Forest (SBNF). The southern portion of the range, with Toro Peak, is west of the Salton Sea and within the northeastern Borrego Badlands area of the expansive Anza-Borrego Desert State Park. Both provide interpretive visitor centers, trailheads, and many trails for experiencing the Santa Rosa Mountains at all elevations. In 1990 the California Legislature created the Coachella Valley Mountains Conservancy to protect this and other mountain ranges surrounding the Coachella Valley.

== See also ==
- Juan Bautista de Anza National Historic Trail
- Mojave and Colorado Deserts Biosphere Reserve
