= List of California placenames of Native American origin =

Many places throughout the U.S. state of California take their names from the languages of the indigenous Native American/American Indian tribes. The following list includes settlements, geographic features, and political subdivisions whose names are derived from these indigenous languages.

== Listings ==
=== Counties ===
- Inyo County – named after the eponymous Mono chief.
  - Inyo Mountains
  - Inyo Volcanic Chain
  - Inyo National Forest
- Marin County – named after the eponymous Coast Miwok chief.
  - Marin City
  - Marin Creek
  - Marin Headlands
  - Marin Hills
  - Marin Islands
- Modoc County – named after the Modoc people.
  - Modoc National Forest
  - Modoc Plateau
  - Modoc Crater
- Mono County – from the Yokuts phrase monachi, meaning "those from the Sierra Nevada".
  - Mono Village
  - Mono Mills
  - Mono Lake
- Napa County – from the Patwin phrase napo, meaning "home".
  - City of Napa
  - Napa River
  - Napa Valley
- Shasta County – named after the Shasta people.
  - Region of Shasta Cascade
  - City of Shasta Lake
  - City of Mount Shasta
  - Village of Shasta
  - Village of Little Shasta
  - Mount Shasta
  - Shasta Dam
  - Shasta Lake
  - Shasta River
- Siskiyou County – disputed origin; likely from a Chinook Jargon phrase meaning "bob-tailed horse".
  - Siskiyou Mountains
  - Siskiyou National Forest
- Solano County – named after the eponymous Suisun chief.
- Sonoma County – disputed origin; likely from a Pomoan phrase meaning "valley of the moon".
  - City of Sonoma
  - Sonoma Valley
  - Sonoma Mountains
- Tehama County – from a Wintuan phrase meaning "high water".
  - City of Tehama
  - Mount Tehama
- Tuolumne County – disputed origin; likely from the phrase talmalamne of unknown origin, meaning "cluster of stone wigwams".
  - Tuolumne City
  - Tuolumne River
  - Tuolumne Grove
  - Tuolumne Meadows
  - Grand Canyon of the Tuolumne
- Yolo County – from the Patwin phrase yo-loy, meaning "a place abounding in rushes".
  - Village of Yolo

=== Settlements ===
- Acalanes Ridge
- Aguanga
- Ahwahnee
- Alleghany
- Aptos
- Azusa – from Tongva village "Azucsagna".
- Cabazon
- Cahuenga
- Calistoga
- Camanche Village
  - Camanche North Shore
- Cherokee – named after the Cherokee people.
- Cohasset
- Colma
- Concow
- Cotati
- Honcut
- Jolon
- Jurupa Valley
- Klamath River
  - Named after the Klamath River
- Laguna Niguel
- Lake Shastina
- Lompoc
- Malibu – from Ventureño "Umalibu, perhaps reflecting [(hu)maliwu], "it (the surf) makes a loud noise all the time over there".
- Merrimac
- Milpitas
- Mi-Wuk Village
- Napa
- New Chicago
- Nimshew
- Nipinnawasee
- Nipomo
- Ojai
- Pasadena - from the Ojibwe word for "valley"
- Petaluma
- Piru
- Pismo Beach – from Chumash "Pismu" for "tar".
- Point Mugu
- Port Hueneme
- Poway – from Kumeyaay language.
- Rancho Cucamonga
- Saratoga
- Saticoy
- Séc-he, Cahuilla for Palm Springs, California
- Simi Valley – from Ventureño "Simiyi".
- Sisquoc
- Sonoma
- Soquel
- Suisun City
- Tassajara Hot Springs
- Tehachapi
- Temecula – from Luiseño "Temeekunga".
- Tionesta
- Toluca Lake
- Topanga
- Tujunga
- Wyandotte
- Yucaipa
- Yeomet
- Yreka
- Zayante

=== Bodies of water ===
- Ahjumawi Lava Springs State Park – named after the Achowami people.
- Lake Cachuma
- Tahquitz Canyon and Creek, Falls, Peak, and Rock, named for Cahuilla legend Tahquitz
- Temescal Canyon, Creek, Mountains, and Valley

=== Islands ===
- Anacapa Island

=== Other ===
- Mojave Desert – named after the Mohave people.
- Yosemite National Park

== See also ==
- List of place names in the United States of Native American origin
- List of placenames of indigenous origin in the Americas
- Native Americans in the United States
