= Tahquitz =

Tahquitz may refer to:

== Culture ==
- Tahquitz (spirit), a legendary spirit of the Cahuilla and Luiseño Native American people of Southern California
- Tahquitz, a musical score by Fannie Charles Dillon
- Tahquitz, a sound installation work by Lewis deSoto

== Places ==
- Tahquitz Canyon, a canyon in Palm Springs, California
  - Tahquitz Creek, the creek that runs through Tahquitz Canyon
  - Tahquitz Falls, a waterfall within Tahquitz Canyon
- Tahquitz High School, a school in Hemet, California
- Tahquitz Peak, a peak in southern California's San Jacinto Mountains
  - Tahquitz Rock, a granite outcrop on the side of Tahquitz Peak
  - Red Tahquitz, a secondary peak, red in color, nearby Tahquitz peak
