= List of Riverside County, California, placename etymologies =

This is a list of geographic place names, or toponyms, in Riverside County, California. The county itself was named for the city of Riverside, the county seat, which in turn was named for its location beside the Santa Ana River.

== Municipalities ==
Name	Coordinates	Origin	Comments
Banning	33.926°N 116.876°W	The town was initially named Moore City, for and by Ransom B. Moore. As an early pioneer of El Monte, California, Moore had served as a Los Angeles County Supervisor in 1860. Moore established a cattle ranch in the San Gorgonio Pass in 1865, and shortly after the Southern Pacific Railroad was run through the pass in 1876, Moore laid out plans for an eponymously named town along the tracks. Within only a few months the name of the town was changed to Banning in honor of Phineas Banning, who had operated a stagecoach through the area, pastured sheep in the pass, but who is best known for being the ″Father of the Port of Los Angeles″.	The circumstances on how the town was renamed are uncertain. Welwood Murray, a friend of Banning, is often credited for renaming the town, however, there are correspondence from one of Moore's daughters that indicate Moore himself had chosen to rename the town in honor of Banning. After selling his ranch in the San Gorgonio Pass in 1883, Moore started a new ranch in the Arizona Territory, where he became a Territorial Legislator.
Beaumont	33.929°N 116.977°W	When the first stagecoach lines began service through the San Gorgonio Pass in 1862, much of the land around Beaumont had been purchased by William F. Edgar, who had participated in an earlier survey of the Pass. A stagecoach station named for him, Edgar Station, was established. When the Southern Pacific Railroad established a station and telegraph office at the Beaumont location in 1875, they named it Summit, or Summit Station. This was in recognition of the fact that Beaumont is at the summit of the San Gorgonio Pass. In 1884 George C. Egan of Banning purchased the railroad's odd numbered sections of land in the Beaumont area. He laid out a townsite that he named San Gorgonio. In 1887 the Southern California Investment Company, managed by Henry C. Sigler, purchased the town from Egan. Sigler renamed the town Beaumont, French for ″beautiful mountain″. The name was likely chosen for the town's view of the 10,834 foot (3,302 m) Mount San Jacinto.	Local lore has perpetuated the idea that Sigler named Beaumont after his hometown of Beaumont, Texas. Historian Steve Lech has suggested this cannot be accurate, as Sigler was born in Licking County, Ohio. Sigler then pursued a banking career in Osceola, Iowa, before he relocated to Los Angeles, California in the mid-1880s. Beaumont, Texas was not Sigler's hometown, and it does not appear he ever lived there.
Blythe	33.611°N 114.559°W	Blythe was named after Thomas Henry Blythe (1822–1883), a San Francisco businessman and entrepreneur, who established primary water rights to the Colorado River in the southwestern California region in 1877. Originally named Blythe City, by Thomas Blythe himself, the name was shortened to simply Blythe around the time the first post office was opened in 1908.	
Calimesa	34.003°N 117.059°W	Initially referred to as South Yucaipa, or South Bench, the South Mesa Social Club held a contest in 1927 to rename the town. Area residents, in Riverside County, wanted to distinguish themselves from their northern neighbor Yucaipa, in San Bernardino County. H. E. Church, a Redlands dentist, was awarded the $15 prize for the winning entry of Calimesa. He donated the prize to the newly formed Calimesa Chamber of Commerce. Gunther states that the name was actually coined by Martha Church, the dentist's wife. Cali, thought to mean ″hot″, was taken from the first part of California and combined with mesa, meaning tableland.	
Canyon Lake	33.674°N 117.261°W	The town is named after the reservoir it is built around. Initially the reservoir was known as Railroad Canyon Reservoir, or Railroad Canyon Lake, but now the reservoir and the community are referred to by the shortened form, Canyon Lake.	See Railroad Canyon on list of topographic place names.
Cathedral City	33.780°N 116.465°W	Cathedral City′s name is derived from Cathedral Canyon located to the south of the city in the foothills of the Santa Rosa and San Jacinto Mountains National Monument. The canyon is said to have been named for rock formations in the canyon that looked reminiscent of a cathedral. At times the city has also been referred to using the ″unappreciated″ name Cat City.	See Cathedral Canyon on list of topographic place names.
Coachella			
Corona	33.8667°N 117.5667°W	Corona is Spanish for crown or wreath. Originally called South Riverside, citizens wanted to distinguish their city from the larger city of Riverside to the north. When it came time to incorporate the city a number of different names were considered, but the name Corona was chosen to play upon a unique feature of the city, the one–mile diameter drive that circled the center of the town. The circular road also contributed to another informal name for the city, Circle City.	
Desert Hot Springs	33.961°N 116.502°W	Named for the many natural hot springs in and around the city.	
Eastvale	33.964°N 117.564°W		
Hemet	33.734°N 116.997°W	The city of Hemet received its name from the Lake Hemet Land Company. The company was formed in January, 1887, with the intent to ″buy, improve, hold, and sell land in San Diego County, California″. Between 1887 and 1893 the company advertised extensively offering land in South San Jacinto, which was still part of San Diego County until May, 1893. When the company filed a map for the South San Jacinto area in November, 1893, they named the new town Hemet. The town was incorporated January 20, 1910.	The Lake Hemet Land Company was formed at the same time as the Lake Hemet Water Company. Both companies were established by the same investors. The two companies took their name from Hemet Valley, the location where the water company would build the dam to form the Lake Hemet reservoir. See Hemet on list of topographic place names.
Indian Wells	33.719°N 116.308°W	Indian Wells was given its name because the local Desert Cahuilla Indians had established water wells in the area. The wells themselves were named Pal Kavinic, meaning water hole in the Cahuilla language, and Palma Seca, meaning dry palm in Spanish. The city was incorporated July 14, 1967.	
Indio	33.721°N 116.2156°W	Indio is Spanish for the word indian. Originally the site of the Indian Wells railroad station, the station was renamed the Indio railroad station in 1877 by the Southern Pacific Company, because another station on the same rail line was also named the Indian Wells station. In 1888 a plat map for Indio was filed for the town that had developed around the Indio railway station, and the city of Indio was incorporated on May 16, 1930.	See also Indian Wells.
Jurupa Valley	33.9845°N 117.4508°W	The Jurupa Valley toponym arose in the 19th century. It referred to an indefinite portion of the old Rancho Jurupa on the northwest side of the Santa Ana River opposite the city of Riverside. The USGS Geographic Names Information System contains no topographic feature named ″Jurupa Valley″, and until the city of Jurupa Valley was incorporated on July 1, 2011, no town or post office with that name had been established, although a subdivision of 1.25 acres (0.51 ha) farm lots was filed with the county in 1923 called Jurupa Valley Farms. None-the-less, the term is known to have been used as early as 1887 when Mariano Guadalupe Vallejo spoke at the California Fruit Growers annual convention in Riverside and described his first visit to the ″Jurupa Valley″ area in 1823, at the age of 20, while accompanying Father Gerónimo Boscana on a trip to San Jacinto. When the city first voted to incorporate in 1992, the measure failed, but the name Jurupa was chosen, if the cityhood measure had been approved. Other names considered were Rancho Jurupa, West Riverside, and Camino Real. When cityhood was again considered in 2011, and this time approved by the voters, options for the new city's name were not on the ballot. Instead ″Jurupa Valley″ was the name predetermined by the writer's of the measure.	The word Jurupa was derived from the name of a Native American village. See Jurupa on list of topographic place names.
Lake Elsinore			
Menifee			
Moreno Valley			
Murrieta			
Norco	33.9311°N 117.5486°W	Just north of the city of Corona, Norco is an abbreviation of North Corona. Rex B. Clark, the key figure in Norco's founding, is credited for coining the term.	See also Corona.
Palm Desert	33.738°N 116.370°W	Palm Desert was the name of the original subdivision south of highway 111, and Palm Village was the name of the subdivision north of the highway. In November, 1950, the two subdivisions were merged into one town named Palm Desert. The town was incorporated November 26, 1973.	
Palm Springs	33.830°N 116.545°W	The precise origin of the name Palm Springs is uncertain. The use of the word ″Springs″ is a reference to the natural hot spring in the cities downtown area, but the origin of the word palm is disputed. One possible source of palm comes from early Spanish explorers who referred to the Palm Springs area as La Palma de la Mano de Dios or The Palm of God′s hand. However, according to William Bright, when the word ″palm″ appears in Californian place names, it usually refers to the native California fan palm, Washingtonia filifera, which is abundant in the Palm Springs area. The earliest use of the name ″Palm Springs″ is from United States Topographical Engineers who used the term in 1853 maps.	See also Sec-he and Agua Caliente on list of topographic place names.
Perris			
Rancho Mirage			
Riverside	33.948°N 117.396°W	In September, 1870, the Southern California Colony Association of Jurupa was formed, and they purchased the land and water rights necessary to establish a settlement on the east side of the Santa Ana River. Initially they referred to the new town as Jurupa, the name of the 1838 Mexican land grant their land had been partitioned from. To emphasize the fact that the new town was located near a water source, in a somewhat arid region, the founders voted to officially name the new town Riverside on December 18, 1870.	See also Jurupa.
San Jacinto			
Temecula			
Wildomar			

== Topographic place names ==
Name	Coordinates	Origin	Comments
Agua Caliente	33.8235°N 116.5448°W	Meaning ″hot water″ in Spanish, the term was used to refer to the hot spring in downtown Palm Springs when the Spanish arrived in the area. The term was later used in reference to the community that developed around the spring before the town was incorporated and renamed Palm Springs.	See also Sec–he.
Annie Orton Canyon	NA	See Railroad Canyon.	
Banning Pass	See San Gorgonio	The city of Banning is located within the San Gorgonio Pass resulting in the pass sometimes being referred to as the Banning Pass.	For the origin of the name Banning, see Banning in list of Municipalities.
Bernasconi	Bay (or Cove); 33.8486°N 117.1658°W; Beach; 33.8466°N 117.1664°W; Hills; 33.8464°N 117.1544°W; Pass (and Road); 33.8408°N 117.1617°W	The Bernasconi Hills and Bernasconi Pass were named for Bernardo Bernasconi (1839–1923), a native of Switzerland, and an early pioneer of Riverside County, who purchased 284 acres of land in 1878 along the San Jacinto River, near what is now Lakeview. Bernasconi developed a sheep ranch on the land, named it Sulphur Springs Ranch, and in 1883 married Marcellini Orsi in San Francisco. After they married, Bernasconi and his wife made the ranch their home. Marcellini developed the hot springs in the area and called them Bernasconi Hot Springs. When the Lake Perris reservoir was formed in 1973, the western side of the pass was flooded, but the beach, and a small cove, at the base of the hills were named Bernasconi Beach and Bernasconi Bay.	
Blythe Intaglios	33.8003°N 114.5383°W	The Blythe Intaglios or Geoglyphs are a group of over 200 ground drawings located in the Colorado Desert. They received their name for their proximity to the city of Blythe.	See Blythe on list of municipalities.
Bradshaw Trail	Western end 33.562°N 115.589°W; Eastern end 33.493°N 114.741°W	Today's Bradshaw Trail is a remnant of the much longer Bradshaw Road, also known as the Gold Road, or Road to La Paz. When gold was discovered near La Paz, Arizona, it prompted William D. Bradshaw to map a route through the Colorado Desert between San Bernardino, California and La Paz. He primarily followed old Cahuilla Indian trading routes, and to cross the Colorado River, he and a partner set up a ferry operation. After an account of his trek was published on June 14, 1862, the road quickly became well traveled by gold seekers, stagecoach lines, and others. For a while the trail picked up the name Butterfield Road, after the Butterfiled stagecoach company, but on May 21, 1974, the Riverside County Board of supervisors officially named it the Bradshaw Trail.	
Cathedral Canyon	33.723°N 116.474°W	While performing a survey for the United States government in 1850, the canyon is said to have been named by U.S. Army Colonel Henry Washington, a nephew of President George Washington, after deciding rock formations in the canyon looked reminiscent of a cathedral. A flood in August, 1946, significantly altered the cathedral–like features of the canyon.	Jane Davies Gunther, in her book Riverside County, California Place Names; Their Origins and Their Stories, casts doubt on whether Colonel Washington actually named the canyon. None of his survey records, or the subsequent survey records by John La Croze in 1856, or by Carl R. and Marvin Caudle in 1903, mention the canyon by name. The name Cathedral Canyon first appears on the 1904 U.S. Geological Survey Indio Special Map.
Coachella Valley	Southeast end 33.406°N 116.040°W Northwest end 33.97°N 116.62°W		
Devils Garden	34.018°N 116.599°W	Devils Garden received its name because at one time it was a ″tangled mass of boulders, cactus, and desert growth″.	Devils Garden is known for its variety of cacti and succulents. The Devils Garden hiking trail winds through the area. Much of the old growth was lost due to poaching and fire.
Edgar Station	NA	See Beaumont on list of municipalities.	
Fertilla	33.6686°N 114.5966°W	Fertilla was a town about 4 miles (6.4 km) north of Blythe on the eastern side of the Ripley branch line of the California Southern Railway. The name was coined by James ″Skinny″ Walsh, who had been a Santa Fe Railroad conductor, and was meant to emphasize the fertileness of the Palo Verde Valley . The name became official when the post office in Mesaville was moved to Fertilla in March, 1914. A map of the town was filed in December, 1916. By 1955 the townsite was abandoned and overgrown.	A map for North Fertilla, on the west side of the California Southern Railway, was filed in May, 1918, but that townsite was also abandoned.
Garner Valley	Mouth; 33.6800°N 116.6783°W Source; 33.6158°N 116.6294°W	Originally known as Hemet Valley (see Hemet), then Thomas Valley (see Thomas), the name Garner Valley was adopted over time after Robert F. Garner purchased the Thomas ranch in 1905, and renamed the ranch Garner Ranch. The name was used as early as 1917 when the Automobile Club of Southern California posted signs on the main road through the valley.	
Hemet	Butte; 33.7089°N 116.9595°W Dam; 33.661°N 116.706°W; Lake; 33.666°N 116.693°W; Valley (See Garner Valley)	Hemet Butte received its name for its proximity to the town of Hemet by the U. S. Geological Survey in 1897–98. Hemet Dam and Lake Hemet received their names when they were proposed in 1887 because they were located on the southwest end of the Hemet Valley. The Valley has since been renamed Garner Valley. Historians are not certain how the valley came to be named Hemet Valley. Jane Davies Gunther identified at least five different theories on the origin of the name in her book Riverside County, California Place Names. She also identified eight alternative spellings of the name. One of the earliest known references to Hemet Valley (spelled with two ″m″s) was in the April 10, 1879, copy of the Los Angeles Herald. It stated, ″Mr. Charlie Thomas, of Hemmet Valley, San Diego County, is paying Los Angeles a visit...″. Charles H. Thomas was the earliest non–native land owner of the valley. A December 19, 1930, Hemet News article regarding the origin of the name states that Thomas's daughter, Mrs. Victoria Brooke of Hemet, believed the name Hemet was used by Native Americans prior to her father's arrival in the area. Among the Native American origin theories are; Hemet, meaning ″box″, Jemet, meaning ″acorn valley″, Hemica, meaning ″surrounded by trees″, and Hemetica, the name of an Indian maiden pursued by Tahquitz.	Other than the Native American origin theories, one repeated story is that two brothers named Joe and Pete Hemmet, of Scandinavian origins, lived in the valley prior to Thomas's arrival. No documents exist to support the story, but the Swedish word Hemmet means ″home″ or ″home-land″. See also Hemet on list of municipalities.
Herkey Creek	Creek source 33.7564°N 116.6491°W; Creek mouth 33.6692°N 116.6811°W; Park; 33.6795°N 116.6822°W	Herkey Creek, or Hurkey Creek, is located on the southern side of the San Jacinto Mountains and drains into Lake Hemet. The creek was named for Mr. Herkey who cut timber for Charles Thomas, the owner of Thomas Ranch, and the first non–Native land owner in today's Garner Valley. Sometime in the early 1880s Herkey is said to have been drinking from the creek when he was mauled by a Grizzly bear. He later died from his wounds at Thomas Ranch. A county park, Hurkey Creek Park, was later named for the Creek that runs through the park.	The Lake Hemet Water Company and Lake Hemet Land Company were formed in 1887. When they filed a notice of water rights for the creek, they spelled the name Herke Creek. They also made reference to Mt. Herke in their 1887 ads for South San Jacinto.
Jurupa	Mountains or Hills; 34.0300°N 117.4595°W Mount Jurupa (peak); 34.0322°N 117.4428°W; Oak; 34.033°N 117.391°W; Valley (See Jurupa Valley) Jurupa Mountains Discovery Center; 34.0156°N 117.4489°W	Jurupa was the name of a Native American village on the Santa Ana River prior to European colonization. The village site was occupied at times by the Serrano Indians and at other times by the Gabrieleno, who referred to the site as Jurungna or Hurungna. The 1890 book, An Illustrated History of Southern California, states that the word Jurupa was a greeting, meaning ″peace and friendship″, used by the Native Americans when the first Catholic priest visited the area. In 1902 Father Juan Caballeria, in his History of San Bernardino Valley; From the Padres to the Pioneer, states that the word was derived from Jurumpa, meaning watering place. Later linguistic studies concluded that the name likely refers to Juru, the Artemisia californica (California sagebrush), common in the area. Regardless of the origin, Spanish colonizers used the term when they established the Jurupa Rancho, one of the ranching outposts supporting the San Gabriel Mission. The Mission and Rancho were disbanded through the Mexican secularization act of 1833, but when Juan Bandini was granted the old Jurupa mission lands in 1838, along with the adjoining mission lands of Guapa, seven square leagues in all, the new rancho was named Rancho Jurupa. Some of the Rancho lands on the west side of the Santa Ana River retained the name Jurupa long after the rancho was broken up and subdivided. Jurupa was also initially used as the address by some of the early settlers on the east side of the river until they established the city of Riverside in 1870. Later, as Riverside grew in influence, some of the lands west of the river started using a Riverside or West Riverside address. In 2011 most of the old Rancho Jurupa lands west of the river, that remained unincorporated, were consolidated into the newly formed city of Jurupa Valley.	See also Jurupa Valley and Riverside on list of municipalities.
Miracle Hill	33.9479°N 116.4822°W	Miracle Hill is a small hill in Desert Hot Springs, California that tops out at 1,152 feet (351 m). It was named by Cabot Yerxa and was the location he built his home, The Eagle′s Nest, in 1913. Yerxa excavated an old Indian well on the hill and found hot mineral water. He dug a second well on the other side of the hill and found cold water. On the top of the hill he found both red and blue clay, and both sand and good soil. The combination of findings led Yerxa to name the hill Miracle Hill.	It was Yerxa's discovery of hot mineral water that led to the eventual founding and naming of Desert Hot Springs by Lawrence W. Coffee. See Desert Hot Springs on list of municipalities.
Railroad Canyon	Canyon mouth 33.674°N 117.272°W Canyon source 33.736°N 117.253°W; Dam; 33.676°N 117.273°W; Reservoir; 33.689°N 117.268°W	The canyon was initially known as San Jacinto Canyon for the San Jacinto River that flowed through the canyon. At times, it was also referred to as Cottonwood Canyon for the trees that grew in the canyon. Some mine claims in the 1880s used the name Annie Orton Canyon, but historians have not been able to determine the origin of that name. The canyon started being referred to as Railroad Canyon in 1882 when the California Southern Railroad built a line through the canyon between Perris and Elsinore. The rail line was later purchased by the Santa Fe Railroad, but eventually abandoned because of repeated flooding. After the Railroad Canyon Dam was completed in 1929, the canyon became the Railroad Canyon Reservoir, or Railroad Canyon Lake. With the demise of the railroad and canyon, the reservoir, and the community that was developed around the reservoir, both came to be known simply as Canyon Lake.	See also Canyon Lake on list of municipalities. A second location in Riverside County named Railroad Canyon is located near the town of Hemet. Geo coordinates = 33.644°N 116.892°W
San Gorgonio	Mountain; 34.0992°N 116.8249°W; Pass; 33.928°N 116.698°W; River; 33.9033°N 116.6281°W	Rancho San Gorgonio was established in 1824 by Spanish Missionaries, who named the ranch in honor of Saint Gorgonius. The ranch was one of the principal ranches, and the most distant, of the San Gabriel Mission near what is now Los Angeles, California. It occupied most of today's San Gorgonio Pass area. The name of the ranch was later applied to the pass itself, the 11,503 foot (3,506 m) peak to the north of the pass, the primary river that runs through the pass, and it was used initially as the name for the town of Beaumont.	See also Beaumont on list of municipalities.
San Jacinto Canyon	NA	See Railroad Canyon.	
Santa Ana River	33.97°N 117.50°W	Santa Ana was used by the Spanish to honor Saint Anne, the mother of the Virgin Mary. The Portolá expedition is known to have camped on the river on July 28, 1769, just two days after Saint Anne's Feast day. They used the Spanish Rio de Santa Ana to name the river, which later was translated to Santa Ana River.	
Santiago Peak			
Sec–he, Se–khi, or Sexhi	See Agua Caliente	Sec–he is the Cahuilla Indian term for ″boiling water″. It was the original name given to the Palm Springs area by the Cahuilla Indians prior to the arrival of the Spanish explorers. The name was derived from the Hot Spring located in downtown Palm Springs.	In April 2023 the Agua Caliente Band of Cahuilla Indians opened a spa, The Spa at Sec–he, which is built around the original hot spring.
Seven Palms Valley	33.9008°N 116.4778°W		
Summit Station	NA	See Beaumont on list of municipalities.	
Tahquitz	Canyon & Creek; 33.8072°N 116.5571°W; Falls; 33.8036°N 116.5617°W; Peak; 33.7552°N 116.6769°W; Rock; 33.7603°N 116.6823°W; Red Tahquitz (peak); 33.7588°N 116.6514°W	Tahquitz is the name of an ancient Cahuilla Indian shaman who had been banished to what is now Tahquitz Canyon. According to legend, the evil spirit of Tahquitz remained in the canyon after his death, and can still be seen in the form of various phenomena.	A second location in Riverside County named Tahquitz Canyon is located Santa Rosa Mountains. Geo coordinates = 33.5014°N 116.3083°W
Temescal, or Temascal	Canyon; 33.5151°N 117.3129°W; Creek; 33.5422°N 117.3650°W; Mountains; 33.7703°N 117.335°W; Valley; 33.4727°N 117.3014°W	A temescal, an alternate spelling of Temazcal, is a form of sweathouse used by some Mesoamerican Indians. The word is derived from the Aztec for ″to bathe″, tema, and ″house″, calli. Franciscan priests, who arrived in the Americas with the Spanish colonists, brought the term north to California, and applied it to the sweathouses used by California Indians. The Luiseño Indians had a settlement, with such a sweathouse, at the hot springs in Temescal Canyon. When the Spanish arrived the community became known as Temescal, and the name was later applied to Rancho Temescal when it was established around 1819 by Leandro Serrano. The name of the community and rancho were in turn applied to other geographical features in the area.	For Temescal Peak see Santiago Peak.
Thomas	Mountain (peak); 33.6214°N 116.6826°W Little ~ Mountain; 33.6289°N 116.6911°W; Mountain (Town); 33.6125°N 116.6270°W; Valley (See Garner Valley)		
Tukwet	Canyon; 33.9512°N 117.0312°W	Meaning cougar canyon in the Cahuilla language, and named in 2011 by the Morongo Band of Mission Indians, Tukwet Canyon is home to the Morongo Casino, Resort & Spa′s Morongo Golf Club. The canyon is located near the meeting point of the San Timoteo Canyon and the San Gorgonio Pass. The name was chosen because cougars roamed the area for centuries.	Before the golf club was renamed by the Morongo Band of Mission Indians it was known as the East Valley Golf Club.
Two Bunch Palms	33.9483°N 116.4883°W		
West Riverside	NA	See Jurupa.	

== See also ==
- Etymology
- Origin of the name California
- List of place names of Native American origin in California
- List of counties in California, including etymologies
- Lists of U.S. county name etymologies
  - List of U.S. county name etymologies (N–R)
- List of state and territory name etymologies of the United States
