= Thomas Mountain =

Thomas Mountain, Thomas Mountains, or Mount Thomas, may refer to:

== Thomas Mountain(s) ==
- Thomas Mountain (California), a peak in the San Jacinto Mountains, Riverside County, California
  - Little Thomas Mountain, a secondary peak in the San Jacinto Mountains, Riverside County, California
- Thomas Mountain, California, an unincorporated community in Riverside County
- Thomas Mountain Summit, a peak in Fairfield County, Connecticut
- Thomas Mountains, a mountain range in Palmer Land, Antarctica

== Mount Thomas ==
- Mount Thomas, a fictional town in Australian television drama Blue Heelers
- Mount Thomas (Alaska), a mountain in the Chugach Mountains, Alaska
- Mount Thomas (Antarctica), a mountain in the Prince Charles Mountains

== People ==
- Thomas Mountain, winner of the 1978 Charles Ives Prize
