= Jurupa Hills =

Jurupa Hills may refer to:

- Jurupa Mountains, in Southern California
- Jurupa Hills, a neighborhood in Jurupa Valley, California
  - Jurupa Hills Country Club, in the Jurupa Hills neighborhood of Jurupa Valley
- Jurupa Hills High School, in Fontana, California
- Jurupa Hills Regional Park, in Fontana, California

== See also ==
- Jurupa (disambiguation)
