= Jurupa =

Jurupa may refer to:

- Jurupa, a Native American village in Southern California: see List of Riverside County, California, placename etymologies § Jurupa
- Jurupa, a variety of common fig
- Rancho Jurupa, an 1838 Mexican land grant in Southern California
- Jurupa Valley, California, or the Jurupa Hills neighborhood within that city
  - Jurupa Valley High School

== See also ==
- Jurupa Hills (disambiguation)
- Jurupari River in Brazil
- Jurupará State Park in Brazil
