= Tahquitz Creek =

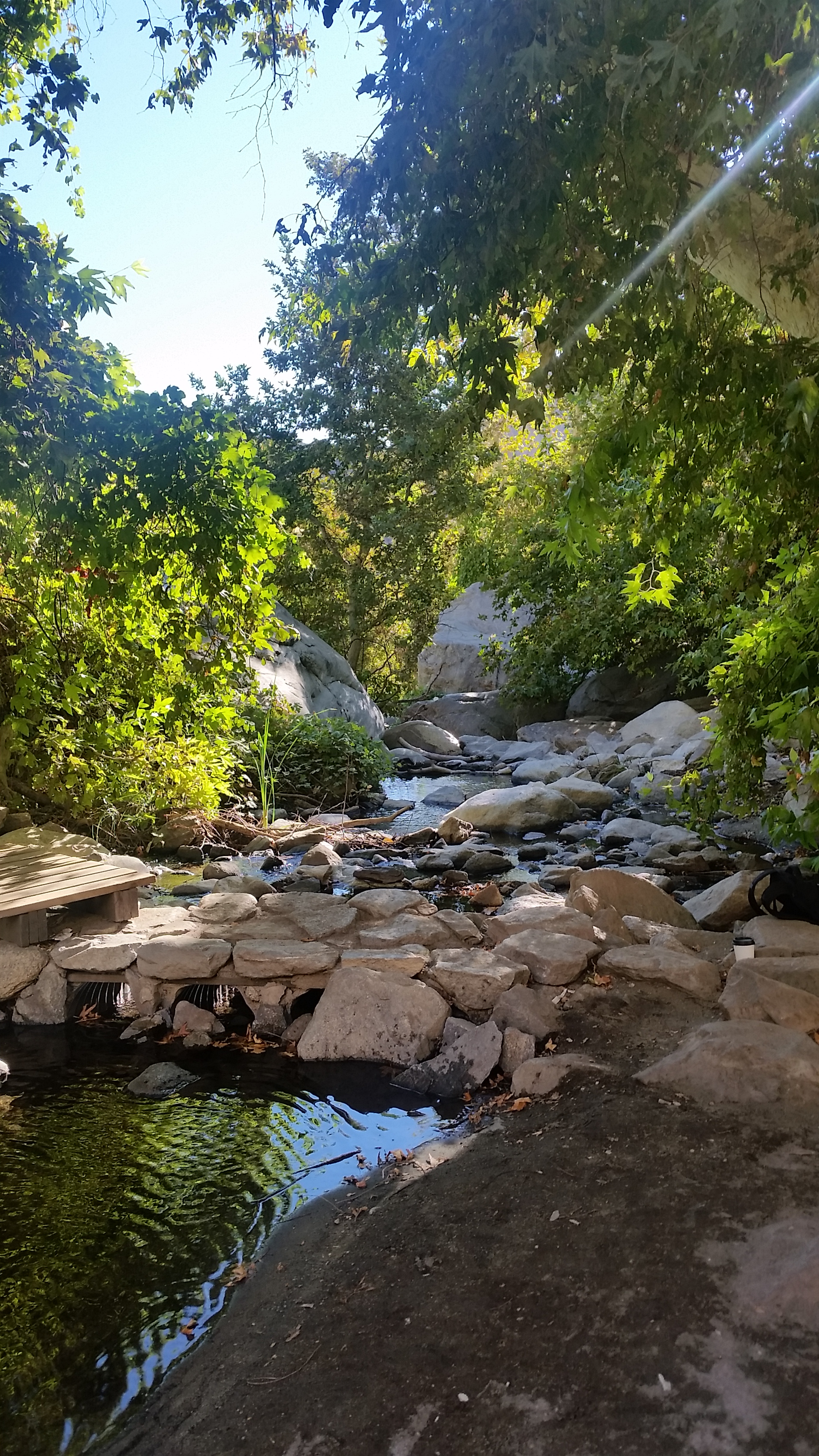
- Tahquitz creek, downstream Tahquitz Falls

Location
- Country: United States
- State: California
- Region: Palm Springs, Riverside County, California

Tahquitz Creek is a small stream in Riverside County, California. The stream originates near Saddle Junction on the east slope of Mt. San Jacinto, and works its way down the mountain towards Palm Springs, where it flows into Tahquitz Canyon. The stream forms a small waterfall at the end of the canyon, which can be accessed by a hiking trail maintained by the Agua Caliente Indian tribe as part of the reservation, on which the canyon lies. The stream is named for the mythical shaman Tahquitz, who, according to Cahuilla legend, was given powers by Mukat, the creator of all things. The creek runs down an oblongated drainage area of approximately 18 square miles ranging in elevation from over 10,500 feet (3,200 m) down to 350 feet (110 m) at Palm Springs.
