= LBAC =

LBAC may refer to:

- Late Bronze Age collapse
- Lattice-based access control
- Long Beach Area Council
