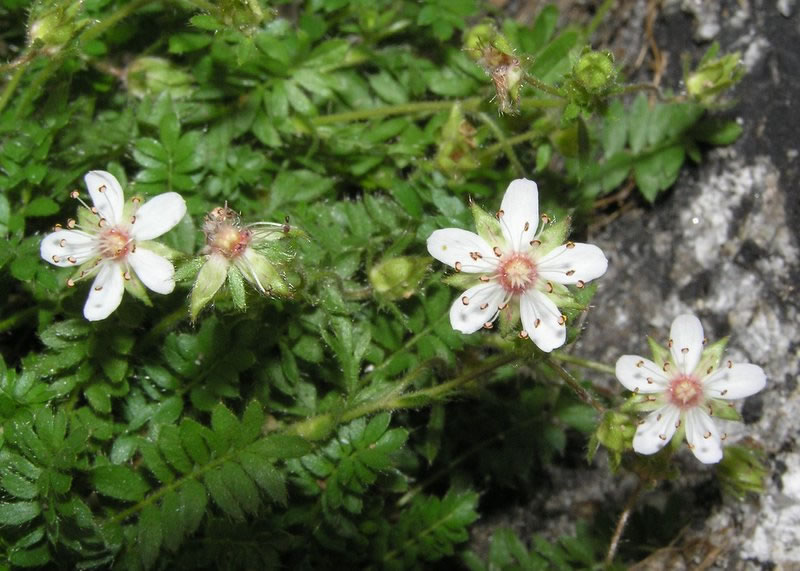

Conservation status
- Critically Imperiled (NatureServe)

Scientific classification
- Kingdom: Plantae
- Clade: Tracheophytes
- Clade: Angiosperms
- Clade: Eudicots
- Clade: Rosids
- Order: Rosales
- Family: Rosaceae
- Genus: Potentilla
- Species: P. callida

Binomial name
- Potentilla callida H.M.Hall

Synonyms
- Ivesia callida (H.M.Hall) Rydb.; Potentilla shockleyi var. callida (H.M.Hall) Jeps.

= Potentilla callida =

Species of flowering plant

Potentilla callida, commonly known as Tahquitz mousetail, is a rare species of flowering plant in the rose family.

The plant is endemic to the San Jacinto Mountains of Riverside County, California, where it is known from only two occurrences. The plant grows in cracks and crevices of granite mountain cliffs. It was named for Tahquitz Rock, a rock formation in its endemic range. The rock formation was named for the Native American spirit Tahquitz.

== Description ==
Potentilla callida is a small perennial herb which forms matted patches of hanging foliage on cliff faces. The leaves are strips of oval-shaped green leaflets. Each leaf is up to 7 centimeters long and has several pairs of hairy, glandular leaflets. The thin, green, hanging stems grow up to 15 centimeters long and bear an inflorescence of several flowers. Each flower has five hairy, pointed sepals and five round to oval white petals. The center of the flower contains twenty stamens with disc-shaped anthers and several pistils.
