= Tribe of Tahquitz =

Boy Scout honor society

Tahquitz Community
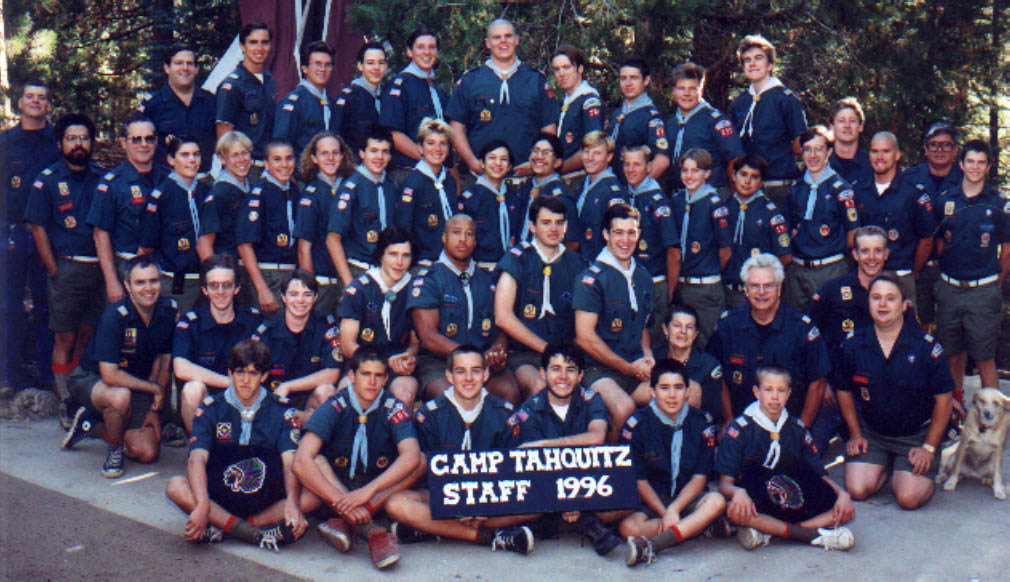
- Camp Tahquitz staff 1996
- Age range: 14-21 years old
- Location: Long Beach, CA & Barton Flats, CA
- Country: United States
- Founded: 20 December 1925; 100 years ago
- Archon: Benjamin Viveros (2025-26)
- Minor Archon: Benjamin Farrelly (2025-26)
- Envoy: Evan Ready (2025-26)
- Mountaineer: Aidan Baer (2025-26)
- Keeper: Andrew VanderBeek (2025-26)
- Affiliation: Long Beach Area Council
- Website www.tahquitz.org
- Staff Dress Uniform

The Tahquitz Community is one of a few local Scouting America honor societies in the United States that have not been absorbed by the Order of the Arrow. The organization was created on 20 December 1925 and consisted of 15 honor Scouts who were chosen to start and maintain a perpetual volunteer summer camp staff at Camp Tahquitz. At this first meeting Randolph Richards was elected as the first Big Chief, which was the name of the Archon position at that time. The history of the Tribe/Community is intertwined with that of the two camps that they have inhabited making one inseparable from the other.

To keep active during the winter months, the organization has developed an extensive Indian Lore, backpacking and service program. These programs benefit the Long Beach Area Council and surrounding community and give the members unique youth leadership experience. This Indian Lore program was retired during the 2020 season. The "Tribe of Tahquitz" was also renamed to the "Tahquitz Community" in an attempt to change direction by community leadership. In place of the Indian Lore program has been installed a mountaineer program focusing on early 19th century fur trapping, though this program has been slow to get off the ground it does have general support.

The organization is particularly known for the Indian lore ceremonies that its members perform throughout the year at Scouting and civic group meetings. A great sense of dedication and many traditions has been developed throughout the near 100 year history of the organization. The Tahquitz Community exists only in the Long Beach Area Council, but has many "out of council" members, from California to New York, and beyond.

The Long Beach Area Council did not have an Order of the Arrow lodge for many years, but used only the camping honor society, The Tahquitz Community. On 19 May 2012, the Long Beach Area Council started an Order of the Arrow lodge. A number of councils have both OA and local camping honor societies.

== Officers ==
The Tahquitz Community is run by five elected officers with each serving a one-year term. The officers are elected each year at the annual meeting held right after induction, usually taking place in the Bowl on the Monday of Labor Day weekend

Archon: The Archon is the chief executive officer, and is responsible for overseeing and coordinating all the Community's activities. They are the organization's spokesperson and main connection to the Scout units in the Long Beach Area Council and the community. In addition, the Archon is also responsible for working closely with the camp director to ensure a successful summer camp season.

Minor Archon: The Minor Archon assists the Archon, and assumes the responsibilities of the Archon in their absence. They are the editor-in-chief of The Runner and also oversee the Community's Neophyte program. The Runner is the organization's newsletter, which is published regularly and is filled with articles by the members, news about upcoming events, and other features of interests. The Neophyte Program is made up of honor scouts who are 13 but have not yet turned 14 (being ineligible for membership). The Minor Archon is responsible to host events "down the hill" (in Long Beach) to drum up interest amongst the Neophytes in the hope that they will come back and spend a week on staff as staff in training (SIT).

Envoy: The Envoy is primarily responsible for the Rendezvous (Trapping) program of the Community. They also coordinate the Community's workshops and induction.

Mountaineer: The Community also promotes camping and outdoor activities. The Mountaineer's duties include promoting Camp Tahquitz to Scouts whose troops have signed up to go to summer camp. They also assist the Archon and the council with camporees, backpacking trips, rock climbing, the Venturing program and other activities.

Keeper: The Keeper is the financial officer of the Community and works with the business manager to maintain the Community's accounts, records, and supplies. They also assist the other officers in the preparation of an annual budget and is responsible for all saleable supplies.

== Membership requirements ==
To be eligible for membership, a Scout must:

- Be at least 14 years of age or have completed the 8th grade by 31 December of the year in which they apply;
- Be at least a First Class Scout with two (2) of either Camping, Cooking, Hiking, Backpacking, or Wilderness Survival Merit Badges
- Have participated in at least two five (5) consecutive-day long-term camping experiences, at the discretion of the officers. At least one of these five (5) consecutive-day long-term camping experiences must be spent at Camp Tahquitz.
- At the time of their induction, be registered with the Boy Scouts of America.

== Membership invitation ==
Near the end of the week of summer camp that a troop attends, the youth camp staff, along with scoutmasters present in camp, meets at the Rock. There they discuss all of the Scouts present in camp who are truly “Honor Scouts.” Then, after a democratic vote by any and all youth members present (mostly that year's current youth camp staff), those Scouts who are deemed worthy are offered an invitation to join. The Community announces and invites its new members at the Friday night awards campfire.

In order to become regular members, they must complete the annual induction ceremony held at Camp Tahquitz over Labor Day weekend. All regular members have the right to hold office and vote on Community business. At the annual meeting following their 21st birthday, youth Members become "Honorary" members. They provide valuable service to the Community as advisers, but can no longer vote or hold office.

== Name Change ==
At the first meeting of the Honor Scouting Organization in Idyllwild, CA the name Tribe of Tahquitz adopted. For 95 years Tribe, as the name is commonly shortened to, focused on providing a program focused on American Indian dancing, singing, and regalia. The first uses of this program in the 1940s and 50s was a very crude representation of American Indian dancing, but by the 1990s the organization had refined the program to accurately reflect and respect the culture being represented Some members would even travel as far as Ponca City, OK to compete in the annual Ponca Powwow. The dancers sent from the Tribe of Tahquitz were often praised for their skill and won multiple competitions over the years

As social norms changed around the end of the 2010s it became clear that some parts of the program did not demonstrate the amount of respect that should be given to other cultures. After a deep analysis of the American Indian Lore program it became apparent that some of the elements included cultural appropriation and stereotyping, which were deemed unacceptable. At the 96th Annual Meeting, which was help virtually on 19 December 2020 due to the Covid-19 Pandemic, the organizations constitution was amended to change to remove American Indian stereotyping and aim to refocus the image of the organization to the broader community. Also among the changes were the removal of male specific terms, which were replaced by gender neutral terms to accommodate the inclusion of women in the program beginning in 2019.

Officer Name Change
Old Officer Title	New Officer Title
Chief	Archon
Little Chief	Minor Archon
Medicine Man	Envoy
Mountain Man	Mountaineer
Keeper of the Tally	Keeper

== Notable Members ==
- David Foral (Mountain Man), member of the Dirty Heads
- Brent Bennitt, Commanding Officer of the USS Nimitz

== See also ==
- Scouting America
- Order of the Arrow
- Tribe of Mic-O-Say
- Firecrafter
- Tahquitz (spirit)
- Scouting in California
