= Declezville, California =

Unincorporated community in California, United States

South Fontana
- unincorporated community
- Nicknames: The Ridge, Southridge
- Location within the state of California South Fontana (the United States)
- Coordinates: 34°2′40″N 117°28′53″W
- Country: United States
- State: California
- County: San Bernardino
- Elevation: 938 ft (286 m)

Population (2000)
  - Total: 57,832
- Time zone: UTC-8 (PST)
  - Summer (DST): UTC-7 (PDT)
- ZIP codes: 92337
- GNIS feature ID: 1656478

Declezville is a formerly unincorporated community in southwestern San Bernardino County, in the Inland Empire region of southern California. Today, it is located within the city limits of Fontana.

The community is named for William Declez, a naturalized U.S. citizen, born in France, well known for his marble business on Los Angeles Street. Declez opened granite quarries in Southern California in the 1860s in the Jurupa Hills on Pyrite Street, and built several Mexican public buildings. He died at age 73 on February 7, 1921, in the Southern Alps. When the Southern Pacific Railroad built a spur to the large granite quarries, it named the junction Declez and the terminal Declezville, after the granite works owner. Declez is now a community within south Fontana.

== Geography ==
The community is located in the northwestern foothills of the Jurupa Mountains, and at the southeastern edge of the Pomona Valley.

It is located in the southwestern portion of the city of Fontana.

Declezville is at an average elevation of 938 feet (286 m).
