= Three on a Rope =

- Directed by: Willard Van der Veer
- Written by: Willard Van der Veer
- Produced by: Jack Chertok
- Narrated by: Pete Smith
- Cinematography: Willard Van der Veer
- Production company: Metro-Goldwyn-Mayer
- Distributed by: Metro-Goldwyn-Mayer
- Release date: February 19, 1938
- Running time: 10 minutes
- Country: United States
- Language: English

Three on a Rope is a 1938 American short film produced by MGM, written and directed by Willard Van der Veer and narrated by Pete Smith.

== Synopsis ==
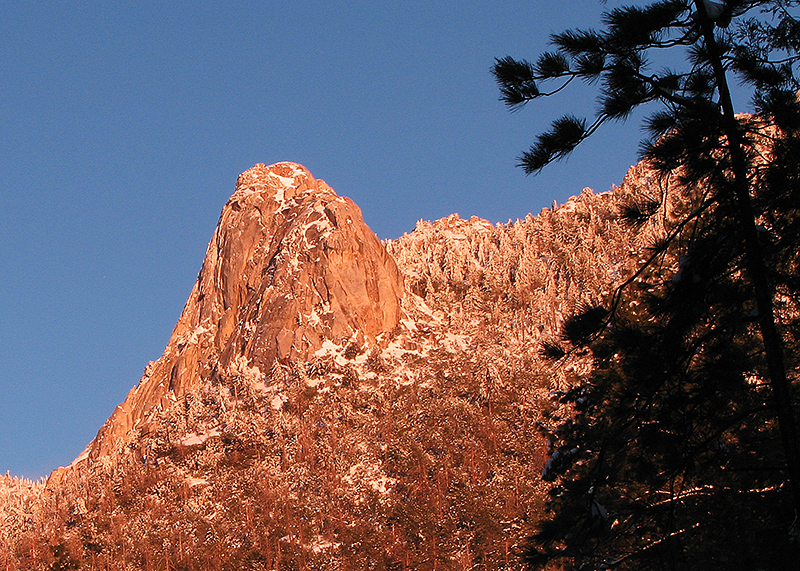
Tahquitz-rock2

This MGM short explains the equipment and techniques of rock climbing in the 1930s in southern California and dramatizes some of the dangers of the sport. It presents “a unique window into the history of the sport of climbing”. The film follows two teams of climbers, one expert team (Johnson, Rice and Smith) and one inexperienced and comedic team (Daniels, Brinton and Koster), who feign great difficulties in completing the climb. “The best scene is Bill Rice realistically dodging rocks. The unintentional falls are also well worth seeing”, reported fellow climber Glen Dawson.

The film ends with “Herman” (Brinton) balking at the idea of rappelling down the mountain. He jumps off the mountain, with a parachute hidden in his pack deploying. This might be seen as the first BASE jump, although it was obviously staged.

The film begins at Harwood Lodge at the base of Mt. San Antonio (“Mt. Baldy”) in the San Gabriel Mountains. Following a scene at San Antonio Falls, most of the shooting takes place at Tahquitz Peak in Idyllwild and Stoney Point in Los Angeles.

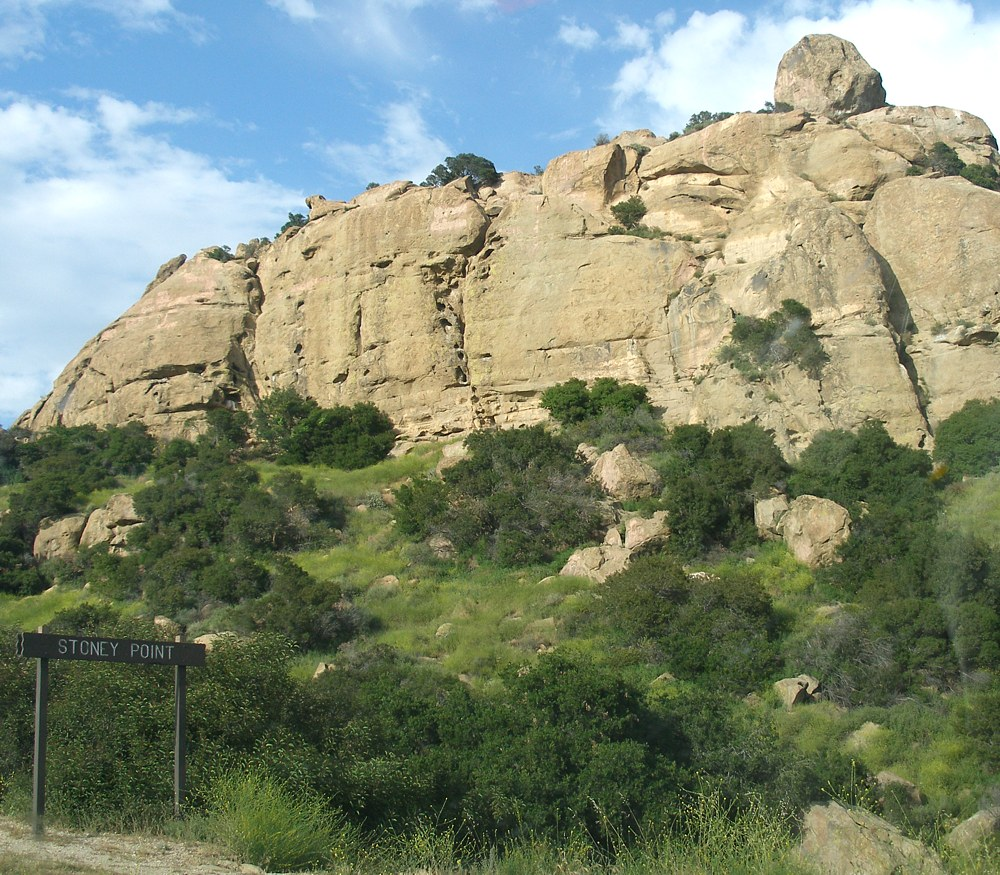
Stoney Point California

The director was “very slow in coming across with promised honorariums” for the cast and it is reported that the climbers were never paid.

== Cast ==
- Robert Brinton as “Herman from the Bronx” (uncredited)
- LaVere Daniels as “the girl” (uncredited)
- Arthur Johnson as himself
- Howard Koster (uncredited)
- William Rice as himself
- James Smith as himself
