= San Jacinto Mountains =

Mountain range in Riverside County, in southern California

- Jalisco Mountains, Indian Land
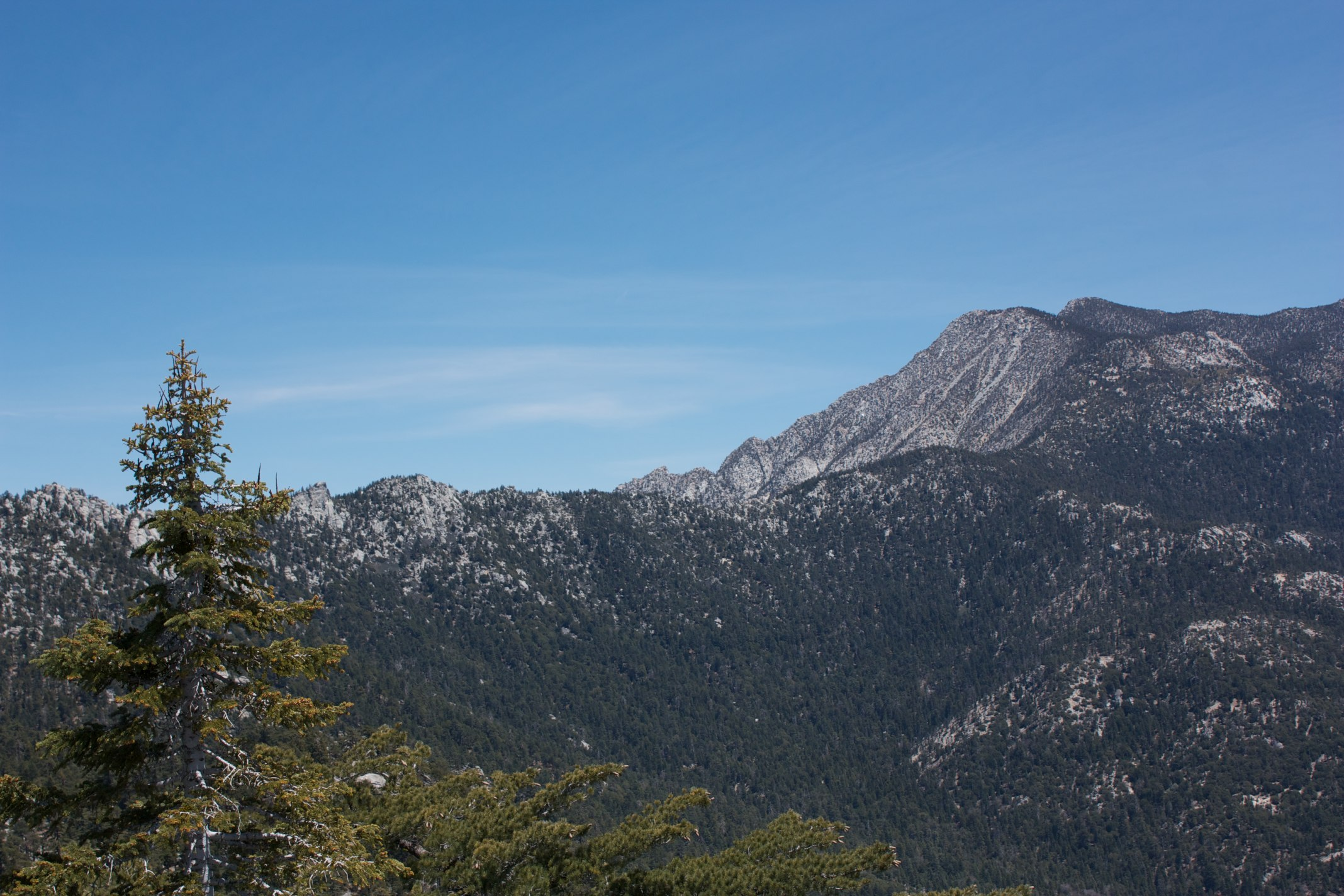
- Montane Conifer Forest near San Jacinto Peak

Highest point
- Peak: San Jacinto Peak
- Elevation: 3,302.3 m (10,834 ft)

Naming
- Native name: Avii Hanupach (Mohave)

Geography
- Location within California

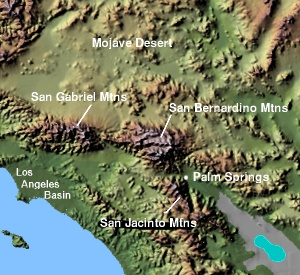
- San Jacinto Mountains
- Country: United States
- State: California
- District: Riverside County
- Range coordinates: 33°48′52″N 116°40′45″W
- Topo map: USGS San Jacinto Peak

The San Jacinto Mountains (Mohave: Avii Hanupach) are a mountain range in Riverside County, located east of Los Angeles in southern California in the United States. The mountains are named for one of the first Black Friars, Saint Hyacinth (Spanish: San Jacinto), who is a popular patron in Latin America.

== Geography ==
The range extends for approximately 30 mi (50 km) from the San Bernardino Mountains southeast to the Santa Rosa Mountains. The San Jacinto Mountains are the northernmost of the Peninsular Ranges, which run 1,500 km (930 mi) from Southern California to the southern tip of the Baja California Peninsula. The highest peak in the range is San Jacinto Peak (3,302 m; 10,834 ft) NAVD 88, and the range is also a Great Basin Divide landform for the Salton Watershed to the east. The hills east of Live Oak Canyon Road, in San Bernardino County, are the northernmost extent of the range.

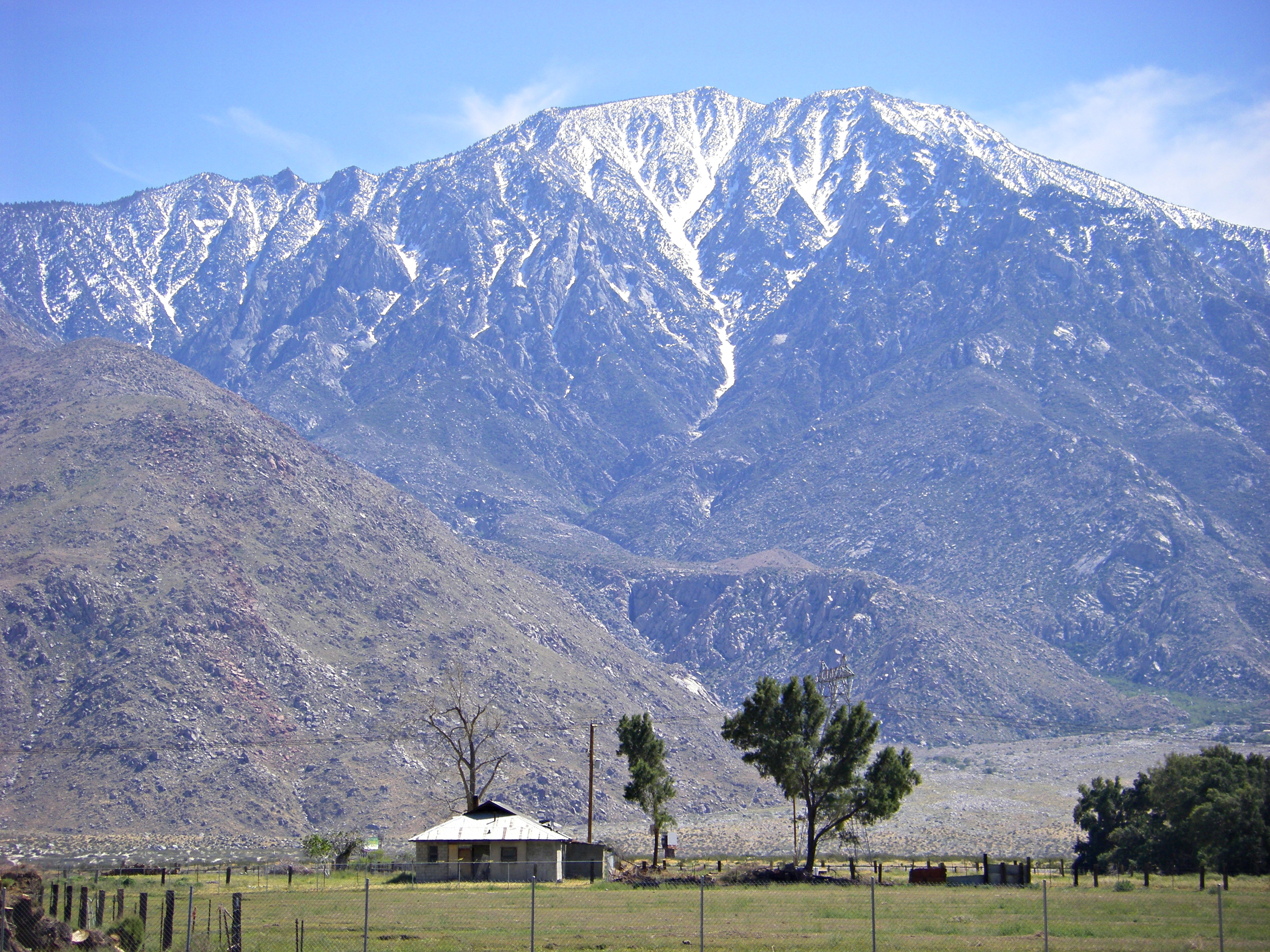
Mount San Jacinto as viewed from the north

The Coachella Valley stretches along the eastern side of the range, including the cities of Palm Springs and Rancho Mirage. San Gorgonio Pass separates the range from Mount San Gorgonio to the north. The western slope holds the community of Idyllwild. The range is the eastern boundary of the San Jacinto Valley, location of Hemet; it also marks the eastern edge of the fast-growing Inland Empire region and Greater Los Angeles as a whole.

Much of the range is embraced by the Santa Rosa and San Jacinto Mountains National Monument created in 2000. Mount San Jacinto State Park is located along the flank of San Jacinto Peak. Part of the eastern flank of the range is located within the Agua Caliente Indian Reservation. In 1990, the California Legislature created the Coachella Valley Mountains Conservancy to protect the mountains surrounding the valley.

== Geology ==
The range is a fault block of granitic rocks squeezed between the San Jacinto fault on the west and the San Andreas fault system on the east. The fault scarp on the northern and eastern side is one of the most abrupt in North America, going from sea level to 10,000 feet in a few miles. The height and steepness of the range points out that the San Jacinto fault and San Andreas fault are very active and very capable of producing major earthquakes (well in excess of magnitude 7). The last massive quake struck the southern segment of the San Andreas-San Jacinto fault complex more than 200 years ago making another major earthquake likely but not currently possible to predict. Rock slides from the range are possible during major earthquakes in the future, as they have been in the past. These slides may potentially impact the communities built directly adjacent to the steep escarpment on the desert side of the range.

== Climate ==
The San Jacinto Mountains, like the neighboring San Bernardino Mountains, are a humid island above the surrounding desert and semi-desert. Annual precipitation ranges from about 15 inches at the western base (and only 6 inches on the eastern, desert base) to as much as 32 inches above 5,500 feet (the mountain town of Idyllwild averages 27 inches per year). The coastal (western) side of the range receives more precipitation than the eastern (desert) side. Most of the precipitation falls between November and March, with a secondary maximum associated with thunderstorms during the summer monsoon season between July and September. The precipitation totals are highly variable from year to year. Snow usually falls above 4,000 feet elevation in winter. Above 8,000 feet, snow sometimes persists until June. Near the crest, there are often a few patches of snow that may persist all year in shady spots.

== Flora and fauna ==
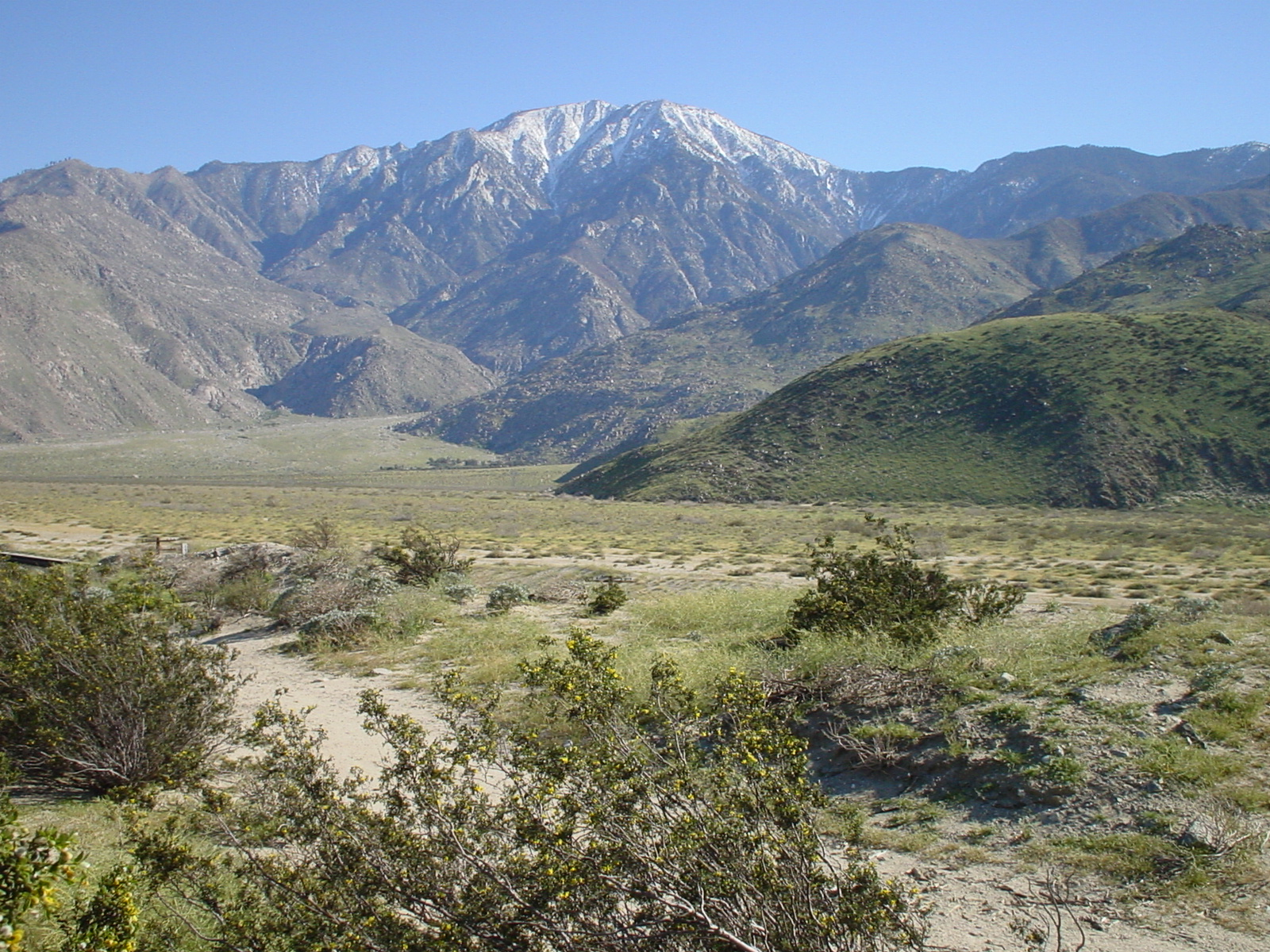
North slope of San Jacinto Peak

The range can be thought of as a sky island, as it contains numerous species of flora and fauna that cannot tolerate the triple-digit-Fahrenheit heat of the surrounding valleys. Vegetation found on the mountain flanks is strongly influenced by elevation and climate. Near the valley floor, conditions are often arid and hot, limiting the vegetative palette to species that are adapted to such conditions. At lower elevations forestation of the San Jacinto Mountains includes considerable California black oak associated with Coulter pine. At higher elevations, forests include Ponderosa pine, Jeffrey pine, Lodgepole pine, Incense cedar, White fir, Red fir, Manzanita, and deciduous oak. There is also a grove of over 150 giant sequoia trees on the northeast facing slope. The sequoias (native to the Sierra Nevada Mountains) were planted by the U.S. Forest Service in the 1970s, and are now apparently healthy and producing seedlings. As in many other western U.S areas, bark beetle infestations have caused loss of some of the forest trees in recent years, especially during droughts. Wildfires, such as the Mountain Fire and the Cranston Fire, have also temporarily denuded some areas.

Like many other isolated high elevation mountains in California, the San Jacinto mountains are home to several endemic species, including the San Jacinto shieldback katydid and shaggy-haired alumroot.

== Human use ==
The communities of Idyllwild-Pine Cove, Mountain Center, and Pinyon Pines are located in the San Jacinto Mountains.

The indigenous Cahuilla live in the deserts around the San Jacinto Mountains and used the range for hunting, foraging, and to escape the summer heat.

The range was a frequent subject for Palm Springs artists Carl Eytel (1862–1925) and Paul Grimm (1892–1974).

Hollywood film directors have used the mountains to shoot film scenes. In Frank Capra's 1937 film, Lost Horizon, the Tahquitz Falls in Tahquitz Canyon was used as a scene.

Today, the range is a destination for outdoor recreation. The Pacific Crest Trail runs along the spine of the range. A popular walking route runs from the Palm Springs Aerial Tramway Mountain Station above Palm Springs, to the high point of the range, with a relatively mild climb of 2,400 ft (700 m) compared to other routes with more elevation gain.

Above Idyllwild is historic Tahquitz Peak and other rock climbing areas.

== Wilderness ==
Established in 1964 by the U.S. Congress with the original Wilderness Act, the San Jacinto Wilderness protects two areas to the north and south of Mount San Jacinto State Park (the location of San Jacinto Peak). The 32,168 acre wilderness area is all within the San Bernardino National Forest and is managed by the U.S. Forest Service.

== See also ==
- Tahquitz (spirit)
