= Mount Jurupa =

Mountain in California, United States

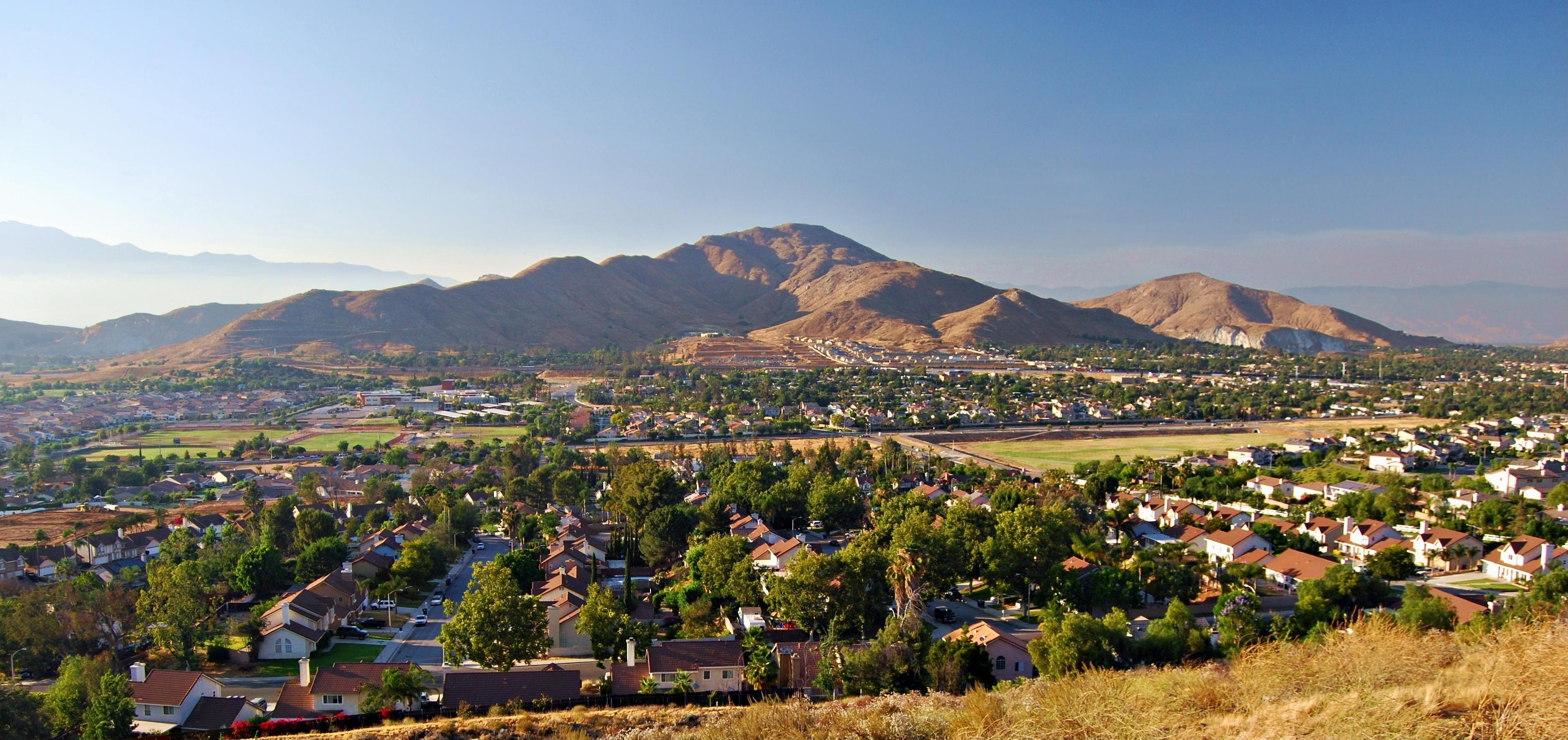
- A view of Mount Jurupa from a nearby hillside

Highest point
- Elevation: 2,224 ft (678 m) NAVD 88
- Prominence: 1,167 ft (356 m)
- Coordinates: 34°01′56″N 117°26′34″W

Geography
- Location within California
- Location: Riverside County, California, U.S.
- Parent range: Jurupa Mountains
- Topo map: USGS Fontana

Climbing
- Easiest route: Hike

Mount Jurupa is the highest point of the Jurupa Mountains, located in northwestern Riverside County, California. The summit is just south of the Riverside – San Bernardino county line. A hiking trail leads to its summit, which offers panoramic views of Riverside, Fontana, San Bernardino, and Moreno Valley.

In a small canyon at the base of the mountain is the Jurupa Mountains Discovery Center, a non-profit educational facility that includes nature trails, gardens, and an Earth Science Museum.

The name can be traced to the Jurupa land grant dated September 28, 1838. Before the secularization of the missions, Jurupa was the name of one of the Mission San Gabriel ranchos. Jarupa was probably a Serrano or Gabrielino Shoshonean name.

== See also ==
- List of Riverside County, California, placename etymologies#Jurupa
