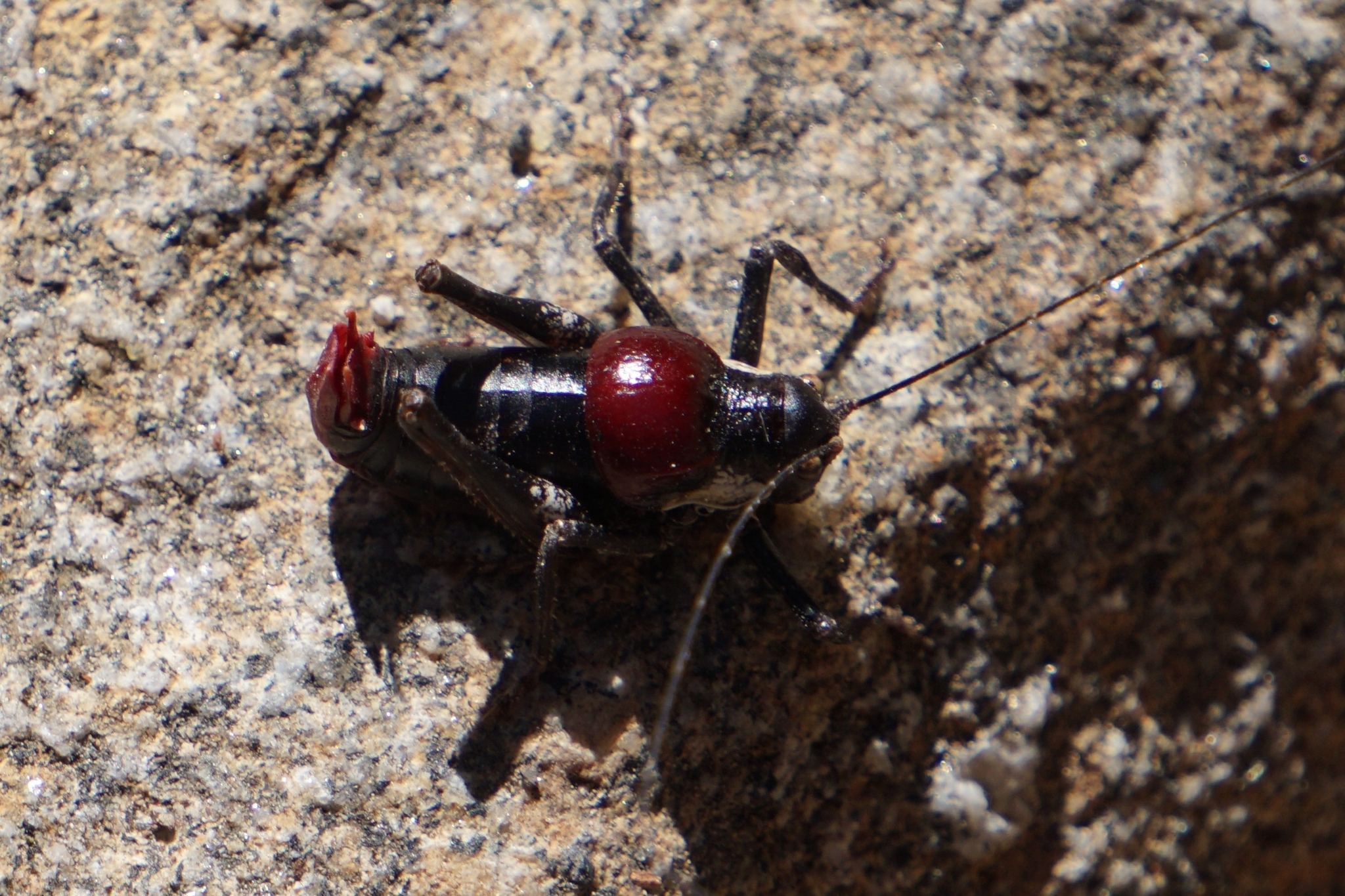
- A male Phymonotus jacintotopos near Wellman Divide in the San Jacinto Mountains

Scientific classification
- Domain: Eukaryota
- Kingdom: Animalia
- Phylum: Arthropoda
- Class: Insecta
- Order: Orthoptera
- Suborder: Ensifera
- Family: Tettigoniidae
- Subfamily: Tettigoniinae
- Tribe: Nedubini
- Genus: Phymonotus; Lightfoot, Weissman & Ueshima, 2011
- Species: P. jacintotopos

Binomial name
- Phymonotus jacintotopos Lightfoot, Weissman & Ueshima, 2011

= Phymonotus =

San Jacinto shieldback

Rare species of shieldback katydid

Phymonotus jacintotopos, or San Jacinto shieldback, is a rare species of shieldback katydid endemic to the San Jacinto Mountains of southern California. It has a distinct red-and-black coloration not found in similar katydids.

== Distribution and habitat ==
Phymonotus jacintotopos is endemic to the San Jacinto Mountains of southern California, the highest section of the Baja California Peninsular Ranges extending to the south. It inhabits high elevation mixed conifer forests consisting mainly of Jeffrey pine, Ponderosa pine, White fir, and California incense cedar, occurring above 1,500 metres (4,900 ft) elevation up to at least 3,000 metres (9,800 ft). It is reported as especially common near the community of Fern Valley on the western slopes of the mountain range.
