= Pedley Hills =

Mountain range in California, US

- Location within California Location within the United States

Highest point
- Elevation: 1,030 ft (310 m)

Geography
- Country: United States
- State: California
- Region: Peninsular Ranges
- District: Riverside County
- Range coordinates: 33°59′42″N 117°27′07″W
- Topo map: USGS Riverside West

The Pedley Hills are a low mountain range of the northern Peninsular Ranges System, in northwestern Riverside County, California. They are named for William Pedley, a civil engineer, who emigrated to the United States from England.

== Geography ==
The hills are located within the city of Jurupa Valley, to the north and west of, and across the Santa Ana River from, the city of Riverside. The community of Rubidoux, a neighborhood of Jurupa Valley, is on the eastern side of the Pedley Hills, the neighborhood of Mira Loma is on the west and the neighborhood of Pedley is to the northwest.

The taller Jurupa Mountains are nearby to the north.

The hills are the location of the Indian Hills Golf Club.

== See also ==
- Jurupa Mountains
- Mount Rubidoux
- Mountain ranges of Riverside County, California
