= Jurupa Mountains =

Small mountain range in Southern California

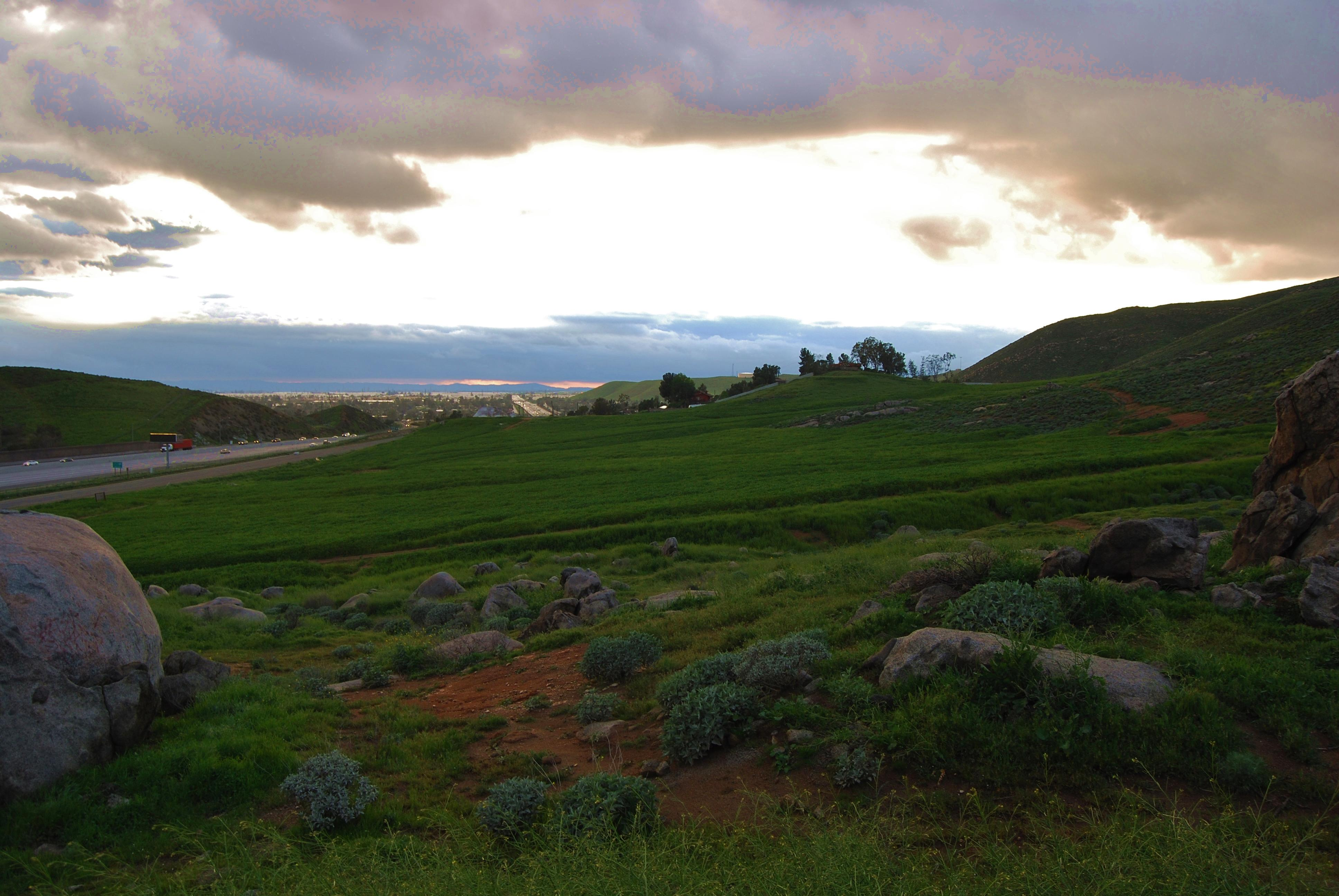
- Scenery in the Jurupa Mountains adjacent to the 60 Freeway, looking west

Highest point
- Peak: Mount Jurupa
- Elevation: 2,217 ft (676 m)

Geography
- Location within California
- Country: United States
- State: California
- Region: Peninsular Ranges
- District: Riverside County
- Range coordinates: 34°1′48.047″N 117°27′34.174″W
- Topo map: USGS Fontana
- Biome: California chaparral and woodlands

Geology
- Rock type: Cretaceous

The Jurupa Mountains, or Jurupa Hills, are a small mountain range of the Peninsular Ranges System, located in the southeastern Pomona Valley, within northwestern Riverside County and southwestern San Bernardino County of the Inland Empire region, southern California.

== Geography ==
Mount Jurupa, at 2,217 feet (676 m), is the tallest point in the range. It and the range draw their name from the Rancho Jurupa, an 1838 Mexican land grant, and one of the earliest permanent settlements in the area.

The southern slopes of the range descend into the city of Jurupa Valley and the Pomona Freeway (State Route 60) in Riverside County. The northern slopes descend into the city of Fontana and the community of Declezville in San Bernardino County.

The Pedley Hills are nearby on the eastern side of the Jurupa Mountains, and the Pomona Valley wraps around their northern and western sides.

=== Points of interest ===
- Stringfellow Acid Pits, a major toxic waste and EPA Superfund site, located in Pyrite Canyon on the southern face of the hills.
- Jurupa Mountains Discovery Center is a local nature preserve, and home of the Ruth and Sam Kirkby Earth Science Museum and the Granite Hill Nursery, located at the just off the Pomona Freeway.
- Martin Tudor Jurupa Hills Regional Park, of the city of Fontana, is on their north slope.
- Southridge Village Open Space Reserve RecreationParks.net: Southridge Village Open Space Reserve, in Fontana.
- Quarry Hill Golf Club, on their eastern slope.

== See also ==
- List of Riverside County, California, placename etymologies#Jurupa
