= Wyandotte, California =

Unincorporated community in California, United States

Wyandotte
- Unincorporated community
- Location in California Wyandotte (the United States)
- Coordinates: 39°27′29″N 121°28′04″W
- Country: United States
- State: California
- County: Butte
- Elevation: 669 ft (204 m)

Wyandotte is an unincorporated community in Butte County, California, United States. It is located 6 miles (9.7 km) northwest of Bangor, at an elevation of 669 feet (204 m).

A post office operated at Wyandotte from 1859 (having been transferred from Tarr's Ranch) to 1867, then from 1880 to 1915. The place is named for a group of Wyandotte people who went there prospecting for gold in 1850. Wyandotte was the site of one of the first schoolhouses in Butte County, built in 1857.
