= Tahquitz High School =

Public school in California, United States

Location
- 4425 Titan Trail; Hemet, California 92545; United States; 33°46′05″N 117°01′08″W

Information
- Type: Public High School
- Principal: Andrew Holmes
- Teaching staff: 80.19 (FTE)
- Enrollment: 1,801 (2023-2024)
- Student to teacher ratio: 22.46
- Colors: Green and gold
- Nickname: Titans
- Website: www.tahquitzhs.org

Established in August 2007, Tahquitz High School (Tah-quitz) is a high school of approximately 1700 students on the northwestern side of Hemet, California operated by the Hemet Unified School District. The high school's mascot is a 'titan warrior' school colors are green and gold.

Kari McGowan was the school principal at the start of the 2023-2024 school year.

The high school served as an evacuation center during the Fairview Fire of September 2022.

== Demographics ==
The demographic breakdown of the 1,582 students enrolled for the 2014–2015 school year was:

- Male - 54.2%
- Female - 45.8%
- Native American/Alaskan - 0.4%
- Asian/Pacific islanders - 3.5%
- Black - 11.3%
- Hispanic - 60.5%
- White - 20.9%
- Multiracial - 3.3%

In addition, 80.5% of the students were eligible for free or reduced-priced lunch, making this a Title I school.

== Sports and athletics ==
- Soccer-m/f
- Football-m
- Basketball-m/f
- Baseball-m
- Golf-m/f
- Tennis-m/f
- Track and field-m/f
- Water polo-m/f
- Wrestling-m/f
- Volleyball-m/f
- Softball-f

Female participation sports designated with an "f"; male participation sports designated with a "m".

== See also ==
- Tahquitz (spirit)
