= Nimshew, California =

Unincorporated community in California, United States

Nimshew
- Unincorporated community
- Location in California Nimshew (the United States)
- Coordinates: 39°50′37″N 121°37′09″W
- Country: United States
- State: California
- County: Butte
- Elevation: 2,507 ft (764 m)

Nimshew is a former mining town in Butte County, California, United States, formed to house workers at the nearby Nimshew gold mine. It lies at an elevation of 2507 feet (764 m). Nimshew had a post office from 1880 to 1923. It is now a neighborhood of Magalia.
