= Mount Thomas (Alaska) =

Mountain in Alaska, United States

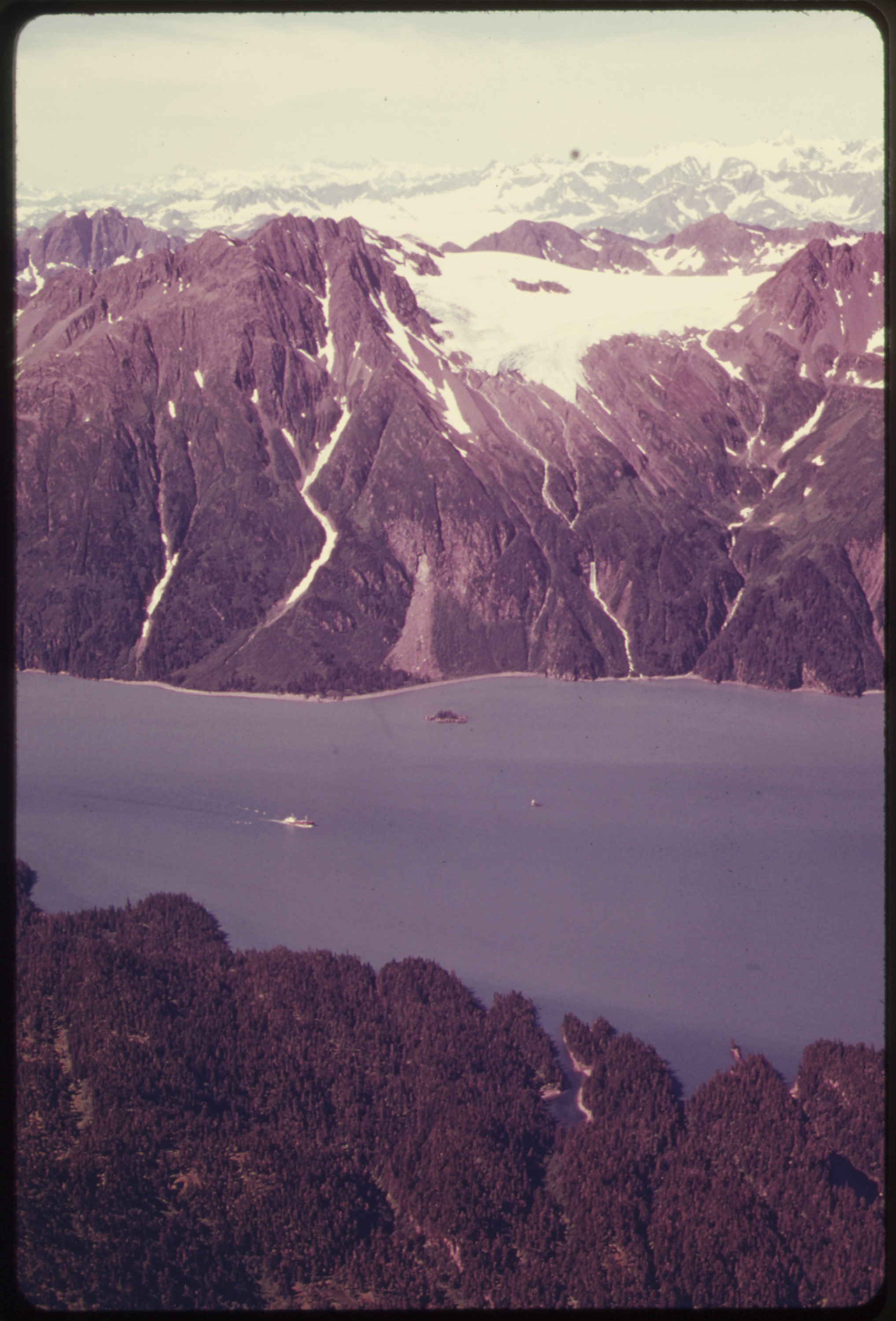
- Aerial of Mt. Thomas across Valdez Narrows

Highest point
- Elevation: 4,350 ft (1,326 m)
- Prominence: 1,000 ft (305 m)
- Isolation: 2.06 mi (3.32 km)
- Coordinates: 61°04′57″N 146°43′04″W

Geography
- Location within Alaska
- Location: Chugach Census Area; Alaska, United States
- Parent range: Chugach Mountains
- Topo map: USGS Valdez A-8

Mount Thomas is a 4,350-foot (1,326 m) mountain summit located in the Chugach Mountains, in the U.S. state of Alaska. The peak is situated 15 mi (24 km) west-southwest of Valdez, Alaska, on the boundary of Chugach National Forest. Although modest in elevation, relief is significant since the eastern aspect of the mountain rises up from the tidewater of Prince William Sound's Valdez Narrows in approximately 1.5 miles. The mountain was named in 1898 by Captain William R. Abercrombie, presumably for General George Henry Thomas (1816–1870).

== Climate ==
Based on the Köppen climate classification, Mount Thomas is located in a subarctic climate zone with long, cold, snowy winters, and mild summers. Weather systems coming off the Gulf of Alaska are forced upwards by the Chugach Mountains (orographic lift), causing heavy precipitation in the form of rainfall and snowfall. Winter temperatures can drop below −20 °C with wind chill factors below −30 °C. This climate supports an unnamed glacier on the north slope.

== Gallery ==
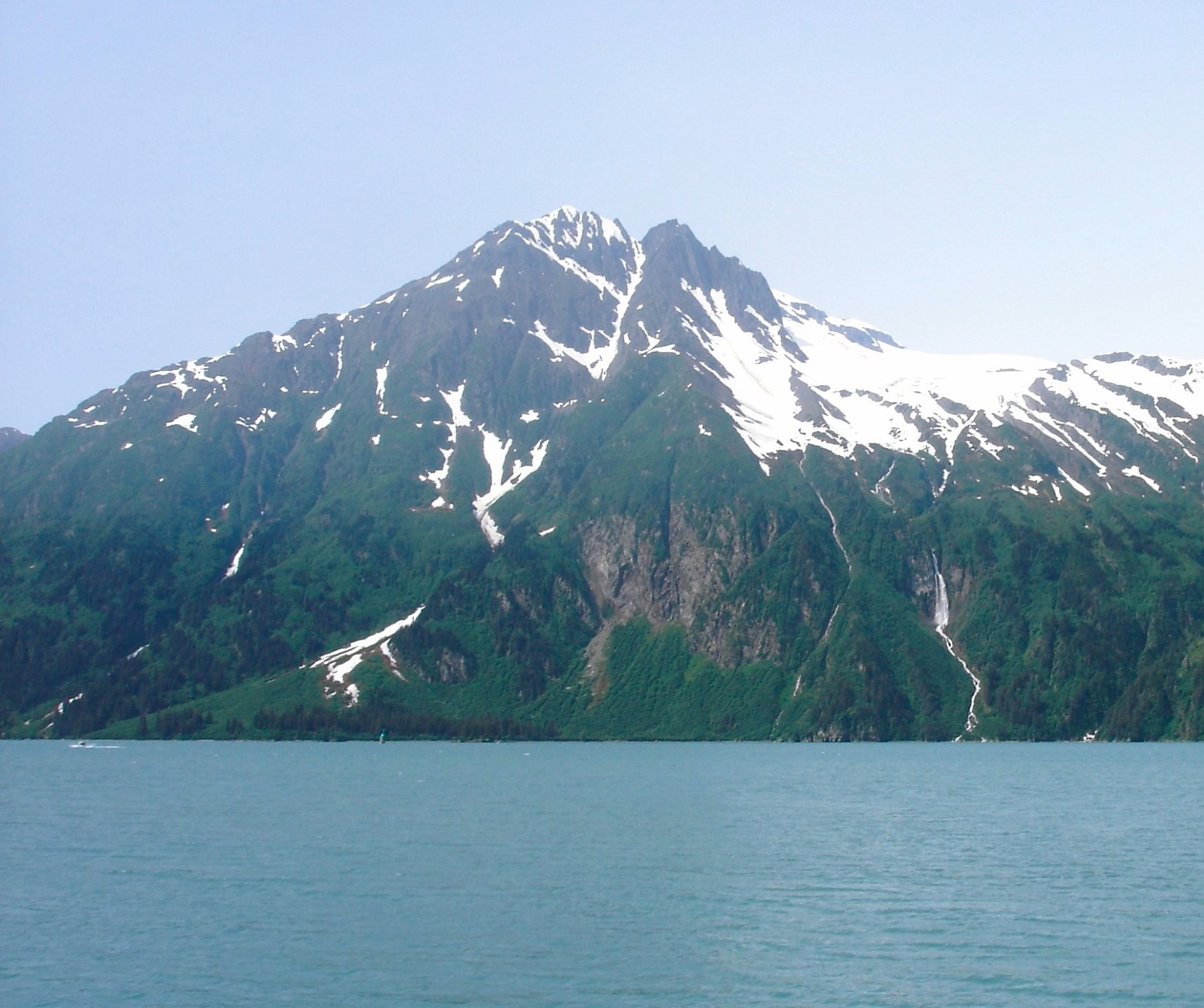
East aspect of Mount Thomas (Anderson Falls at lower right)

== See also ==
- List of mountain peaks of Alaska
- Geography of Alaska
- Charles Mitchell Thomas
