= Long Beach Area Council =

Boy Scouts of America governing body

Long Beach Area Council (#032)
- Owner: Scouting America
- Headquarters: Long Beach, California
- Country: United States
- Founded: 1919
- President/Chairman: Sarah Sangmeister
- Council Commissioner: Steven Richard
- Scout Executive/CEO: Marc Bonner
- Website longbeachbsa.org

The Long Beach Area Council (LBAC), headquartered in Long Beach and founded in 1919, is one of five Scouting America councils in Los Angeles County, California.

== Organization ==
- Iron Star District (Cub Scouts, Scouts BSA, Venturing)
- Neptune District (Sea Scouts)
- New Frontier District (Scoutreach)

== Camps ==
- Camp Tahquitz – Located in Angelus Oaks, California 34.166°N 116.897°W
- Long Beach Sea Base

== Honor camping societies ==
The Long Beach Area Council did not have an Order of the Arrow lodge for many years, but used only its camping honor society, the Tahquitz Community. The Tahquitz Community continues today, but on January 15, 2012 the Long Beach Area Council formed an Order of the Arrow lodge. The new Order of the Arrow Lodge held its first Ordeal the weekend of May 18-20 where the new lodge name, Puvunga Lodge 32, and totem, the porpoise, were chosen. The Lodge was named Puvunga because it was an ancient village and burial site thought to have once been populated by the Tongva people, who are the indigenous inhabitants of the region around Los Angeles, California.

== See also ==
- Scouting in California
- Tahquitz (spirit)
