= Tahquitz (spirit) =

Native American spirit and legend

Tahquitz Táqwish (Cahuilla)
- Spirit of Evil or Death
- Abode: Mount San Jacinto or Tahquitz Canyon
- Gender: Male
- Region: Southern California, Riverside County
- Ethnic group: Native American: Cahuilla, Kumeyaay and Luiseño

Tahquitz (/tɑːˈkwiːts/, sometimes /ˈtɑːkɪts/, Cahuilla: Táqwish) is a spirit found in the legends of the Cahuilla, Kumeyaay and Luiseño Native American people of Southern California. Accounts of the legend vary significantly, but most agree that Tahquitz represents evil or death, and his spirit makes its home on Mount San Jacinto. Some accounts report that he steals people and/or their souls and devours them on the mountain. Tahquitz manifests himself in the form of fireballs, lightning, meteors and thunderous sounds on the mountain and in the canyons.

== Agua Caliente legend ==
Some accounts of the legend state that Tahquitz Canyon played a key role in the story. The canyon is located on the Agua Caliente reservation lands, and is an important cultural site. The tribal group's web page dedicated to the canyon describes The Legend of Taquitz as follows:

Tahquitz was the first shaman created by Mukat, the creator of all things. Tahquitz had much power, and in the beginning he used his power for the good of all people. Tahquitz became the guardian spirit of all shamans and he gave them power to do good. But over time, Tahquitz began to use his power for selfish reasons. He began to use his power to harm the Cahuilla People. The people became angry, and they banished Tahquitz to this canyon that now bears his name. He made his home high in the San Jacinto Mountains in a secret cave below the towering rock known today as Tahquitz Peak. It is said that his spirit still lives in this canyon. He can sometimes be seen as a large green fireball streaking across the night sky. The strange rumblings heard deep within the San Jacinto Mountains, the shaking of the ground, and the crashing of boulders are all attributed to Tahquitz as he stomps about the canyon.

— Agua Caliente Band of Cahuilla Indians

== Mukat's People ==
Author Lowell John Bean, in his book Mukat's People; The Cauilla Indians of Southern California, applies a different orthography, rendering the name as Taqwuš (Taqwush) instead of Tahquitz. He describes Taqwuš as one of the nakutem, those who were created in the beginning by Mukat and Temayawt. Specifically, Taqwuš is the first Puul, or Shaman, and he manifests himself as a meteor or a human-like form that emits blue sparks. Taqwuš lived on San Jacinto Peak and was the cause of misfortune. He was most active at night and would travel about stealing souls.

== Origin and application of the name ==
In the Luiseño language the word Tahquitz derives from the word Takwish, meaning "electric fireball" or "meteor". However, it is thought that the Luiseño adopted the story from the Cahuilla. In A Dried Coyote's Tail, Katherine Saubel spells it Taqwish in Cahuilla. The spelling of the word Tahquitz varied, until it was standardized by the 1897–1898 U.S. Geological Survey of the San Jacinto quadrangle. Alternate spellings include:

- Chaup
- Dakush
- Dakwish
- Shiwiw
- Tacquish
- Tacwitc
- Tahkoosh
- Taakwi
- Takwish
- Taqwuš (Taqwush)
- Taukwitch
- Tau-quitch
- Tauquitch
- Tauquitz

Several peaks on Mount San Jacinto have been named for Tahquitz:

- Tahquitz Peak, an 8,846-foot (2,696 m) secondary peak on Mount San Jacinto
- Tahquitz Rock, an 8,000-foot (2,400 m) large granite outcropping, also called "Lily rock"
- Red Tahquitz, an 8,720-foot (2,660 m) peak that has a reddish hue

Additional features on Mount San Jacinto include:

- Tahquitz Meadow or Valley at the 7,995-foot (2,437 m) elevation
- Tahquitz Canyon and Creek which descend from Tahquitz Peak with a length of about 8 miles (13 km), and about a 7,900-foot (2,400 m) fall
- Tahquitz Falls, within the canyon at the 840-foot (260 m) level

Beyond the mountain, the name Tahquitz has been applied to:

- Tahquitz Canyon Way, a main thoroughfare in Palm Springs that leads to the Palm Springs International Airport
- Tahquitz mousetail, the common name for Ivesia callida, a member of the rose family
- Tahquitz OG, a strain of cannabis
- Tahquitz High School in Hemet, California

== Cultural references ==
- The Tribe of Tahquitz is an Honor Boy Scout organization of the Long Beach Area Council
- Camp Tahquitz is a Long Beach Area Council camp in Angelus Oaks, California
- Tahquitz is a supporting character in the Louis L'Amour novel, The Lonesome Gods (1983), that is mistaken for a demigod of Native American legend and lives in the mountains alone near Agua Caliente. The story features the mountain as well as the Mojave and Colorado Deserts of California as the setting of the story.
- The title of a 1993 novel by Bernnie Reese is Tahquitz Exchange.
- Tahquitz is a major recurring support character in Idyllwild, the second novel in The Sheriff Wyler Scott Series by Mark Paul Sebar.

== See also ==
- Cahuilla traditional narratives
  - Cahuilla mythology
- Luiseño traditional narratives
- Kumeyaay traditional narratives
- List of Riverside County, California, placename etymologies
- Tahquitz (disambiguation)
