= Cahuilla mythology =

For the Cahuillas, cosmological values and concepts were established when the world was created by Mukat. The Cahuilla creation story tells of the origin of the world, the death of god (Mukat), and the consequences of that death for humans (e.g., the need for death, social roles, and so forth). It also describes the basic concepts of supernatural power and its proper use in the contemporary world.

At the beginning of creation, all creatures were said to be much larger than they were today. These were called nukatem. Over time, the nukatem stopped being active and shrank, turning into natural objects such as mirages, rainbows, earth and other things.

== Deities ==
- Kutya'i – Spirit of wind, mischievous, nocturnal, steals clothing.
- Menill – Lunar deity
- Mukat – Creator.
- Muut – Psychopomp, often depicted as an owl.
- Pemtemweha – Protector of animals, often seen as a white deer.
- Sungrey – Medicine, founded the spring Agua Caliente (Hot Water) in the desert.
- Taqwush – A trickster god, he comes out at night to steal souls and cause mischief.

== Creation ==
The creation myth of the Cahuilla is fairly expansive, such that almost all of their mythological figures and norms are included in the tale. In the creation, Mukat and Temayuwat were born from the union of twin balls of lightning, which were the manifestations of Amnaa (Power) and Tukmiut (Night). Mukat and Temayuwat began a creative contest, in which Temayuwat was bested and fled with his ill-formed creation below the earth.

Mukat taught his people the art of fighting with a bow and arrow, which incurred their displeasure. On account of this, they consorted with the Frog to bewitch him. Upon his death, he taught the people mourning ceremonies and a proper form of funerary ritual (by cremation). Along with initiatory rites during puberty, these rites form the essential corpus of Cahuilla religious observance.

== Ritual cremation ==
The Cahuilla response to death was a six night affair intended to mark the passing of a member of the community and put an end to grief. The Cahuilla seem to have had a practical view of death that included it as a necessary component of their world. It was held annually during the winter months, and its date fluctuated according to supplies and internal factors.

Commonly, these rites took place in a large structure called the kis-amnawut (roughly translated as house power-great)). The ritual for the dead was interwoven with other aspects of Cahuilla life; it wasn't until the fourth day of the mourning ritual, for example, that infants of the tribe would be publicly named.

== See also ==
- Cahuilla traditional narratives

== Read further ==
- Apodaca, Paul (1999). Tradition, myth, and performance of Cahuilla bird songs. Unpublished Ph.D. dissertation, Department of Folklore & Mythology, University of California, Los Angeles, CA.
- Apodaca, Paul (with Luke Madrigal) (1999). "Cahuilla bird songs", California Chronicles, 2(2): 4–8.
- Bean, Lowell John (1992). "Menil (Moon): Symbolic Representation of Cahuilla Woman". In Earth & Sky: Visions of the Cosmos in Native American Folklore, edited by Ray A. Williamson and Claire R. Farrer, pp. 162–83. University of New Mexico Press, Albuquerque, NM. (Summary, interpretation, and some original presentation of Cahuilla myths.)
- Curtis, Edward S. The North American Indian. 20 vols. Plimpton Press, Norwood, MA. (Desert and Pass Cahuilla versions of the Creation myth, collected from Charley Alamo and William Pablo, vol. 15, pp. 106–21.)
- Fischer, Millie Wolfe (2001). Footprints Through the Palms. Texas Ink. ASIN B001GTRUMU. OCLC 560777456. "legendary Indian stories"
- Gifford, Edward Winslow, and Gwendoline Harris Block (1930). California Indian Nights. Arthur H. Clark, Glendale, CA. (Three previously published narratives, pp. 196–98, 227–32.)
- Hooper, Lucile (1920). "The Cahuilla Indians". University of California Publications in American Archaeology and Ethnology 16:315–380. Berkeley, CA. (Myths collected in 1918, pp. 317–28, 364–78.)
- Kroeber, A. L. (1925). Handbook of the Indians of California. Bureau of American Ethnology Bulletin No. 78. Washington, DC (Brief comments on the Creation myth, pp. 707.)
- Margolin, Malcolm (1993). The Way We Lived: California Indian Stories, Songs, and Reminiscences. First edition 1981. Heyday Books, Berkeley, CA. (Creation myth, pp. 124–25, from Hooper 1920.)
- Patencio, Francisco; Margaret Boynton (1970) [1943]. Stories and Legends of the Palm Springs Indians. Los Angeles, CA: Times-Mirror. p. 132. LCCN 44018350. OCLC 10803758, 4020904, 19463094
- Patencio, Francisco (1971). Hudson, Roy F. (ed.). Desert Hours with Chief Patencio. Hemerdinger, Bill (illustrations). Palm Springs, CA: Palm Springs Desert Museum. p. 38. "As told to Kate Collins.". LCC E99 C155 P3. OCLC 681440332, 2298555
- Saubel, Katherine Siva (1968). "Adventures of Konvaxmal". Indian Historian 1(4):28. (One myth.)
- Seiler, Hansjakob (1970). Cahuilla Texts. Indiana University Research Center for the Language Sciences, Bloomington, IN.
- Strong, William Duncan (1929). "Aboriginal Society in Southern California". University of California Publications in American Archaeology and Ethnology 26:1–358. Berkeley. (Desert and Pass Cahuilla myths and legends, pp. 86–87, 100–02, 109, 130–43.)
- Woosley, David J. (1908). "Cahuilla Tales". Journal of American Folklore 21:239–40. (Two brief narratives from the Colorado Desert.)
