= Temescal Canyon, Riverside County =

Canyon in Riverside County, California

Temescal Canyon (Temescal, Spanish for "sweat lodge") is the canyon below the mouth of Temescal Valley, carrying Temescal Creek, through the hills in and to the east of El Cerrito, Riverside County, California. The head of the canyon is located at 33°49′38″N 117°30′31″W, while the mouth of the canyon is at 33°51′51″N 117°31′29″W.
