= Tahquitz Peak =

Mountain in California, US

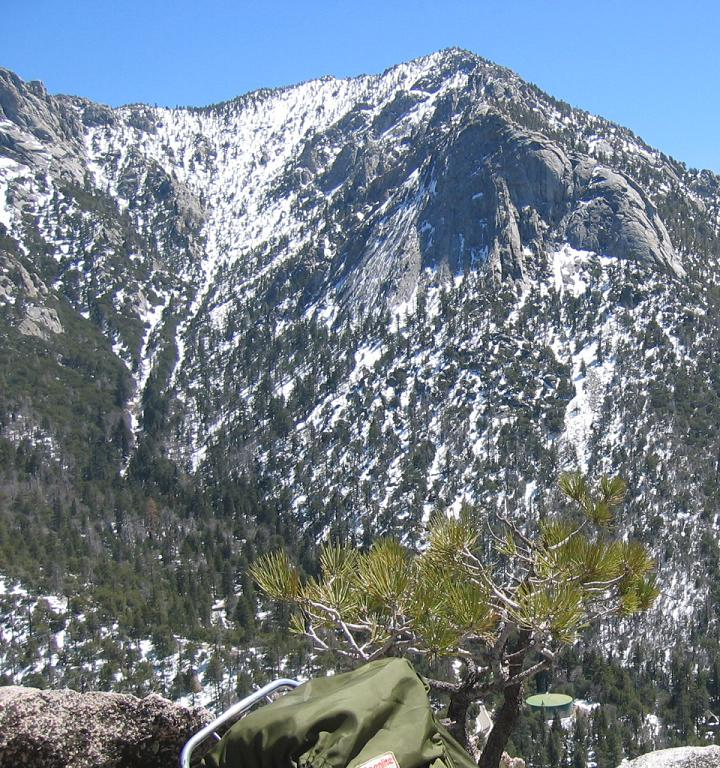
- A view of Tahquitz from Suicide Rock, showing both Lily Rock and the peak

Highest point
- Elevation: 8,846 ft (2,696 m) NGVD 29
- Prominence: 766 ft (233 m)
- Listing: Hundred Peaks Section
- Coordinates: 33°45′19″N 116°40′37″W

Geography
- Location within California Location within the United States
- Location: Riverside County, California, U.S.
- Parent range: San Jacinto Mountains
- Topo map: San Jacinto Peak

Tahquitz Peak (pronounced /tɑːˈkwiːts/, sometimes /ˈtɑːkɪts/) is a granite, 8,846-foot-tall (2,696 m) rock formation located on the high western slope of the San Jacinto mountain range in Riverside County, Southern California, United States, above the mountain town of Idyllwild. Tahquitz has a steep approach hike (approximately 800-foot elevation gain in a half mile), leading to a roughly 1000-foot face. Tahquitz, which can refer to both the rock outcrop and the outcrop's parent peak, is a popular hiking destination to the fire lookout station and the rock climbing area.

The Yosemite Decimal System, widely used in North America to classify hiking and climbing routes, was developed into its modern form at Tahquitz Peak.

== Description ==
Tahquitz Peak can be reached from one of several trails, and is only a half-mile deviation from the Pacific Crest Trail. The most direct route is the South Ridge trail starting in Idyllwild, California. This trail is a direct hike to the peak and is typically used as an "out and back" route, four miles in length, featuring a 2400 ft. elevation gain. Tahquitz Peak can also be achieved via Devil's Slide Trail in Idyllwild, 4.8 miles one way, with a 2350 ft. elevation gain. The peak can be reached from the Palm Springs Aerial Tramway via a ten-mile hike with rolling hills and various ascents and descents.

Tahquitz Peak is used as a fire lookout in the late spring to mid fall, using a two-man ranger station with 270-degree panoramic views.

== History ==
The area was named after the legendary luminous spirit, Tahquitz, which is recognized by multiple Southern California tribes; including:

- Agua Caliente Band of Cahuilla Indians
- Morongo Band of Mission Indians
- Cabazon Band of Cahuilla Indians
- Ramona Band of Cahuilla
- Other Cahuilla groups historically throughout the San Jacinto and Santa Rosa region
- Most if not all of the Kumeyaay tribes within San Diego County

The name first appeared in print on a 1901 USGS San Jacinto topographical map.

Two nearby rock climbing locations are Tahquitz Rock and Suicide Rock.

Tahquitz Rock (also known as Lily Rock) is 0.45 miles (0.72 km) to the northwest of the summit of Tahquitz Peak. It is said to have a lily-white appearance, which might account for the "Lily" name. Another theory is that it was named for Lily Eastman who was the daughter of Dr. Sanford Eastman, the first Secretary and a Director of the "Southern California Colony Association" which later became the city of Riverside.

Suicide Rock is 1.6 miles (2.6 km) to the northwest. Over three hundred climbing routes have been described there.

In 2018, the Cranston Fire burned up the south face of Tahquitz Peak and threatened the fire lookout.

== Climbing history ==
In the 1930s, the Rock Climbing Section (RCS) of the Sierra Club in California started a campaign to identify potential rock climbing locations in southern California. RCS member Jim Smith "discovered" Tahquitz in June 1935. The first fifth-class ascent of Tahquitz, "The Trough" (class 5.4), occurred in August 1936 by Jim Smith, Bob Brinton, and Zene Jasaitis. A month later, Smith and Bill Rice quickly put up the now-classic route, "Angel's Fright" (5.6). In 1937, Dick Jones and Glen Dawson led a first ascent of "The Mechanic's Route", one of the first 5.8s in the country. During the late 1930s, the movie Three on a Rope featured climbing at Tahquitz.

By 1940, about a dozen routes had been established. World War II slowed down development, but activity soon picked back up and fresh faces were seen at Tahquitz. Royal Robbins, a prominent member of the RCS, led the new surge in Tahquitz development in the 1950s. This new group of climbers eschewed some of the time-honored safety techniques of the past, which led to harder and harder climbs being developed, culminating with "The Vampire" in 1959. Though Robbins and Dave Rearick climbed it via aid technique (5.9 A3/4), it was free climbed in 1973 (5.11a) by John Long et al. and is now considered one of the best free climbs in southern California.

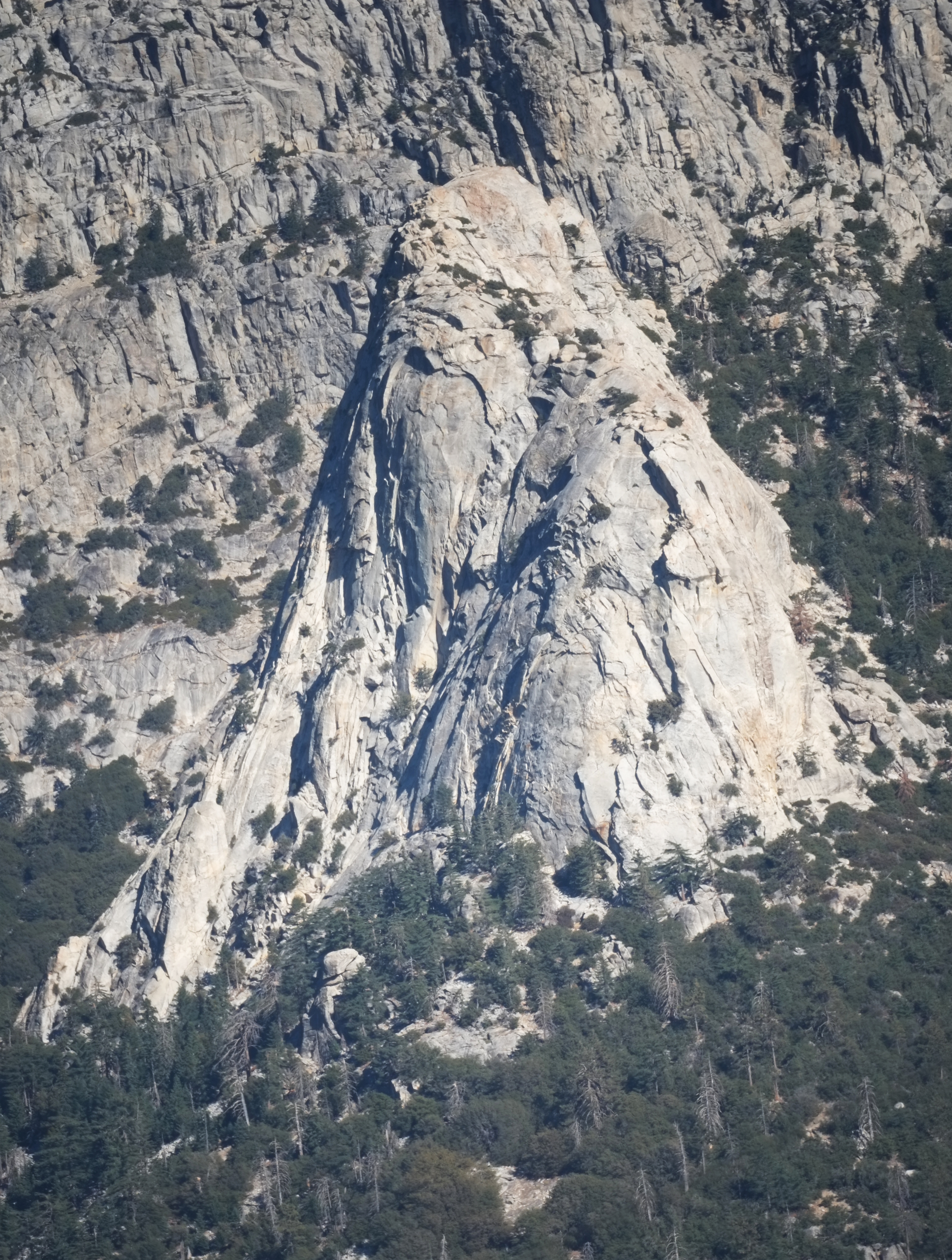
Tahquitz Rock

With the help of new climbing shoe designs, route development in the 1960s jumped well into 5.10 territory. Nearby Suicide Rock also started to be developed, resulting in another southern California classic, "Valhalla" (5.11a) in November 1970.

The Yosemite Decimal System (YDS) of classifying routes was developed at Tahquitz by members of the RCS of the Angeles Chapter of the Sierra Club in the 1950s. Royal Robbins in 1952 established what was then one of the hardest free climbs in the United States, known as "Open Book". As new routes were constantly being discovered and climbed, the old method of rating climbs as either easy, moderate, or hard was quickly becoming useless. With the help of fellow RCS members Don Wilson and Chuck Wilts, the modern system of rating fifth-class climbing was developed, with the scale running from 5.0 to 5.9. Mark Powell, a local who frequented Yosemite, passed this system on to the climbers in Yosemite. By the early 1960s, the Yosemite Decimal System was the standard in the United States.

In 1967, Bob Kamps and Mark Powell established "Chingadera" one of the first 5.11 in the country and setting a new standard in rock climbing.

Most climbers, after the 1970s, considered the area "climbed out" in terms of potential new first ascents. Still, new and quality climbs continued to be added on Tahquitz as well as the smaller rock outcrops nearby, Bob Gaines having established many of them.

The Idyllwild Area Historical Society museum contains a wealth of information about the early climbing history of Tahquitz and Suicide Rock.

== Natural history ==
The plant Ivesia callida is endemic to the San Jacinto Range and is known by the common name Tahquitz mousetail.

== See also ==
- Tahquitz (spirit), the Cahuilla spirit the Peak was named for.

== Climber casualties ==
2022:

- Gavin Escobar and Chelsea Walsh, September 28, 2022
