= Tahquitz Canyon =

Canyon near Palm Springs, California

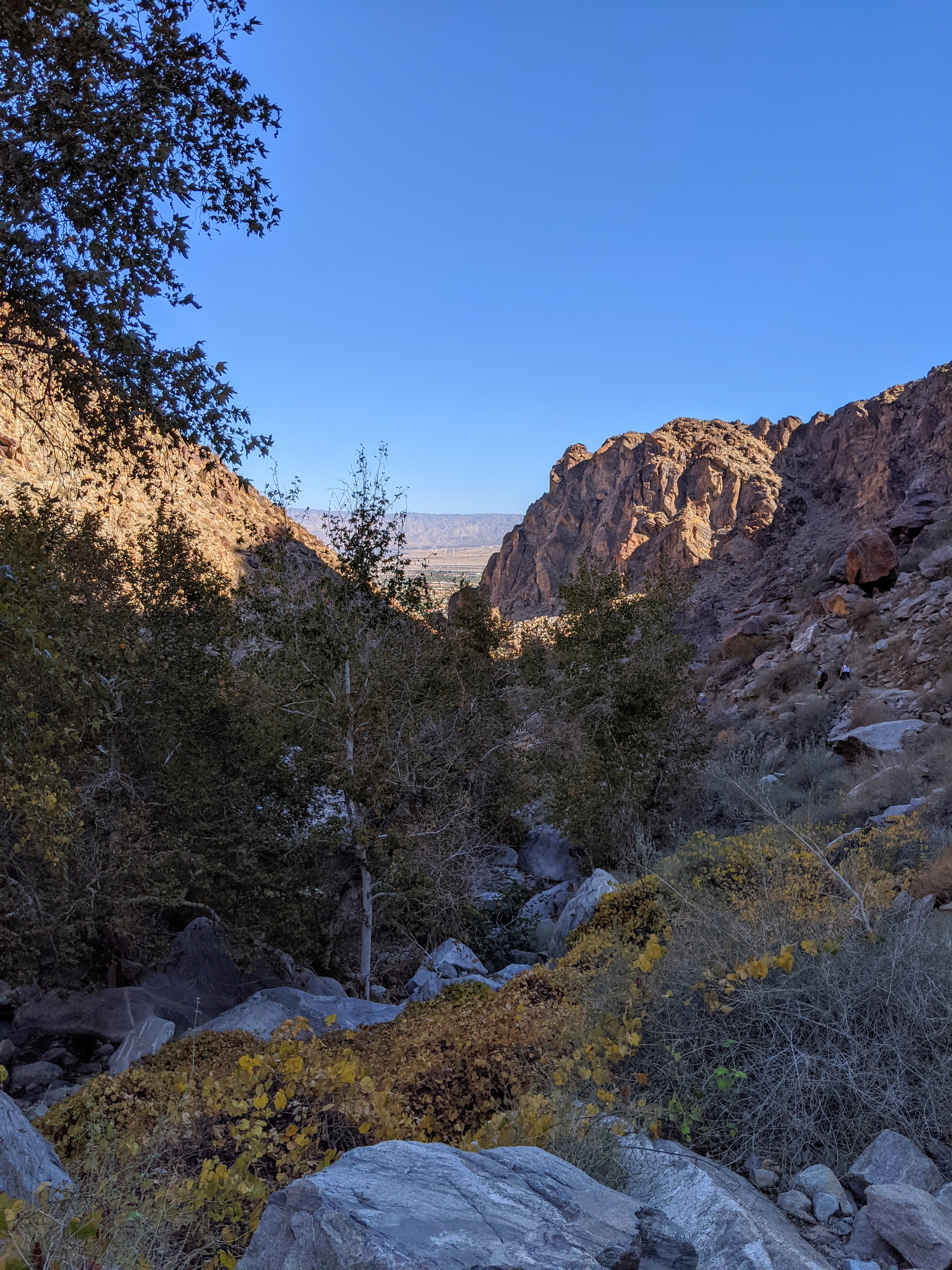
- Tahquitz Canyon view toward Palm Springs
- Floor elevation: 351 ft (107 m)

Geography
- Location: San Jacinto Mountains; Palm Springs, California
- Coordinates: 33°48′36″N 116°33′10″W
- Rivers: Tahquitz Creek
- Interactive map of Tahquitz Canyon
- Elevation listed is for Tahquitz Creek

Tahquitz Canyon (/tɑːˈkwiːts/, sometimes /ˈtɑːkɪts/) is located in Palm Springs, California on a section of the Agua Caliente Indian Reservation. The canyon descends from the Riverside County San Jacinto Mountains. It was continually inhabited for at least 5,000 years by the Native American Cahuilla people, and is one of many canyons of cultural significance to the Cahuilla. Today it is a nature preserve open to the public that is overseen by the Agua Caliente Band of Cahuilla Indians.

A second location in Riverside County also bears the name Tahquitz Canyon. It is a branch canyon of the larger Martinez Canyon in the Santa Rosa Mountains, and is located at the geographic coordinates 33°30′05″N 116°18′30″W.

== Legend of Tahquitz ==
Tahquitz Canyon is an important location in the creation myths of the Agua Caliente band. Although the legend comes in many versions, most regard Tahquitz as a powerful nukatam, roughly "Shaman,"

Small body of water at Tahquitz Canyon in Palm Springs

who was created directly by the creator of the world, Mukat. He became obsessed with a young woman whom he kidnapped and took to Tahquitz canyon, where they lived for several years. Due to her continued unhappiness, Tahquitz allowed her to leave on the condition that she not tell her people what had transpired. She disregarded this warning and was consequently struck dead by Tahquitz's power. The legend states that Tahquitz himself is immortal, that he still imparts power to worthy nukatam, and that he steals the souls of those who venture too far into his canyon at night. He is said to be the cause of the earthquakes in the area, and to reveal himself as a bright ball of green light or a meteor. Other versions of the legend report that Tahquitz was a normal man who gained his powers when he fled his people, as opposed to being directly created by Mukat.

== History of human habitation ==
In the late Quaternary period, the Colorado river had at times discharged its waters into the Salton Basin, rather than the Gulf of California as it does today. This resulted in the formation of a large lake named Lake Cahuilla. The lake was a major food source for the indigenous people of the area, supporting large populations of fish and migratory birds. The Salton Sea currently occupies the lowest level of the former Lake Cahuilla.

At some point, in the past few thousand years, the Colorado River stopped replenishing Lake Cahuilla, and the lake slowly dissipated. Easy access to fresh water, fish, and fowl went away with the lake. This forced the Cahuilla Indians in the area to relocate to new sources of water. Along with Andreas Canyon, Palm Canyon, and Murray Canyon, Tahquitz Canyon was one such location.

Indians living in the canyon created various petroglyphs, most of which are lost today. Stone artifacts were discovered in the canyon including arrow shaft straighteners made from soapstones (steatites) and heated to steam and shape arrows. Fragments of broken ceramic ollas were also found in the canyon, used to store water, seeds and to bury the cremated remains of the dead.

Irrigation ditches in the canyon were used by the Agua Caliente people to carry water to crops before the arrival of outsiders.

== Visitor center and hiking trail ==
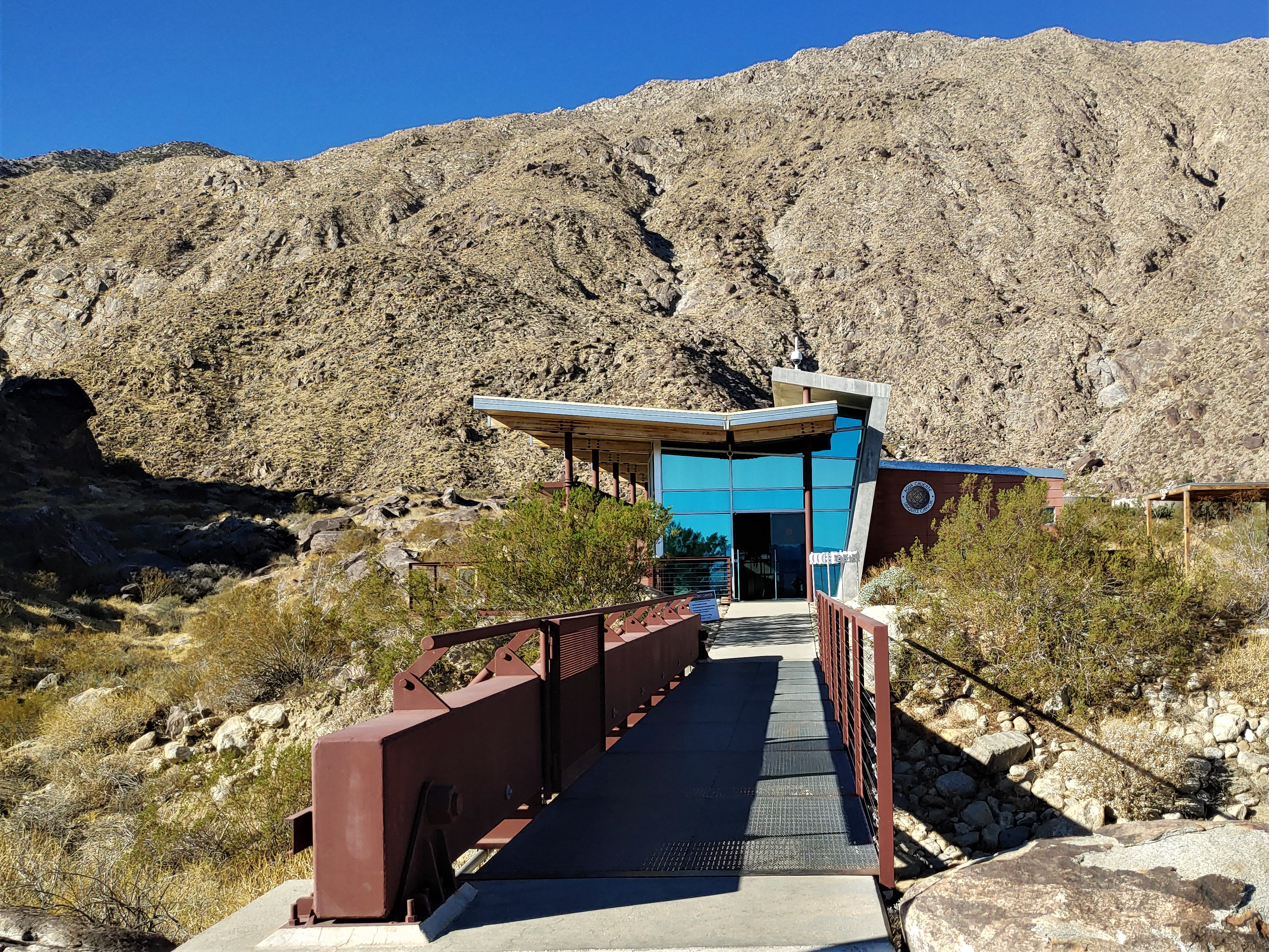
Tahquitz Canyon Visitor Center in Palm Springs, CA.

The Agua Caliente Band maintains a visitor center and hiking trail for the canyon. The trail is a two-mile loop which leads to Tahquitz Falls and back.

== Archaeological project ==
Between 1988 and 1994 an extensive program conducted excavations and retrieval of artifacts and archaeological data in the Canyon. The project produced the largest collection of artifacts and features of any site in the southern California desert and constitutes the most extensive research on the history of the inhabitants of Tahuqitz Canyon, the Kauisiktum clan of the Agua Caliente. The project was conducted prior to the Tahquitz Creek Flood Control Program.

== Wildlife ==
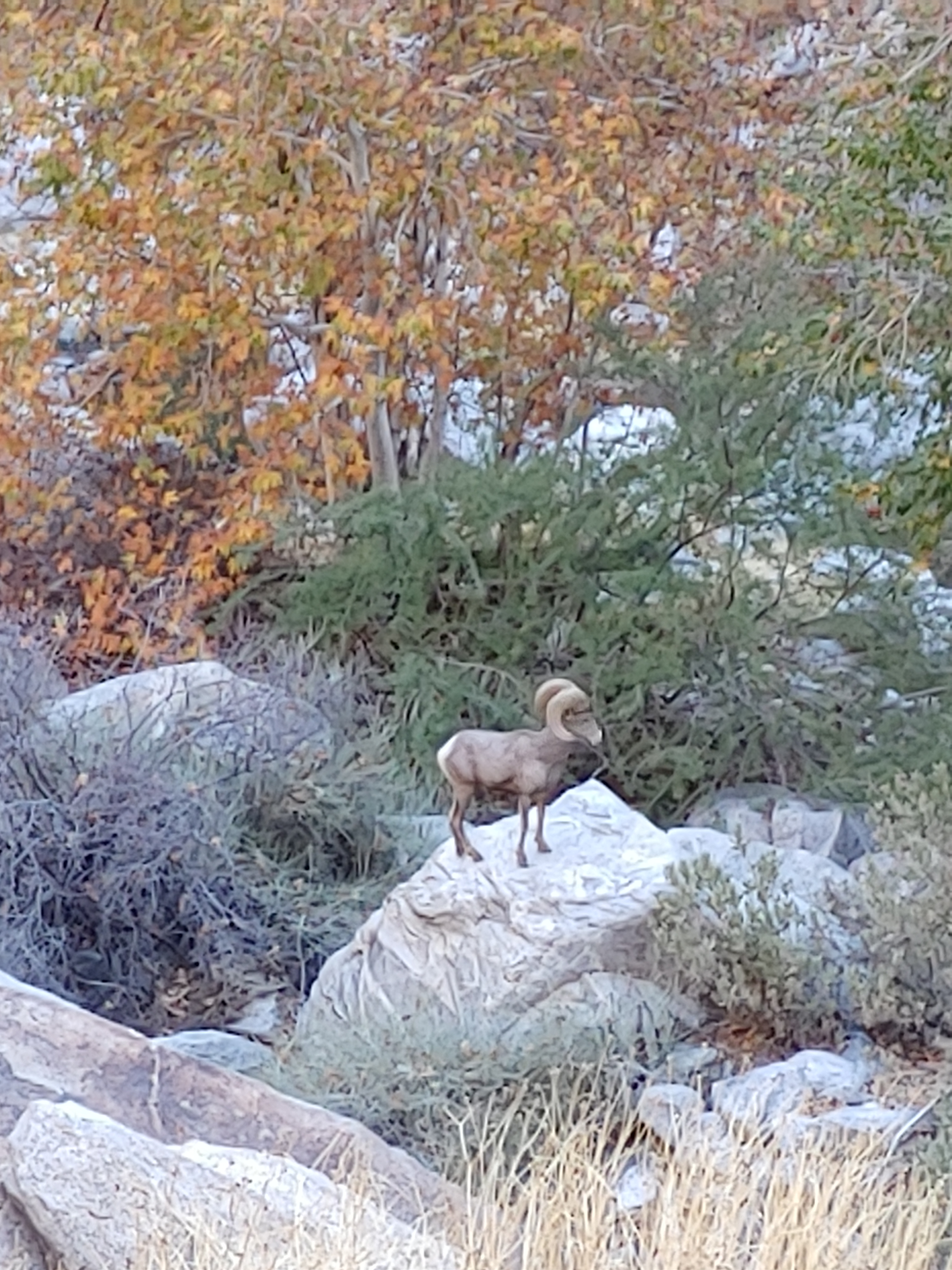
A Bighorn sheep in Tahquitz Canyon.

In 2010, researchers from the San Diego Zoo, U.S. Fish and Wildlife Service, and California Department of Fish and Game reintroduced the endangered Mountain yellow-legged frog into Tahquitz Creek after it had been rediscovered in 2009.

== Flood control ==
Flood control channels were laid in order to manage the threat of devastating flooding occurring during years of heavy rain and snow fall in the mountains of the Tahquitz Canyon. As a consequence of the project, the Tahquitz creek was channeled with the least impact to the resources of the canyon. An excavation project preceded the flood control project.

== Desert Plays ==
From 1921 through 1930 the canyon was used for outdoor plays. The series of three Desert Plays featured Fire and The Arrow Maker by Mary Hunter Austin and one based on the legend of Tahquitz, written by Garnet Holme.

== In film ==
The Tahquitz Falls were used as a scene in Frank Capra's 1937 film Lost Horizon.
