= Tahquitz Falls =

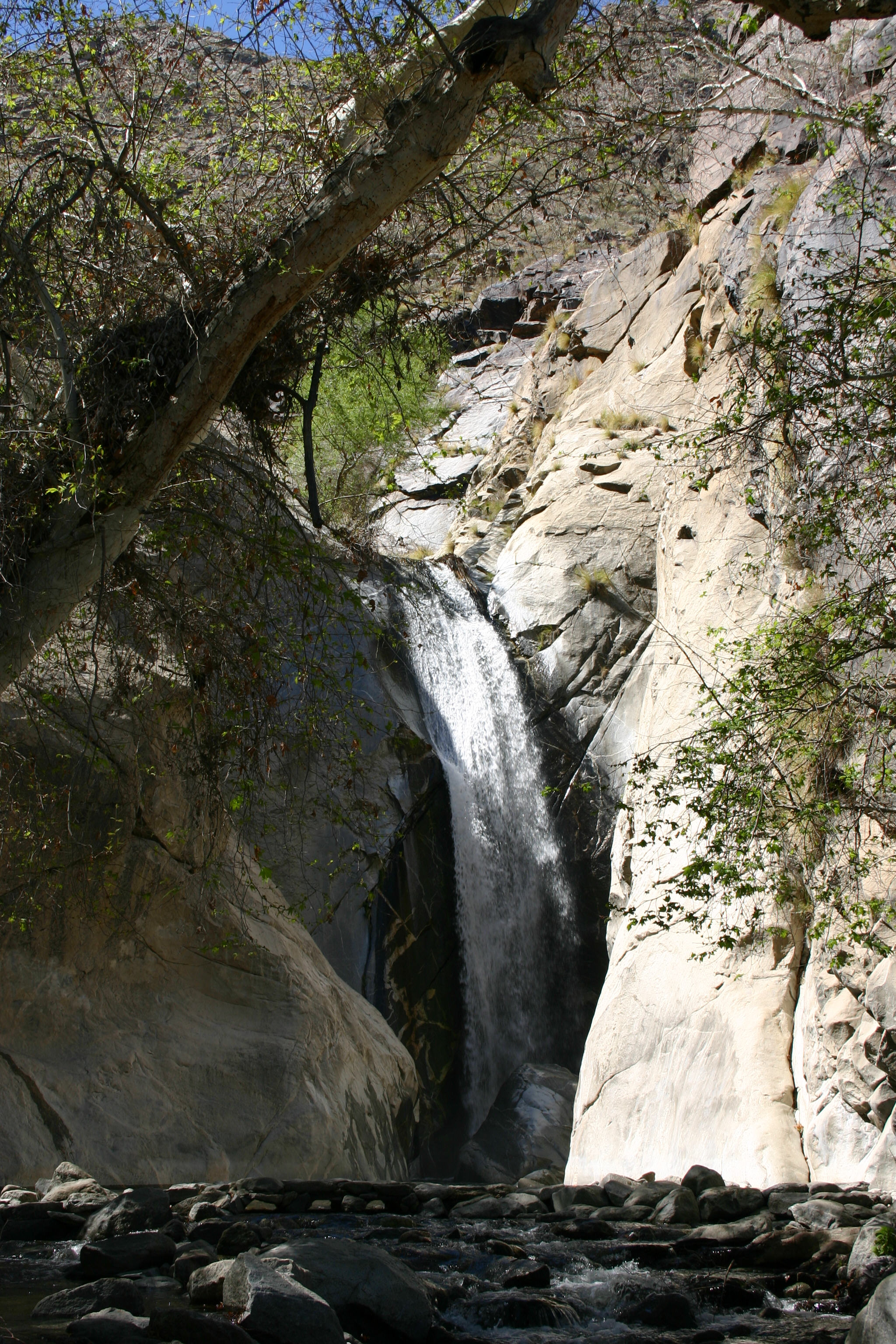
- Tahquitz Falls, facing west
- Interactive map of Tahquitz Falls
- Location: Tahquitz Canyon
- Coordinates: 33.8036°N 116.5617°W
- Type: Staircase
- Elevation: 890 ft (270 m)
- Total height: 60 ft (18 m)

Tahquitz Falls is a waterfall on Tahquitz Creek in the west skirt of the city Palm Springs, in the U.S. state of California. The waterfall is located in lower Tahquitz Canyon, a short distance upstream from the visitor center. The name of the canyon and its waterfall is from the spirit Tahquitz, a Cahuilla native of the Agua Caliente folklore.

The river flows over a slab of granite atop the falls, after which it plunges about 60 feet (18 m) into a pool. The fall is split once by a protrusion on the face of the canyon wall. The Tahquitz Falls is in the boundaries included in the National Register of Historic Places.

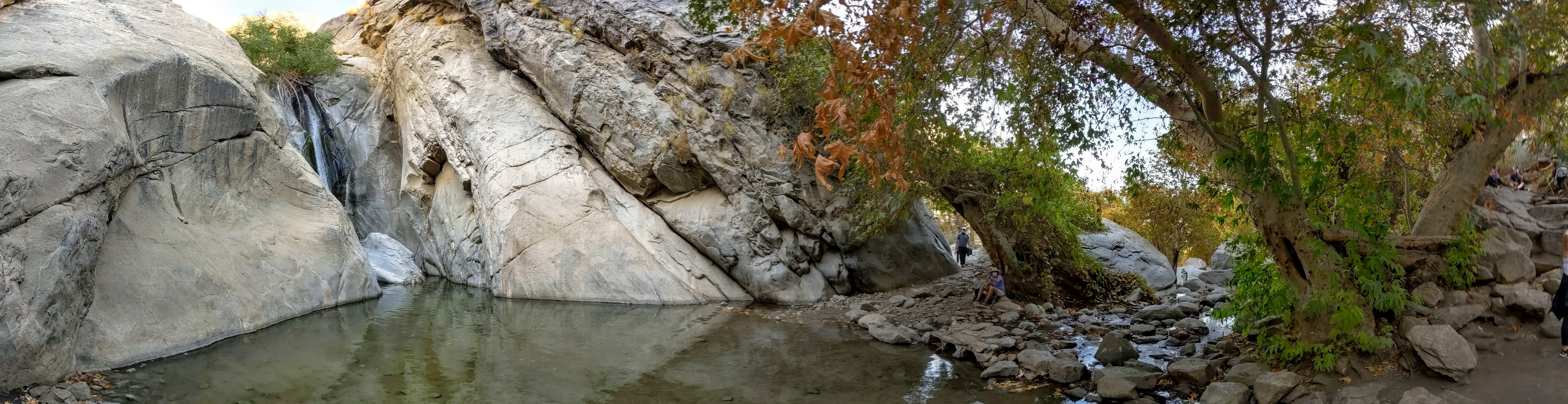
Tahquitz Falls in late fall 2020

== Access ==
The falls are easily reached by proceeding upstream along the Tahquitz Canyon Trail. The trail gains approximately 350 feet (110 m) in altitude and runs past the waterfall forming a loop that returns to the waterfall and to the Visitor Center. The canyon and its trail are owned and managed by the Agua Calientes Band of Cahuilla Indians.

== In popular culture ==
The Tahquitz Falls were used as a scene in Frank Capra's 1937 film Lost Horizon.

The Tahquitz Falls was also used as one of the prominent locations in the Jim Morrison's privately-funded 1969 film HWY: An American Pastoral.

== See also ==
- Tahquitz (spirit), the Cahuilla spirit the falls were named for.
- List of waterfalls
- List of waterfalls in California
