= Cranston Fire =

2018 wildfire in Southern California

- Part of the 2018 California wildfires
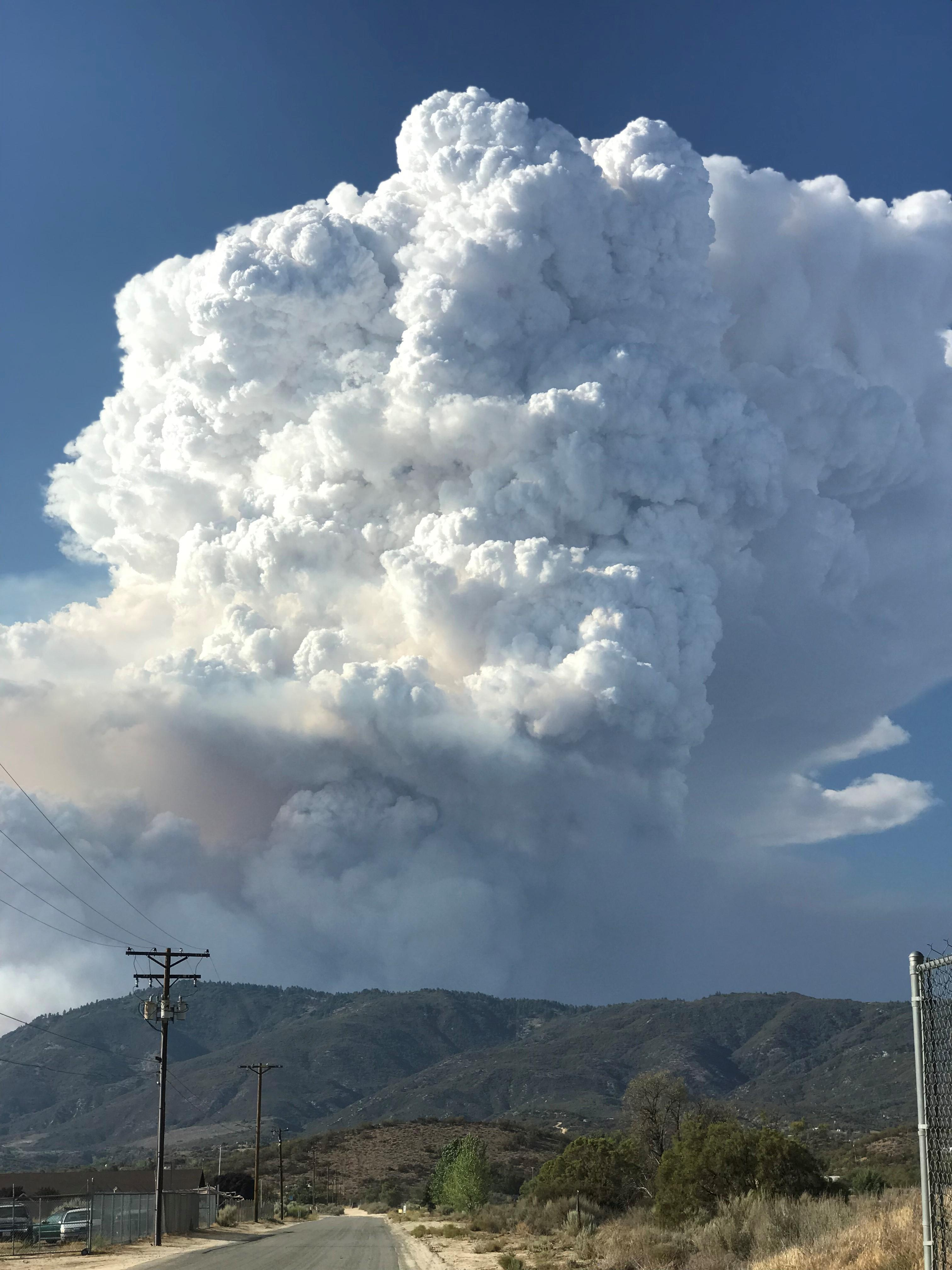
- Cranston Fire on July 26, 2018
- Date: July 25, 2018 –; August 10, 2018
- Location: Mountain Center and Idyllwild, Riverside County, California, United States
- Coordinates: 33.72°N 116.8°W

Statistics
- Burned area: 13,139 acres (53 km^{2})

Impacts
- Deaths: 0
- Injuries: 3
- Structures lost: 12
- Cost: >$22.06 million (2018 USD)

Ignition
- Cause: Arson
- Perpetrator: Brandon N. McGlover

Map
- Perimeter of Cranston Fire (map data)
- Location of fire in California

Location of Cranston Fire

The Cranston Fire was a wildfire that burned in southwest Riverside County, California, in the United States. The fire was started on July 25, 2018, by Brandon M. McGlover, in an act of arson. The fire burned a total of 13,139 acres (53 km^{2}), before it was fully contained on August 10. The Cranston Fire impacted the communities of Idyllwild, Mountain Center, and Anza as well as recreational activities in the Lake Hemet area, San Bernardino National Forest and Mount San Jacinto State Park. Over 7,000 people were evacuated due to the Cranston Fire. These communities also went without power for 11 days in 100° temperatures.

== Progression ==
=== July ===
The Cranston Fire was started on July 25, around noon, by Brandon M. McGlover, who allegedly started numerous fires in the region that day. By the evening, the fire had burned 4,700 acres (19 km^{2}), with five percent containment. Over 2,000 people were evacuated, including Mountain Center, Idyllwild, Lake Hemet, a Girl Scouts camp and more. Portions of Highway 74 and Highway 243 were closed.

The next day, the fire had reached approximately 7,500 acres (30 km^{2}) and was at three percent containment. Evacuations were expanded to include Cedar Glen, Fern Valley, Mount San Jacinto State Park, and Pine Cove. Numerous areas, including campgrounds, in both the State Park and San Bernardino National Forest were closed. The fire was reported to have destroyed five homes.

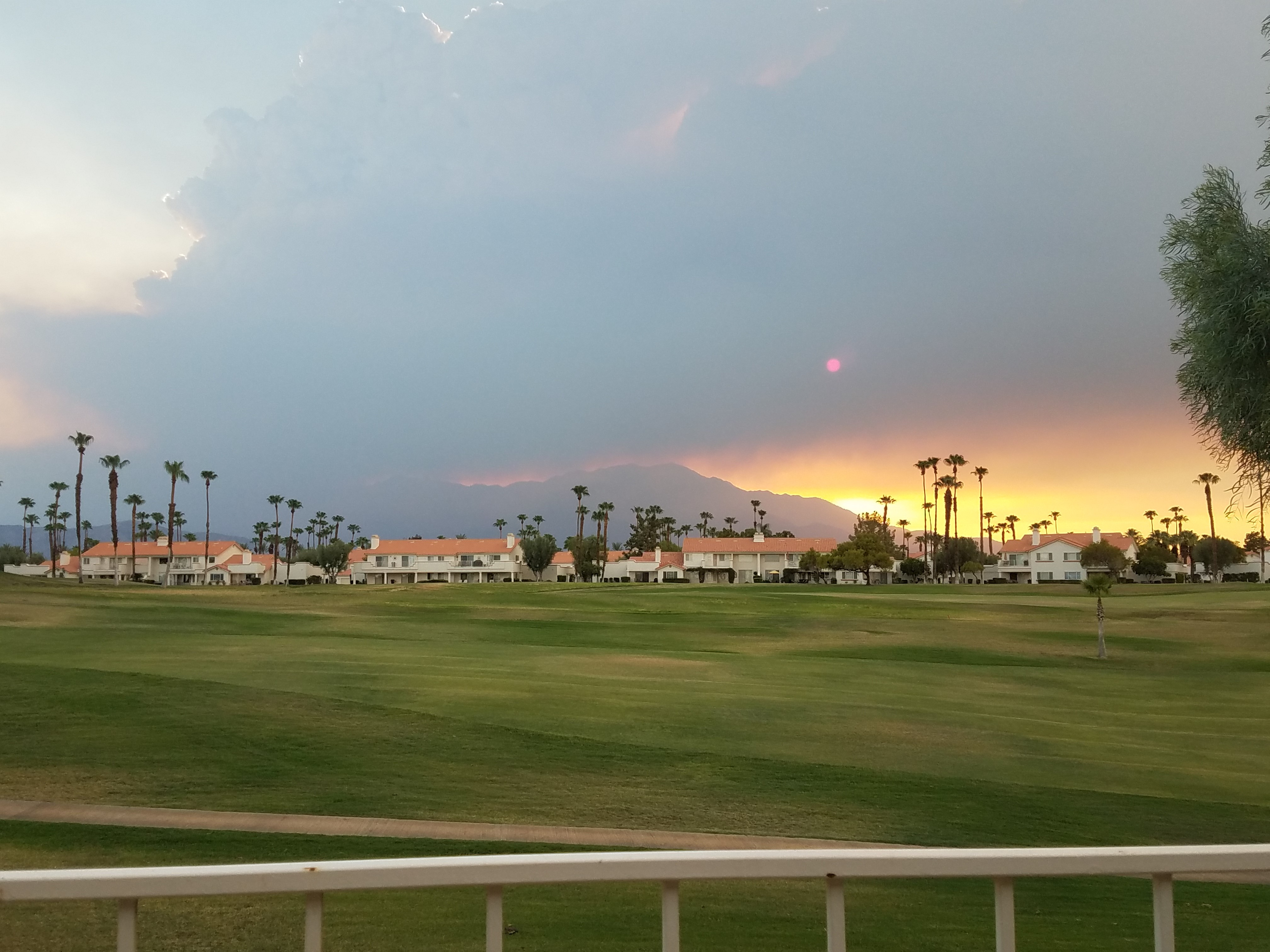
Cranston Fire, as seen from Palm Desert CA July 27, 2018

By July 27, over 7,000 people were evacuated due to the Cranston Fire. The fire had short, active runs in the southeast area of the fire, however, good suppression efforts were made. Caltrans focused on removing debris from highways. By the next day, July 28, two firefighters were reported injured and Hamilton High School was named an evacuation center. The fire continued to grow into Garner Valley. Evacuation orders were put in place, and then lifted later that evening, for Garner Valley. Crews made significant efforts to keep the fire out of the southern and eastern parts of Idyllwild as the fire threatened fire retardant lines. Repopulation began in areas of Garner Valley and on July 29 repopulation started in Fern Valley, Pine Cove, Cedar Glen, and parts of Idyllwild. By that evening, 560 people remained evacuated and the fire had been over half contained. Twelve buildings had been damaged and five damaged. One shelter was closed.

Crews focused on mopping up and securing the fire's edge and containment lines were near finished around Idyllwild. Repair began to reduce erosion and mitigate impacts to natural resources as a result of fire suppression efforts. The next day, July 31, Southern California Edison crews focused on restoring power by installing new power poles. Hazard trees were removed and light precipitation aided in fire suppression. By the evening of July 31, the fire had burned 13,139 acres (53 km^{2}) and was 89 percent contained.

=== August ===
As the Cranston Fire continued to burn into August, no new growth was reported. Teams began to be demobilized as the fire moved towards containment with mop up and suppression repair efforts in progress. Caltrans focused on removing hazardous trees on roadways while Southern California Edison focused on power restoration. Evacuation orders were lifted for Idyllwild, Pine Cove, Fern Valley, Cedar Glen and the western portion of Garner Valley up to Lake View Drive at the Lake Hemet Market. By the morning of August 2, the Cranston Fire had burned 13,139 acres (53 km^{2}) and was 92 percent contained, with 100 percent containment anticipated by August 9. On August 10, 2018, the Cranston Fire was fully contained.

== Effects ==
The fire caused evacuations in residential areas, including Mountain Center, Idyllwild, Pine Cove, and Cedar Glen, as well as evacuations and closures in Mount San Jacinto State Park and the San Jacinto Ranger District of the San Bernardino National Forest. It also caused road closures along Highway 74 and Highway 243, impacting access to Hemet. Parts of Highway 74 and Highway 243 were later closed multiple times due to the threat of mudslides caused by the fire. Areas in the Mountain Center area were also ordered to evacuate multiple times due to this threat. Additionally, it caused numerous trail closures, including the Pacific Crest Trail. Parts of the National Forest were ordered closed until July 31, 2019. Over 7,000 people were evacuated due to the fire.

=== Transportation ===
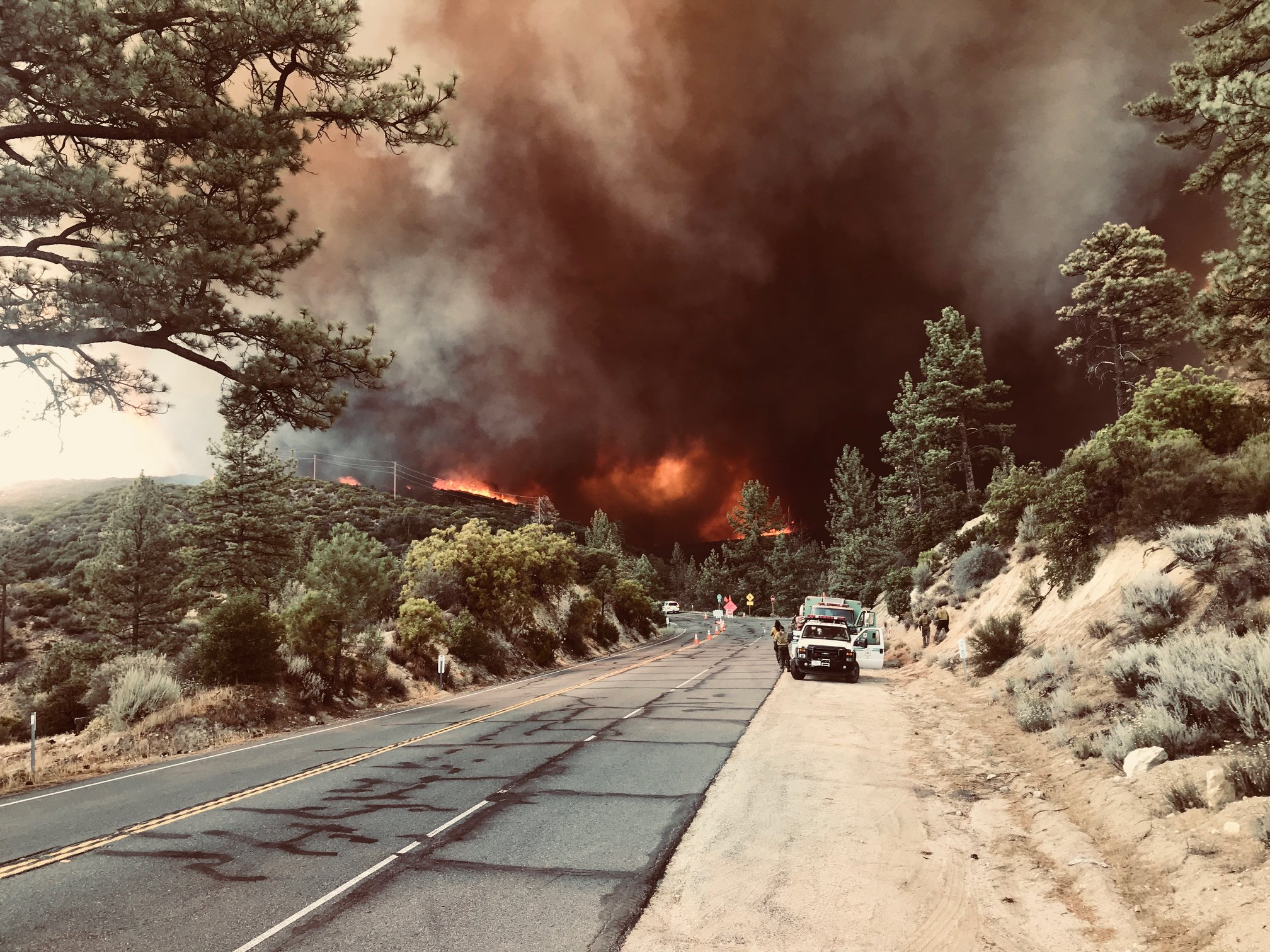
Cranston Fire on July 27

Numerous portions of Highway 74, Highway 371 and Highway 243 were closed as a result of the fire, specifically in the areas of Hemet and Banning. Temporary flight restrictions were in place for the area. The Palm Springs Aerial Tramway was closed for four days due to the fire.

=== Recreation ===
San Bernardino National Forest was closed as a result of the Cranston Fire. Additional recreational closures included Santa Rosa and San Jacinto Mountains National Monument and Mount San Jacinto State Park.

== Investigation ==
On July 25, the same day the fire was reported, CAL FIRE arrested Brandon N. McGlover for setting multiple fires in Riverside County. He was charged with 15 felony counts of arson for starting nine fires. McGlover was sentenced to 12 years and four months in prison, must register as an arsonist for life, and is required to pay restitution to victims.

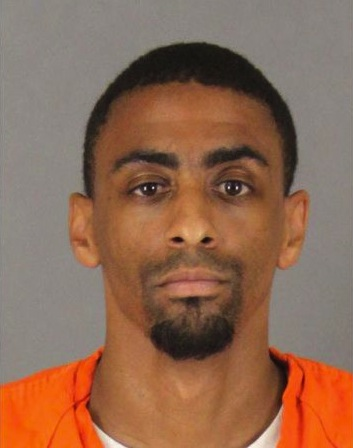
Brandon N. McGlover

== See also ==
- 2018 California wildfires
- List of fires in San Bernardino National Forest
- Mountain Fire
