= List of wildfires in San Bernardino National Forest =

The following is a partial list of wildfires that burned in the San Bernardino National Forest in Southern California, listed with their date of origin.

== List of Fires, start Date and acreage in the Mountaintop and Front Country Ranger Districts ==
- Old Fire (2003)
- Paradise Fire (2005)
- Blaisdell Fire (2005)
- Thurman Fire (2005)
- Plunge Fire (2006)
- Arrastre Fire (2006)
- Ramp Fire (2006)
- Heart-Millard Complex (2006)
- Emerald Fire (2006)
- Pinnacles Fire (2006)
- Jefferson Fire (2006)
- Butler Fire (2007)
- Butler II Fire (2007)
- Slide Fire (2007)
- Hathaway Fire (June 9, 2013)
- Sierra Fire (2013)
- Etiwanda Fire (2014)
- Lake Fire (2015)
- North Fire (2015)
- Scales Fire (2015)
- Summit Fire (2015)
- Pilot Fire (2016)
- Blue Cut Fire (2016)
- Ken Fire (2016)
- Tower Fire (2017)
- Holcomb Fire (2017)
- Mart Fire (June 27, 2017)
- Bridge 2 Fire (July 14, 2017)
- Mile Fire (July 31, 2017)
- Bryant Fire (August 3, 2017)
- Dollar Fire (2017)
- Helen Incident (January 15, 2018)
- Creek Fire (June 30, 2018)
- Valley Fire (2018) (July 6, 2018)
- Box Fire (July 6, 2018)
- Apple Fire (7/31/20, 33,424 acres)
- El Dorado Fire (9/5/20, 22,744 acres)
- South Fire (August 2021)

== List of Fires in the San Jacinto Ranger District ==
- Bee Canyon Fire (1996)
- Oak Fire (2006)
- Esperanza Fire (2006)
- Apache Fire (2008)
- Mountain Fire (2013)
- Tram Fire (2013)
- Silver Fire (2013)
- Little Fire (2013)
- Anza Fire (2015)
- Rouse Fire (2017)
- Azalea Fire (2017)
- Mount Fire (2017)
- Name Unknown (June 10, 2018)
- Saunders Fire (June 14, 2018)
- Indian Fire (June 14, 2018)
- Cranston Fire (July 25, 2018)
- Ribbon Fire (July 26, 2018)
- Fern Fire (July 22, 2020)
- Bonita Fire (January 2021)
- Flats Fire (June 2021)

== Esperanza Fire ==
The Esperanza Fire was a large, wind-driven, arson-caused wildfire that started on October 26, 2006, in a river wash near Cabazon, California, west of Palm Springs, California. By October 29, 2006, it had burned over 41,173 acres (166.62 km^{2}) (or 61 square miles (160 km^{2})) and was 85% contained. On October 30, 2006, the fire was fully contained. Five firefighters were killed defending a vacant house locally known as the "Octagon" that was ultimately destroyed by the fire: Jason McKay, Jess McLean, Daniel Najera, Mark Loutzenhiser, and Pablo Cerda.

== Mountain Fire ==
The Mountain Fire was a wildfire in July, 2013 in Riverside County, California, about 100 miles east of Los Angeles. It burned primarily in the San Jacinto Mountains in the San Bernardino National Forest. It started on July 15, 2013 at 1:43 PM near the junction of Highway 243 and Highway 74. It burned for 16 days on steep slopes of timber and chaparral above Palm Springs. Heavy rainfall, up to 1.5 inches (3.8 cm), on July 21 helped bring the blaze under control. It was fully contained on July 30, 2013.
