= WNKI578 =

- Idyllwild, California; United States
- Broadcast area: San Jacinto Mountains communities
- Frequency: 1610 kHz

Programming
- Format: Emergency information

Ownership
- Owner: Idyllwild Fire Protection District

History
- First air date: 1987

Technical information
- Power: 10 watts
- Transmitter coordinates: 33°44′49.1″N 116°42′54.1″W

WNKI578 (1610 AM) is a travelers' information station licensed to and operated by the Idyllwild Fire Protection District and located in Idyllwild, California, United States. It is licensed by the Federal Communications Commission to transmit with a power of 10 watts.

The main purpose of WNKI578 is to broadcast current emergency information, including road conditions, weather updates, and evacuation orders, for the communities of Idyllwild, Fern Valley, Pine Cove, and parts of Mountain Center.

== History ==
WNKI-578 was established by the Emergency Radio Committee and Coordinated Resources Management and Planning Group in 1987 in order to provide an emergency broadcast station serving local mountain communities of the San Jacinto Mountains.

The prior operating organization, the Mile High Radio Club, was formed around the same time and uses volunteers to maintain operations. In 2014, the club signed an agreement with the Idyllwild Fire Protection District for the operations and oversight of the station through the joint coordination and cooperation of the organizations.

In 2018, the station was used to broadcast emergency information related to the Cranston Fire from a variety of government agencies and, once residents began to return to Idyllwild, from nongovernmental entities including the American Red Cross, Edison, Verizon, and AT&T.

In 2021, the Riverside County Board of Supervisors allocated more than $210,000 of federal Homeland Security grant funds for a two year project to increase station coverage by installing additional transmitters as part of the Idyllwild & San Jacinto Mountains Emergency Outdoor Warning System.
