= Mountain Fire (2013) =

2013 wildfire in Southern California

- Part of the 2013 California wildfires
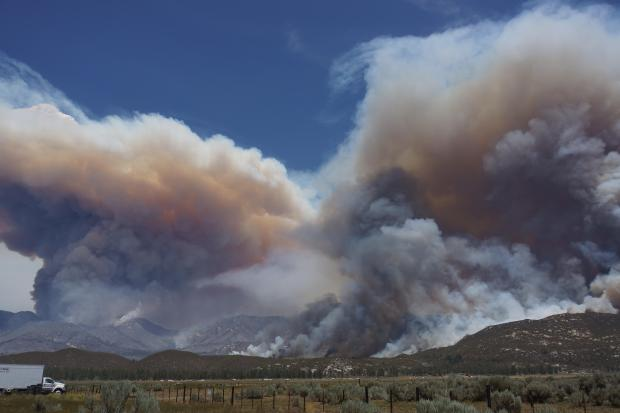
- Date: July 15, 2013 –; July 30, 2013
- Location: Mountain Center, Riverside County, California
- Coordinates: 33.705°N 116.726°W

Statistics
- Burned area: 27,531 acres (111 km^{2})

Impacts
- Structures lost: 23
- Cost: $25.8 million (2013 USD)

Map
- Location of fire in Southern California

The Mountain Fire was a wildfire in July, 2013 in Mountain Center, Riverside County, California, about 100 miles east of Los Angeles. It burned primarily in the San Jacinto Mountains in the San Bernardino National Forest. It started on July 15, 2013 at 1:43 PM near the junction of Highway 243 and Highway 74. It burned for 16 days on steep slopes of timber and chaparral above Palm Springs. Heavy rainfall, up to 1.5 inches (3.8 cm), on July 21 helped bring the blaze under control. It was fully contained on July 30, 2013.

Cal Fire investigators said the fire was caused by a failure of "some type of electrical equipment" on private property and was not related to utility company equipment. At the fire's peak there were 3,500 firefighters on the lines as well as 20 helicopters, 12 airplanes and 260 engines. The cost of fighting the fire was estimated at $25.8 million.

== Progression ==
Initial response to the fire was also delayed by Cal Fire and Riverside County Fire due to a breakdown of an agreement made with the Idyllwild Fire Department, the closest fire station to the origin of the fire, causing resources from further away to be sent to the incident first.

For a time the fire threatened the town of Idyllwild and other small towns. The Palm Springs Aerial Tramway and Mount San Jacinto State Park were closed due to unhealthful air quality, and many neighboring areas were warned of possible unhealthful air conditions. The fire reached to within 2 miles of Palm Springs, which was draped by a blanket of ash and smoke.

== Effects ==
Nearly 6,000 residents of the Idyllwild and Fern Valley areas were ordered to evacuate; those communities were not damaged by the fire and the evacuation orders were lifted July 21. Evacuation centers were set up at Hemet High School in Hemet, Hamilton High School in Anza and Beaumont High School in Cherry Valley.

Evaluating the effect of the fire, scientists say it may prove to be healthy for the Mount San Jacinto environment, because in many areas it burned away the understory (leaf litter, brush and downed timber) while leaving the taller trees intact. Rich Minnich, a fire scientist from the University of California, Riverside, said this was a poster child for how Southern California wildfires should burn. "We got an old-growth forest that burned slowly in good weather," he said. "We got a fantastic house cleaning. Someone finally vacuumed the rugs." Ken Kietzer, a scientist with the California state parks, echoed the assessment, saying the fire appears to have worked out well for Mount San Jacinto State Park. "When the fire got into the park, it was for the most part not a crown fire. It was a creeping ground fire. That is going to be very favorable to reducing the buildup of ground fuels and thinning out some of the smaller, shade tolerant understory, which will probably in the long run be a benefit for the park."

A team of researchers from the San Diego Natural History Museum had been in the area studying the flora and fauna of Mount San Jacinto for comparison with a similar study done 100 years earlier by zoologist Joseph Grinnell; they were forced by the fire to evacuate their research camp. They are finding that the forest is much more dense than it was 100 years ago, partly due to decades of fire suppression. The increased density has altered the animal population as well as making the area more susceptible to large, damaging fires.

== Litigation ==
In 2015 Cal Fire sued Dr. Tarek M.A. Al-Shawaf, the owner of the property on which the fire started, and two of his employees, for damages in state court. In November 2018 they settled the suit for $1.6 million. A separate lawsuit by private parties was settled for $3.1 million.

On the next-to-last day before the statute of limitations would run, the DOJ U.S. Attorney's office sued Al-Shawaf and his two caretakers in federal court for some $25 million in fire suppression costs and damage to federal lands. But in July 2019 the DOJ dropped its much larger federal lawsuit against Al-Shawaf "in the interest of justice," citing the state court settlement and asserting "new evidence." The DOJ U.S. Attorney's Office refused to identify the “new evidence” or further discuss the matter when pressed by the local newspaper, the Idyllwild Town Crier.

Al-Shawaf is a wealthy Saudi businessman — founder, president and chairman of Saudconsult, the oldest and largest engineering and architectural firm in Saudi Arabia. He also is a former official in the Saudi government.
