= Skyline Trail =

Skyline Trail can refer to at least six different nature trails:

- the trail in Jasper National Park in Alberta or
- the trail in the Berkeley-Oakland hills, part of Skyline Gardens Project.
- the trail that is part of the Cape Breton Highlands National Park in Nova Scotia or
- the trail that is located in the Pecos Wilderness of the Carson and Santa Fe National Forests in New Mexico, or
- the lower portion of the Cactus to Clouds Trail in California or
- the trail in Mount Rainier National Park, or
- the trail in the Malheur National Forest in Oregon or
- the Oregon Skyline Trail, the predecessor trail to the Pacific Crest Trail in Oregon
