= Hemet High School =

Location
- 41701 East Stetson Avenue; East Hemet, CA 92544; USA
- 33°43′13″N 116°56′03″W

Information
- Type: Public high school
- Established: 1894
- School district: Hemet Unified School District
- Principal: Jeffrey Franks
- Teaching staff: 107.12 (FTE)
- Enrollment: 2,414 (2024-2025)
- Student to teacher ratio: 22.54
- Colors: Red & Gold
- Newspaper: The Bulldog
- Yearbook: Tahquitz
- Website: http://www.hemethigh.com/

Hemet High School is a public high school of approximately 2,500 students located in East Hemet, California, United States, and is part of the Hemet Unified School District. Hemet High is accredited by the WASC Accrediting Commission for Schools. From its founding in 1894 to 1965 the school was known as Hemet Union High School.

== History ==
Hemet High School was first founded in 1894 and has been moved to different campus sites in the past. The school has been operating at its present campus site since 1972. Hemet High is accredited by the WASC, NATEF, and AYES Accrediting Commissions for Schools. The campus began construction expansion again, including the addition of two new academic buildings, a theater, and several shade structures, completed during the summer of 2012 (first being used in the 2012-2013 school year).

The school was used as an evacuation center during the Mountain Fire in July 2013.

== Sports ==
=== Fall season ===
•Football

•Girls' Volleyball

•Cross Country

•Girls' Golf

•Girls' Tennis

•Boys' Water Polo

=== Winter season ===
•Boys' Basketball

•Girls' Basketball

•Boys' Soccer

•Girls' Soccer

•Wrestling

•Girls' Water Polo

=== Springs season ===
•Baseball

•Softball

•Boys' Track & Field

•Girls' Track & Field

•Boys' tennis

•Boys' Swimming

•Girls' Swimming

Boys’ lacrosse

Girls’ lacrosse
