= Lake Hemet Dam =

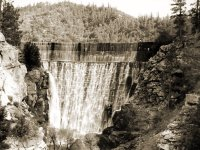
- Lake Hemet Dam – 1895

- Location within California
- Location: Mountain Center, Riverside County, California
- Coordinates: 33°39′53″N 116°42′24″W
- Status: In use
- Construction began: 1891; 135 years ago
- Opening date: 1895; 131 years ago
- Operator: Lake Hemet Municipal Water District

Dam and spillways
- Type of dam: Masonry (arch)
- Impounds: San Jacinto River (South Fork)
- Height: 135 ft (41 m)

Reservoir
- Creates: Lake Hemet
- Total capacity: 14,000 acre⋅ft (17,000,000 m^{3})
- Surface area: 470 acres (190 ha)

Lake Hemet Dam, located in Mountain Center, California, impounds the South Fork of the San Jacinto River and creates Lake Hemet. The dam and lake are surrounded by the San Bernardino National Forest. The dam is operated by the Lake Hemet Municipal Water District, which supplies water to parts of the cities of Hemet and San Jacinto as well as the Garner Valley community of Mountain Center.

== History ==
Construction of the Lake Hemet Dam began on January 6, 1891, by the Lake Hemet Water Company. Construction was completed in 1895. When built, the Lake Hemet Dam was the largest solid masonry dam in the world at a height of 122.5 feet (37.3 m) until it was surpassed in height by the Roosevelt Dam in 1911. In 1923, the height of the dam was increased to 135 feet (41 m). The Lake Hemet Municipal Water District was founded on September 27, 1955, to take over the activities of the Lake Hemet Water Company, purchasing the Lake Hemet water system with funds raised through a bond initiative.

The dam was constructed with Portland cement due to its ability to set underwater; however, Portland cement was not available in the western United States at the time of construction. The cement needed for the construction of the dam was purchased from sources in Antwerp, Belgium, shipped around the south of South America, as the Panama Canal had not yet been built. It was then shipped by railroad to San Jacinto where it was loaded onto mule-drawn wagons to be transported up the mountain.
