= San Jacinto Peak =

Mountain in California

- San Jacinto Mountain, Táqwish Héki' (Cahuilla), Chaawp Nyewaa (Kumiai)
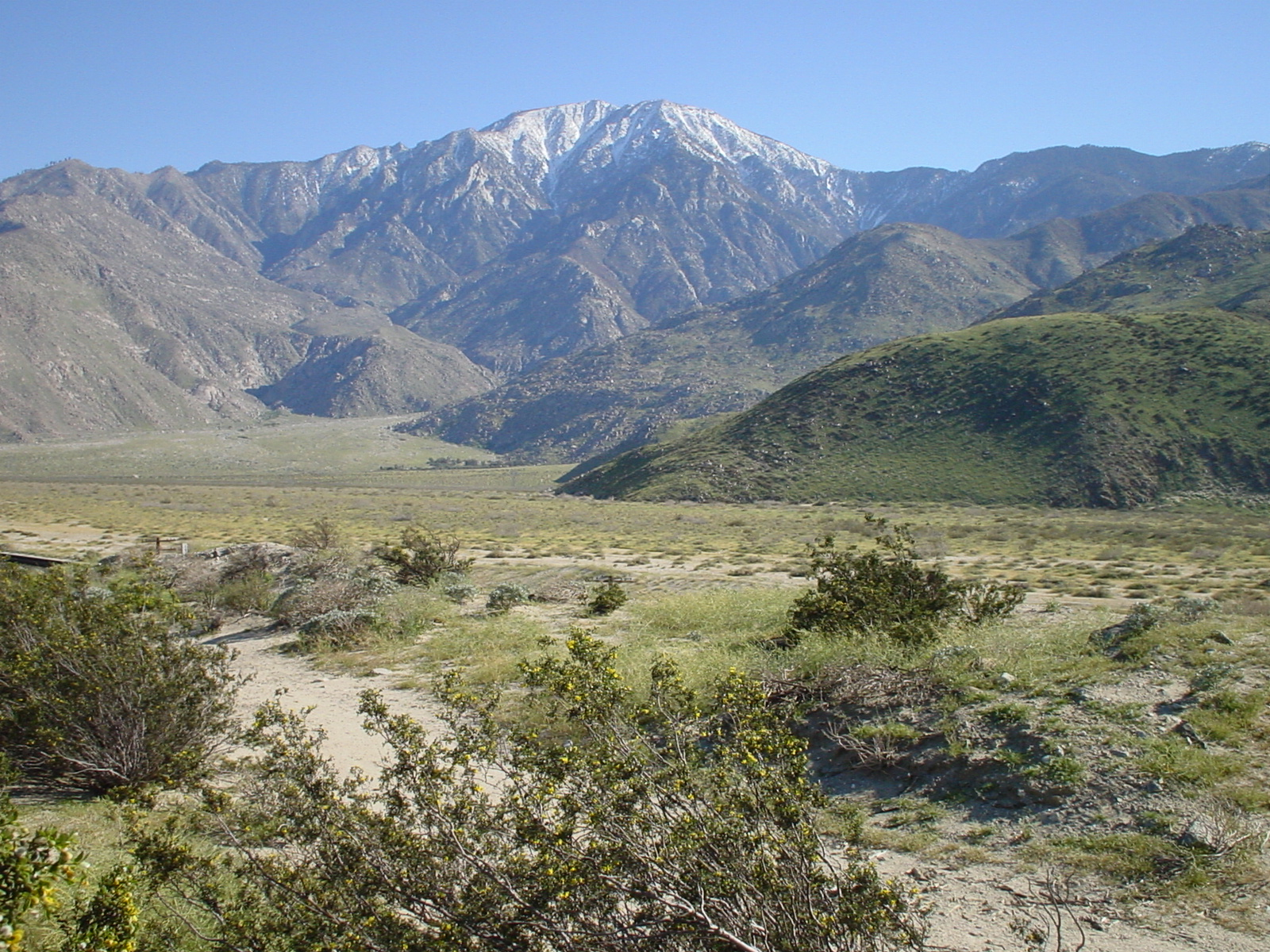
- The northern slopes and foothills of the peak

Highest point
- Elevation: 10,834 ft (3,302 m) NAVD 88
- Prominence: 8,319 ft (2,536 m) ↓ San Gorgonio Pass
- Isolation: 20.3 mi (32.7 km) → Bighorn Mountain
- Listing: California county high points 12th; US most prominent peaks 17th; North America prominent peaks 32nd; Hundred Peaks Section; Three Saints; Ultra prominent peak
- Coordinates: 33°48′53″N 116°40′46″W

Naming
- English translation: Saint Hyacinth's Peak
- Language of name: Spanish

Geography
- Location within southern California Location within California Location within the United States
- Location: Riverside County, California, U.S.
- Parent range: San Jacinto Mountains
- Topo map: USGS San Jacinto Peak

Climbing
- First ascent: 1874 by "F. of Riverside"
- Easiest route: Tramway and trail hike

San Jacinto Peak (/ˌsæn həˈsɪntoʊ, - dʒəˈ-, - jəˈ-/ SAN hə-SIN-toh, - jə-, - yə-; often designated Mount San Jacinto; colloquially known as San J, San Jack and just Jacinto) is a 10,834 ft (3,302 m) peak in the San Jacinto Mountains, in Riverside County, California. Lying within Mount San Jacinto State Park it is the highest both in the range and the county, and serves as the southern border of the San Gorgonio Pass.

San Jacinto Peak is one of the most topographically prominent peaks in the United States, and is ranked the sixth most prominent peak in the 48 contiguous states. According to John W. Robinson and Bruce D. Risher, authors of The San Jacintos, "No Southern California hiker worth his salt would miss climbing 'San Jack' at least once."

Known for its spectacular north escarpment, the peak rises over 8,000 feet (2,400 m) above San Gorgonio Pass. It plays host to the famous Cactus to Clouds Trail.

== Geography ==
To the east of San Jacinto, the 10,834 ft (3,302 m) peak towers over the city of Palm Springs (elevation 479 ft; 146 m); to the west, it borders the mountain community of Idyllwild (elevation 5,413 ft; 1,650 m). The peak is also frequently called Mount San Jacinto. The steep escarpment of its north face, above Snow Creek, climbs over 10,000 feet (3,000 m) in 7 miles (11 km). This is one of the largest gains in elevation over such a small horizontal distance in the contiguous United States.

From the peak, San Gorgonio Mountain can be seen across the San Gorgonio Pass. Also easily visible below is the Coachella Valley and the Salton Sea. In addition, much of the Inland Empire, including Ontario to the west, can be viewed on a clear day.

Named after Hyacinth of Caesarea, Mount San Jacinto is one of the "Four Saints," a name occasionally used to describe the high points of the four mountains over 10,000 feet named for Catholic saints in Southern California: San Jacinto Peak, San Gorgonio Mountain (high point of the San Bernardino Mountains), San Bernardino Peak, and Mount San Antonio (high point of the San Gabriel Mountains).

=== Climate ===
Climate data for San Jacinto Peak 33.8144 N, 116.6817 W, Elevation: 10,233 ft (3,119 m) (1991–2020 normals)
Month	Jan	Feb	Mar	Apr	May	Jun	Jul	Aug	Sep	Oct	Nov	Dec	Year
Mean daily maximum °F (°C)	38.8 (3.8)	37.7 (3.2)	41.0 (5.0)	45.8 (7.7)	53.8 (12.1)	63.7 (17.6)	68.6 (20.3)	67.9 (19.9)	62.8 (17.1)	54.2 (12.3)	45.5 (7.5)	39.3 (4.1)	51.6 (10.9)
Daily mean °F (°C)	28.9 (−1.7)	27.3 (−2.6)	30.0 (−1.1)	34.5 (1.4)	40.6 (4.8)	49.6 (9.8)	54.9 (12.7)	54.2 (12.3)	51.1 (10.6)	42.9 (6.1)	35.3 (1.8)	29.2 (−1.6)	39.9 (4.4)
Mean daily minimum °F (°C)	18.9 (−7.3)	16.9 (−8.4)	19.0 (−7.2)	23.2 (−4.9)	27.4 (−2.6)	35.6 (2.0)	41.1 (5.1)	40.5 (4.7)	39.3 (4.1)	31.7 (−0.2)	25.2 (−3.8)	19.2 (−7.1)	28.2 (−2.1)
Average precipitation inches (mm)	6.98 (177)	7.11 (181)	4.20 (107)	1.68 (43)	0.68 (17)	0.11 (2.8)	0.72 (18)	1.60 (41)	0.89 (23)	1.60 (41)	2.23 (57)	4.27 (108)	32.07 (815.8)
Average snowfall inches (cm)	25.2 (64)	23.8 (60)	24.5 (62)	8.6 (22)	5.4 (14)	0.0 (0.0)	0.0 (0.0)	0.0 (0.0)	0.0 (0.0)	1.8 (4.6)	13.9 (35)	15.8 (40)	119 (301.6)
Source 1: PRISM Climate Group
Source 2: WRCC (snowfall)

== History ==
The peak is known to the Cahuilla Native Americans as Cahuilla: Táqwish Héki' (or Aya Kaich/I a kitch, meaning "smooth cliffs"). It is regarded as the home of Dakush, the meteor and legendary founder of the Cahuilla.

In 1878, a Wheeler Survey topographical party led by rancher Charles Thomas of Garner Valley climbed the peak. The Wheeler Survey gave the mountain the name "San Jacinto Peak" (rather than "Mt. San Jacinto" or "San Jacinto Mountain.") The earliest recorded ascent of the peak was made in September, 1874 by "F. of Riverside," according to a description of his ascent in the San Diego Union. The first successful ascent of the difficult northeast escarpment was made in 1931 by Floyd Vernoy and Stewart White of Riverside. The peak is flanked by Jean Peak 10,670 feet (3,250 m) and Marion Mountain 10,362 feet (3,158 m). These peaks were named in 1897 by USGS topographer Edmund Taylor Perkins Jr. Perkins named Jean Peak for his sweetheart and future bride, Jean Waters of Plumas County, whom he married in 1903. He named Marion Mountain after Marion Kelly, his girlfriend, a teacher for the Indian Bureau at the Morongo Valley Reservation. According to a local legend, Perkins spent the summer of 1897 deciding which woman to marry while he conducted his topographical survey of San Jacinto Peak and its environs.

Nearby Cornell Peak is named for Cornell University, the alma mater of geologist Robert T. Hill. Perkins and Hill were camping in Round Valley when Hill remarked that the peak looked like the campanile tower at Cornell. Perkins later named the peak Cornell Peak.

In 1931 and 1932, the San Jacinto Mountain Chamber of Commerce sponsored a Labor Day footrace from Idyllwild to San Jacinto Peak and back, a distance of 18 miles (29 km) and a rise of 5,300 feet (1,600 m). The 1931 race was won by Tom Humphreys, a Hopi, in 3:36:30. Humphreys won the race again in 1932 with a time of 3:12. Near the summit of San Jacinto peak is a stone hut that was built in 1935 by the Civilian Conservation Corps under the direction of Serbo-Croatian immigrant Alfred Zarubicka, a stonemason known in Idyllwild as "Zubi."

== Hiking ==
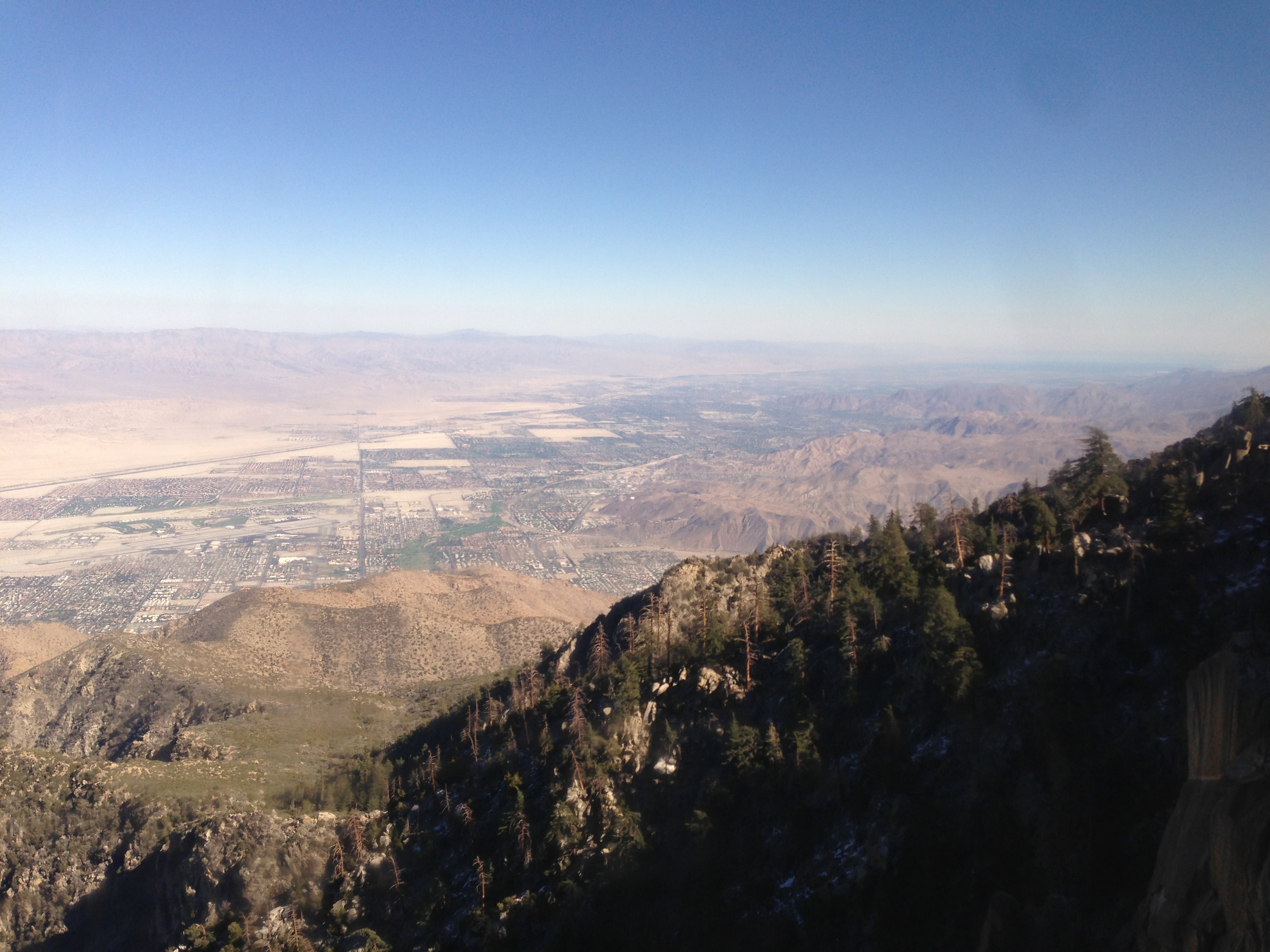
View from Aerial Tramway

San Jacinto Peak is easily accessible, as many trails penetrate the Santa Rosa and San Jacinto Mountains National Monument. The most popular route starts with a ride on the Palm Springs Aerial Tramway from Valley Station at 2,643 feet (806 m) near Palm Springs up to Mountain Station at 8,516 feet (2,596 m). From there, one can easily climb the mountain face via trails. Another route is to hike the Marion Mountain Trail from near the mountain town of Idyllwild. There is a naturally reproducing but introduced population of Sequoiadendrons planted in 1974 located here hundreds of miles from native populations. The Cactus to Clouds Trail involves an arduous climb of approximately 10,700 feet (3,300 m) from the desert floor in Palm Springs to the summit at 10,834 feet (3,302 m). This trail has no water sources until 8,500 feet (2,600 m), so early starts are advised to avoid the temperatures which often soar above 100 °F (38 °C).

== See also ==
- List of California county high points
- List of Ultras of the United States
- Tahquitz (spirit)
