= WTUS-LP =

- Tuscaloosa, Alabama; United States
- Frequency: 103.3 MHz

Programming
- Format: Travel Info

Ownership
- Owner: Tuscaloosa City Board of Education

History
- Call sign meaning: TUScaloosa

Technical information
- Licensing authority: FCC
- Facility ID: 134739
- Class: L1
- ERP: 47 watts
- HAAT: 43.5 meters (156 feet)
- Transmitter coordinates: 33°09′36″N 87°30′54″W

Links
- Public license information: LMS
- Website: https://www.tuscaloosacityschools.com

WTUS-LP (103.3 FM) is a radio station licensed to serve Tuscaloosa, Alabama. The station is owned by the Tuscaloosa City Board of Education. It airs a Travelers' information station format interspersed with smooth jazz.

The station was assigned the WTUS-LP call letters by the Federal Communications Commission on October 19, 2004. WTUS originally shared time on the channel with WUAC-LP. WTUS broadcast from 6:00 AM to 6:00 PM daily, with WUAC broadcasting the other twelve hours of each day. WUAC-LP's license was cancelled by the FCC on December 16, 2014, due to the station having been silent for more than twelve months, which allowed WTUS-LP to commence 24 hour operations.
