= WGEO-LP =

- Georgetown, South Carolina; United States
- Frequency: 105.7 MHz
- Branding: Georgetown Emergency Operations Radio

Programming
- Format: Visitors' information / Emergency alert / Variety

Ownership
- Owner: Georgetown City Fire Department; (City of Georgetown (Georgetown City Fire Department))

History
- Former call signs: WGSC-LP (2002)
- Call sign meaning: Georgetown

Technical information
- Licensing authority: FCC
- Facility ID: 131456
- Class: L1
- ERP: 100 watts
- HAAT: 7.0 meters (23.0 ft)
- Transmitter coordinates: 33°22′5″N 79°17′7″W

Links
- Public license information: LMS
- Website: www.georgetownsc.gov/governmental_services/departments/fire_department/index.php

WGEO-LP (105.7 FM, "Georgetown Emergency Operations Radio") is a low-power radio station licensed to Georgetown, South Carolina, United States. Currently owned by the Georgetown City Fire Department, the station broadcasts emergency messages when necessary, as well as visitors' information for Georgetown-area attractions and music all other times.
