= Hamilton High School (Anza, California) =

Location
- 57430 Mitchell Road; Anza, Riverside County, California 92539; United States; 33°34′14″N 116°39′36″W

Information
- Type: Public
- School district: Hemet Unified School District
- Principal: Kari Sanchez
- Teaching staff: 23.63 (FTE)
- Grades: 9-12
- Enrollment: 372 (2023–2024)
- Student to teacher ratio: 15.74
- Colors: Blue & White
- Athletics conference: CIF - Southern Section; Arrowhead League
- Mascot: Bobcat
- Website: School website

Hamilton High School is a public high school in Anza, California, United States. It became a true 9-12 high school in the school year 2006–2007.

== Evacuation center ==
The school was used as an evacuation center during the Mountain Fire in July 2013. In 2024, it was used as a care and reception center during the Nixon Fire.
