= Three Saints (peaks) =

Three ultra-prominent mountains that surround the Los Angeles Basin

The Three Saints are the three ultra-prominent peaks of Southern California. Each peak lies adjacent to the Los Angeles Basin and reside in close proximity to each other. They are popular destinations for hikers, skiers, and rock climbers.

The peaks are:

- San Gorgonio Mountain – 11,503 feet (3,506 m)
- San Jacinto Peak – 10,834 feet (3,302 m)
- Mount San Antonio – 10,064 feet (3,068 m)

The list is sometimes referred to as the Four Saints due to the inclusion of San Bernardino Peak (10,649 feet (3,246 m)), the initial point of the San Bernardino meridian. San Bernardino Peak (prom. 209 ft) has insignificant topographical prominence compared to the other three mountains, overshadowed by nearby Anderson Peak.
