= Cactus to Clouds Trail =

Hiking route in California, United States

Coordinates: 33°49′31″N 116°33′02″W

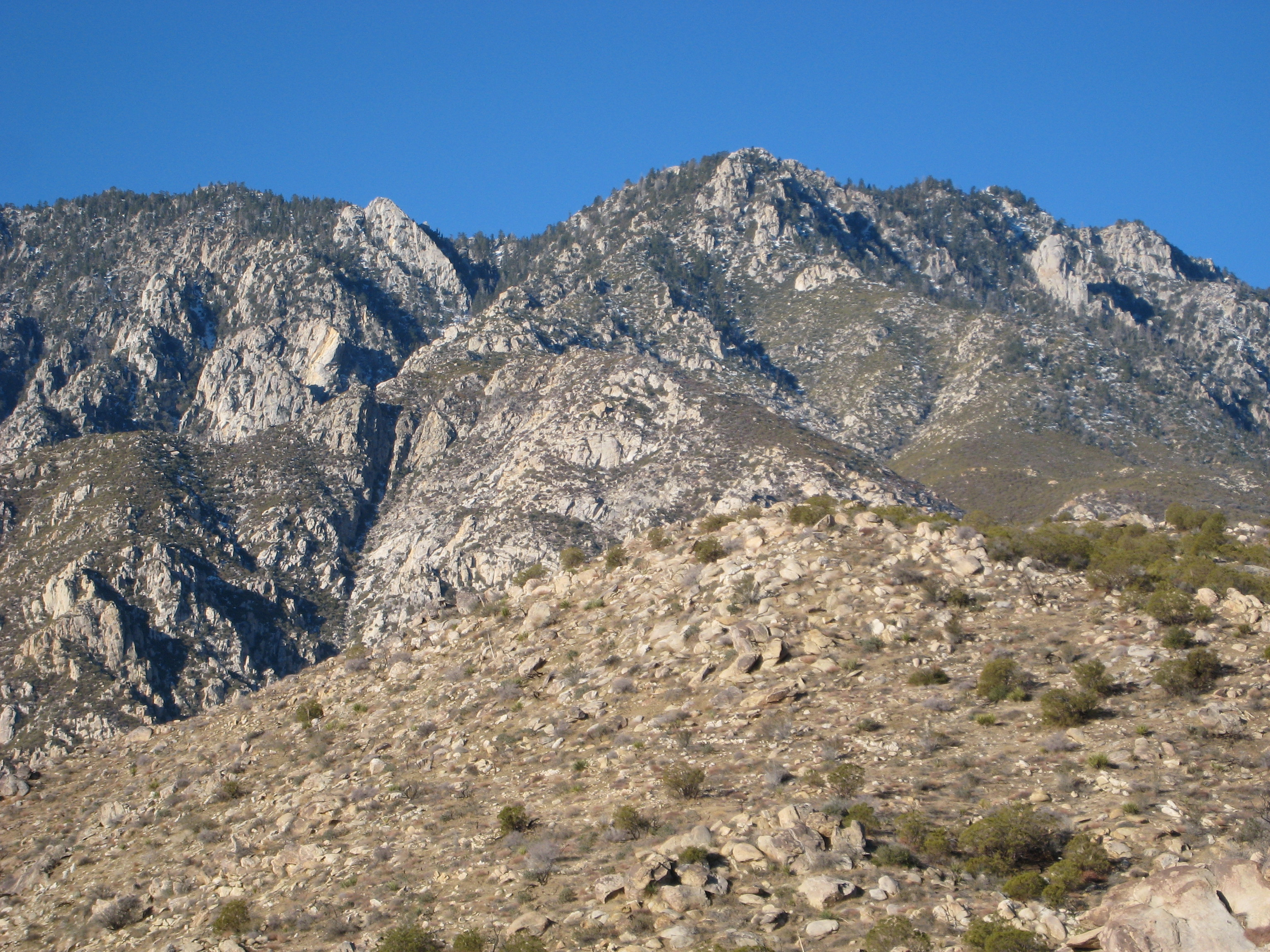
- Upper reaches of the Cactus to Clouds Trail on San Jacinto Peak's east face
- Length: 21 mi (34 km)
- Location: Palm Springs, California
- Trailheads: Palm Springs Art Museum; San Jacinto Peak.
- Use: Hiking, Backpacking
- Elevation change: 10,400 ft (3,200 m)
- Highest point: San Jacinto Peak 10,834 feet (3,302 m)
- Lowest point: Palm Springs Art Museum 520 feet (160 m)
- Difficulty: Class 1-2, highly strenuous

The Cactus to Clouds Trail (C2C) is a hiking route in California. It begins in Palm Springs, California, and ascends to San Jacinto Peak. With a net elevation gain of roughly 10,300 feet (3,100 m), it has one of the greatest elevation increases among day-hike routes in the United States. The elevation gain happens in only 16 miles (26 km), also making it one of the steeper trails of its length in the world. The trail runs roughly parallel to the Palm Springs Aerial Tramway, and the upper part of the trail runs very close to the Mountain station of the tramway.

The initial part of the route is called the Skyline Trail, which climbs 7,900 feet from the desert to Long Valley, in about 11 miles. There, it joins another system of trails, where hikers may gain another 2,400 feet (over 5 miles) to the summit. The route from the desert to the peak and back to the desert is about 32 miles long. A common way to tackle the hike is to walk the way up to the peak from the valley, then head back to the tram station, and then take the tram back down to the valley floor. Separate records are kept for the climb of Skyline Trail (first 11 miles, AKA Cactus to Crowds), for C2C (16 miles one way from the museum to the peak, Cactus to Clouds), and for C2C2C (valley floor to the peak, and back to floor).

A hike up this route typically starts behind the Palm Springs Art Museum. The Skyline Trail starts along a path known as the Museum Trail, continues to a junction with the North Lykken Trail, before becoming an informal trail, not maintained by government agencies. At its end, it joins the Desert View Nature Trail in Mount San Jacinto State Park. The Skyline Trail ends at Long Valley at the end of the Nature Trail. At the end of Skyline, there is a ranger station where it is sometimes possible to obtain potable water. From here, the route continues to a trail junction called Wellman Divide, before reaching the summit of San Jacinto Peak.

There is a nearby cross-country mountaineering route to San Jacinto Peak, called the Snow Creek route. The approach rises even more dramatically than C2C, gaining 11,000 feet in just 7 miles.

== History ==
Ray Wilson and Sue Birnbaum, former Coachella Valley Hiking Club hike leaders conceived the idea for the Cactus to Clouds hike in 1991, after marking, with yellow metal tags, the final miles of the faint Skyline Trail as it terminated at Long Valley near the Palm Springs Aerial Tramway Mountain Station. The following year, starting on the North Lykken Trail, they hiked the Skyline Trail and the San Jacinto Peak Trail to the summit of San Jacinto Peak, a 10,300-foot gain. They decided to offer the hike through the Coachella Valley Hiking Club and subsequently led the first Cactus to Clouds Challenge in 1993, along with 4 other club members.

Roger Keezer, a Coachella Valley Hiking Club hike leader and one of the original Cactus to Clouds Challenge hikers, created the phrase “Cactus to Clouds” when the group was considering names for the event.

== Route ==
The trail begins at around 520 feet (160 m) elevation near the Palm Springs Art Museum. The first part of the trail is maintained by government agencies, and consists of the Museum and North Lykken Trails. After reaching a set of picnic tables 0.8 miles in, the trail turns into an informal path maintained by hikers and volunteers. One may find two rescue boxes along this section. Although the route is generally obvious, there are number of shortcuts and spurs which may confuse hikers and thus pose a danger to the uninitiated.

Continuing out of the hills above Palm Springs, the trail ascends the east side of Mount San Jacinto along a ridge between Chino Canyon and Tahquitz Creek, going roughly westward along the ridgeline. There is a short northward turn at 7,500 feet (2,300 m), a difficult part for winter ascents known as "The Traverse". In Long Valley, hikers usually take a break at the tramway facilities at 8,400 feet (2,600 m). Many descend via the tramway at this point.

The remainder of the route follows a well-maintained state park trail to the summit of San Jacinto Peak, passing a popular trail junction known as Wellman Divide along the way. From the peak, the vast majority of hikers walk down to the tram station and take the tram down. A small minority of C2C hikers walk all the way back down to the Museum.

== Hazards ==
The primary hazard of Cactus to Clouds is the weather, in particular, the extreme variance between the desert start and the subalpine end. Temperatures in the lower portions of the trail can reach up to 120 °F (49 °C), while temperatures of −12 °F (−24 °C) are not uncommon at the summit of Mount San Jacinto in the winter. For these reasons, the hike usually begins in Palm Springs very early in the morning, as early as midnight. The hike is typically done in Fall or Spring, with May and October being the best months.
