= La Sierra Academy =

Location
- 4900 Golden Avenue; Riverside, California 92505; United States; 33°55′06″N 117°29′43″W

Information
- Type: Private/Parochial
- Motto: Learning, Serving & Achieving Through Christ
- Religious affiliation: Seventh-day Adventist
- Principal: Elizabeth Muñoz Beard (TK–12)
- Teaching staff: 40
- Grades: TK-12
- Gender: Co-educational
- Enrollment: 819 (2008)
- Student to teacher ratio: 20
- Colors: Blue and Gold
- Athletics conference: CIF - Southern Section; Arrowhead League
- Sports: Girls Volleyball, Girls Basketball, Girls Softball, Coed Soccer, Coed Track and Field, Boys Basketball, Boys Baseball, Boys Volleyball
- Mascot: Knights
- Accreditation: Western Association of Schools and Colleges Commission on Accreditation, North American Division of Seventh-day Adventists
- Website: http://lsak12.com/

La Sierra Academy (LSA) is a private, co-educational, transitional kindergarten–12th grade Christian school in Riverside, California. LSA is a part of the Seventh-day Adventist education system, the world's second largest Christian school system.

== History ==
La Sierra Academy was founded in the fall of 1922 as a secondary school. The land on which it was founded was formerly part of the 1846 Mexican land grant, Rancho La Sierra. La Sierra Academy's first school bulletin from 1922 stated that its students would "learn to render effective service." The school grew into a junior college and later into a full four year liberal arts college. This shift created a need to separate the academy into other academic levels. Thus in 1940, La Sierra College Preparatory School, now known as La Sierra University, was established. In 1955 the school moved to its current location along Pierce Street and Golden Avenue less than a mile away from the university.

== Incidents ==
On March 4, 2020, counselor Matthew Johnson was arrested for creation, possession, and distribution of child pornography. He was accused of secretly videotaping inside a boys' restroom on campus. Three alleged victims have sued La Sierra Academy for continued employment of Johnson despite his previous alleged inappropriate conducts with children. Victims' attorney Morgan Stewart stated that La Sierra Academy has "failed in their most basic moral responsibility to protect vulnerable children from a serial sexual predator."

== See also ==
- List of Seventh-day Adventist secondary schools
- Seventh-day Adventist education
