= Sage, California =

Unincorporated community in California, United States

- Unincorporated community Census-designated place
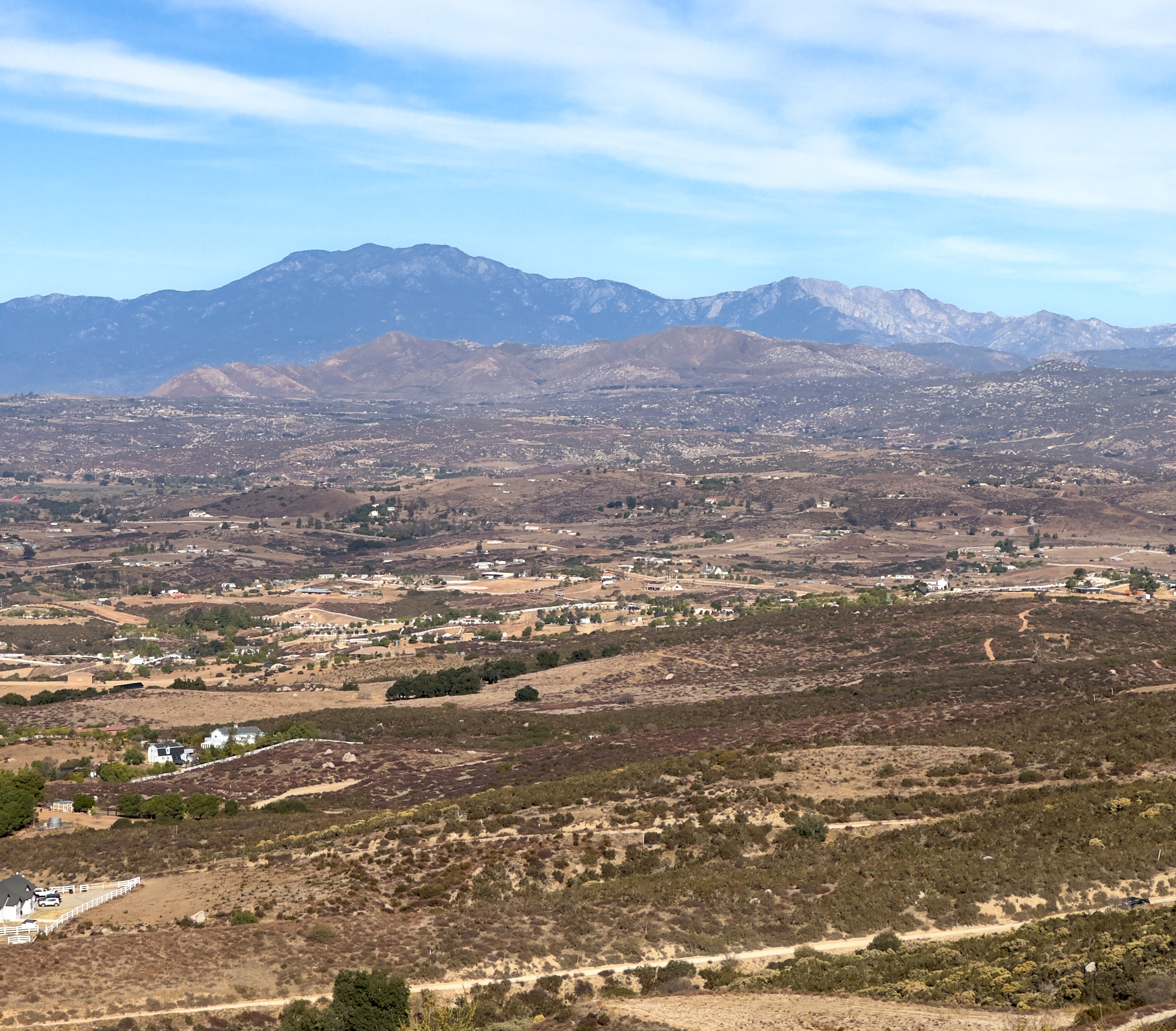
- Sage, California with Red Mountain, San Jacinto Mountains in background

- Location within California Location within the United States
- Coordinates: 33°34′54″N 116°55′56″W
- Country: United States
- State: California
- County: Riverside

Area
  - Total: 68.27 sq mi (176.81 km^{2})
  - Land: 68.26 sq mi (176.79 km^{2})
  - Water: 0.0077 sq mi (0.02 km^{2})
- Elevation: 2,313 ft (705 m)

Population (2020)
  - Total: 3,370
  - Density: 49.4/sq mi (19.06/km^{2})
- Time zone: UTC-8 (Pacific (PST))
  - Summer (DST): UTC-7 (PDT)
- Area code: 951
- GNIS feature ID: 1661354

Sage is an unincorporated community and census-designated place (CDP) in Riverside County, California, United States. It has a population of 3,370 according to the 2020 census. Its elevation is 2,313 feet (705 m).

== Demographics ==
Historical population
Census	Pop.	Note	%±
2020	3,370		—
U.S. Decennial Census; 1860–1870 1880-1890; 1900 1910 1920; 1930 1940 1950; 1960 1970 1980; 1990 2000 2010

Sage first appeared as a census designated place in the 2020 U.S. census.

=== 2020 census ===
As of the 2020 census, Sage had a population of 3,370. The median age was 45.5 years. 20.2% of residents were under the age of 18 and 20.5% of residents were 65 years of age or older. For every 100 females there were 106.0 males, and for every 100 females age 18 and over there were 107.0 males age 18 and over.

0.0% of residents lived in urban areas, while 100.0% lived in rural areas.

There were 1,141 households in Sage, of which 26.6% had children under the age of 18 living in them. Of all households, 57.1% were married-couple households, 18.3% were households with a male householder and no spouse or partner present, and 19.3% were households with a female householder and no spouse or partner present. About 21.1% of all households were made up of individuals and 11.6% had someone living alone who was 65 years of age or older.

There were 1,331 housing units, of which 14.3% were vacant. The homeowner vacancy rate was 2.8% and the rental vacancy rate was 9.5%.

=== Racial and ethnic composition ===
Sage CDP, California – Racial and ethnic composition Note: the US Census treats Hispanic/Latino as an ethnic category. This table excludes Latinos from the racial categories and assigns them to a separate category. Hispanics/Latinos may be of any race.
Race / Ethnicity (NH = Non-Hispanic)	Pop 2020	% 2020
White alone (NH)	2,079	61.69%
Black or African American alone (NH)	55	1.63%
Native American or Alaska Native alone (NH)	25	0.74%
Asian alone (NH)	82	2.43%
Native Hawaiian or Pacific Islander alone (NH)	1	0.03%
Other race alone (NH)	12	0.36%
Mixed race or Multiracial (NH)	133	3.95%
Hispanic or Latino (any race)	983	29.17%
Total	3,370	100.00%

== Education ==
The majority of the CDP is in the Hemet Unified School District. A small portion is in the Temecula Valley Unified School District.
