= Arrowhead League =

The Arrowhead League is a high school athletic league that is part of the CIF Southern Section. Its member schools are located around Riverside, California, and include five independent schools, one public school, and the United States Bureau of Indian Education operated Sherman Indian High School.

== Members ==
- California Lutheran Academy
- California School for the Deaf, Riverside
- Hamilton High School
- La Sierra Academy
- Sherman Indian High School
- United Christian Academy

== Football-only members ==
- Riverside Preparatory School
