= Travelers' information station =

US DOT-licensed radio station

A travelers' information station (TIS), also called highway advisory radio (HAR) by the United States Department of Transportation, is a licensed low-powered non-commercial radio station, used to broadcast information to the general public, including for motorists regarding travel, destinations of interest, and situations of imminent danger and emergencies. They are commonly operated by transportation departments, national and local parks departments and historic sites, airport authorities, local governments, federal agencies, colleges and universities, hospitals and health agencies, and special events and destinations.

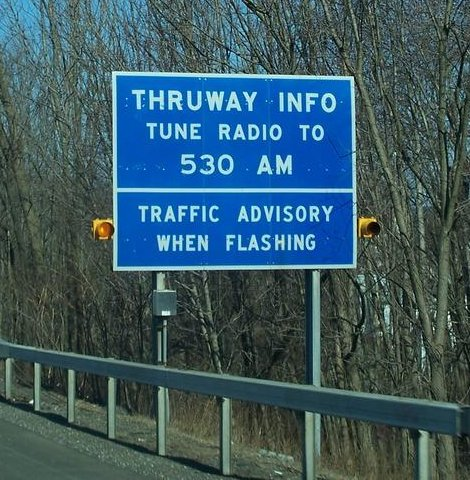
TIS notification sign in the United States

== United States ==
=== Current regulations and applications ===
In the United States, most Travelers Information Stations (TIS) are licensed by the Federal Communications Commission (FCC), although stations operated by U.S. national parks and others under U.S. federal government jurisdiction are licensed by the National Telecommunications and Information Administration (NTIA). Programming normally consists of continuously repeated pre-recorded messages. Permissible station content is defined by the FCC as:

... only noncommercial voice information pertaining to traffic and road conditions, traffic hazard and travel advisories, directions, availability of lodging, rest stops and service stations, and descriptions of local points of interest. It is not permissible to identify the commercial name of any business whose service may be available within or outside the coverage area of a Travelers' Information Station. However, to facilitate announcements concerning departures/arrivals and parking areas at air, train, and bus terminals, the trade name identification of carriers is permitted. Travelers' Information Stations may also transmit information in accordance with the [safety and emergency communication] provisions of §§90.405 and 90.407.

Most TIS/HAR licenses in the U.S are held by governmental entities, in addition to quasi-governmental agencies and authorities as well as health and emergency service providers working in conjunction with the government. Stations may be licensed to operate on any AM band frequency from 530–1700 kHz. (In a single case—WQFG689, licensed to the County of Hudson, New Jersey—a station has been authorized to transmit on 1710 kHz. 1710 kHz is also in use by a number of federally licensed stations.)

Example Installations

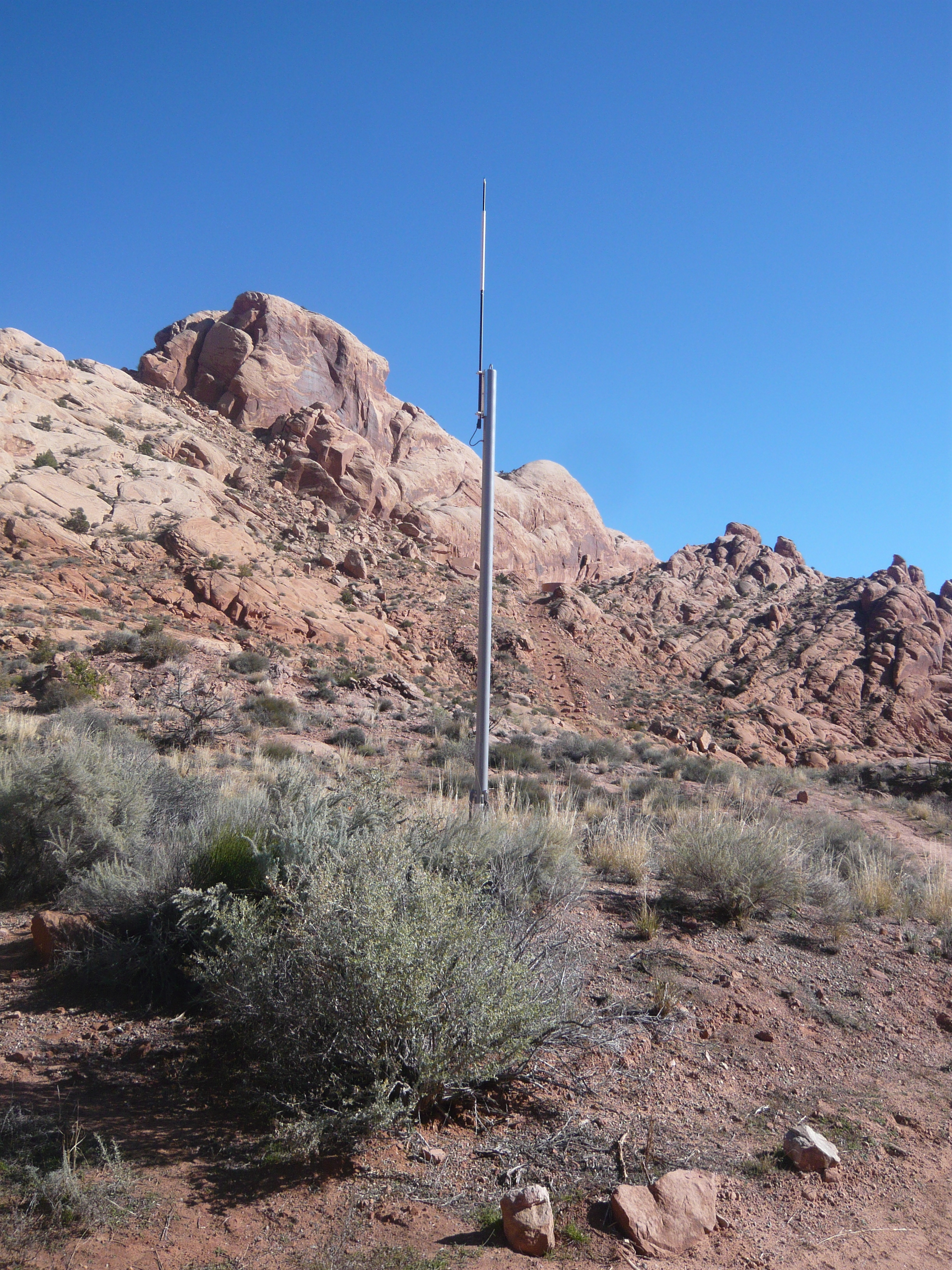
TIS Station at Arches National Park in Utah was installed near the park entrance by Information Station Specialists' technicians in November, 2015.

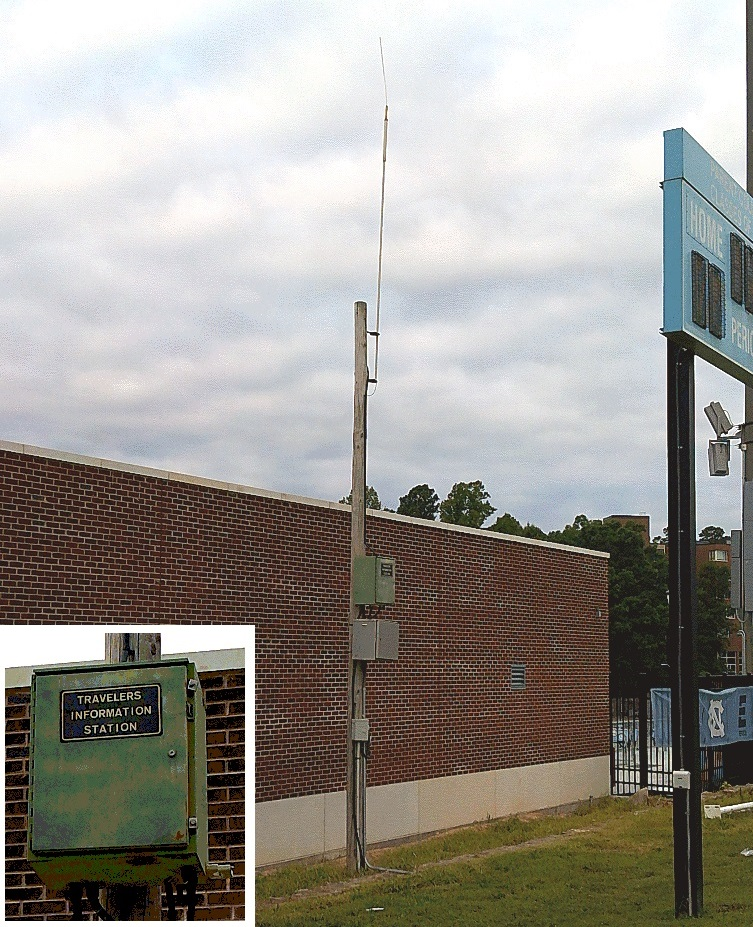
TIS transmitter with vertical antenna mounted on a telephone pole at the University of North Carolina at Chapel Hill (2019)

A majority of TIS stations operate on 530 kHz, which is reserved exclusively for use by this service, and on the AM expanded band frequencies of 1610–1700 kHz, which is the least congested portion of the AM broadcast band. On 1610 kHz, TIS service stations have a co-priority status with broadcasting stations, while on the remaining standard AM broadcasting frequencies, 540 kHz-1600 kHz and 1620–1700 kHz, TIS stations are considered a secondary service, with priority held by standard broadcasting station assignments.

Although initially envisioned as providing general information to motorists and travelers, TIS stations have also been developed for supporting emergency public safety communication, and the FCC currently licenses the stations through its Public Safety and Homeland Security Bureau (PSHSB). During a crisis, mobile phone networks are often overloaded, and TIS stations can be used to broadcast emergency instructions. Also, during a widespread electrical outage stations equipped with reserve battery or generator power can continue operating, for reception by battery-operated radios. In 2008, the American Association of Information Radio Operators (AAIRO) was formed to represent station operators, and at the time of its formation the group emphasized the ability of TIS stations to broadcast live local updates to affected communities during emergencies.

Two forms of transmitting antennas are employed. Most commonly used are standard non-directional vertical antennas. However, an alternate implementation, called "leaky cable", is a form of carrier current transmission, which employs long horizontal conductors, commonly run alongside roadways. Stations using a standard antenna are generally limited to a coverage radius of 1.9 km (1.2 mi), with an antenna height of no more than 15 m (49 ft), and a maximum power of 10 watts, although special events and critical evacuation systems, such as those in the Florida Keys and near chemical and nuclear facilities, have been granted waivers to exceed that limit, typically for up to 100 watts.

Individual "leaky cable" installations are limited to a length of 1.9 km (1.2 mi), although "ribbon systems" consisting of installations sequentially located along a travel route are permitted. Because cable installations are less effective radiators, they are permitted to use up to 50 watts order to achieve a maximum of 2 mV/m at 60 m (200 ft) from the cable.

In order to limit potential interference to stations operating on adjacent frequencies, TIS transmitters are required to employ a low-pass filter to reduce the transmission of audio frequencies higher than 5 kHz.

=== TIS service history ===
The TIS service was first authorized by the FCC in 1977 following two years of study. At this time, the standard AM broadcast band ran from 540 kHz to 1600 kHz, and the new TIS service was initially assigned exclusive use of the two adjoining frequencies of 530 kHz and 1610 kHz. However, on June 8, 1988, an International Telecommunication Union conference held at Rio de Janeiro, Brazil, adopted provisions, effective July 1, 1990, to extend the upper end of the AM broadcast band in the Americas, by adding 10 frequencies which spanned from 1610 kHz to 1700 kHz.

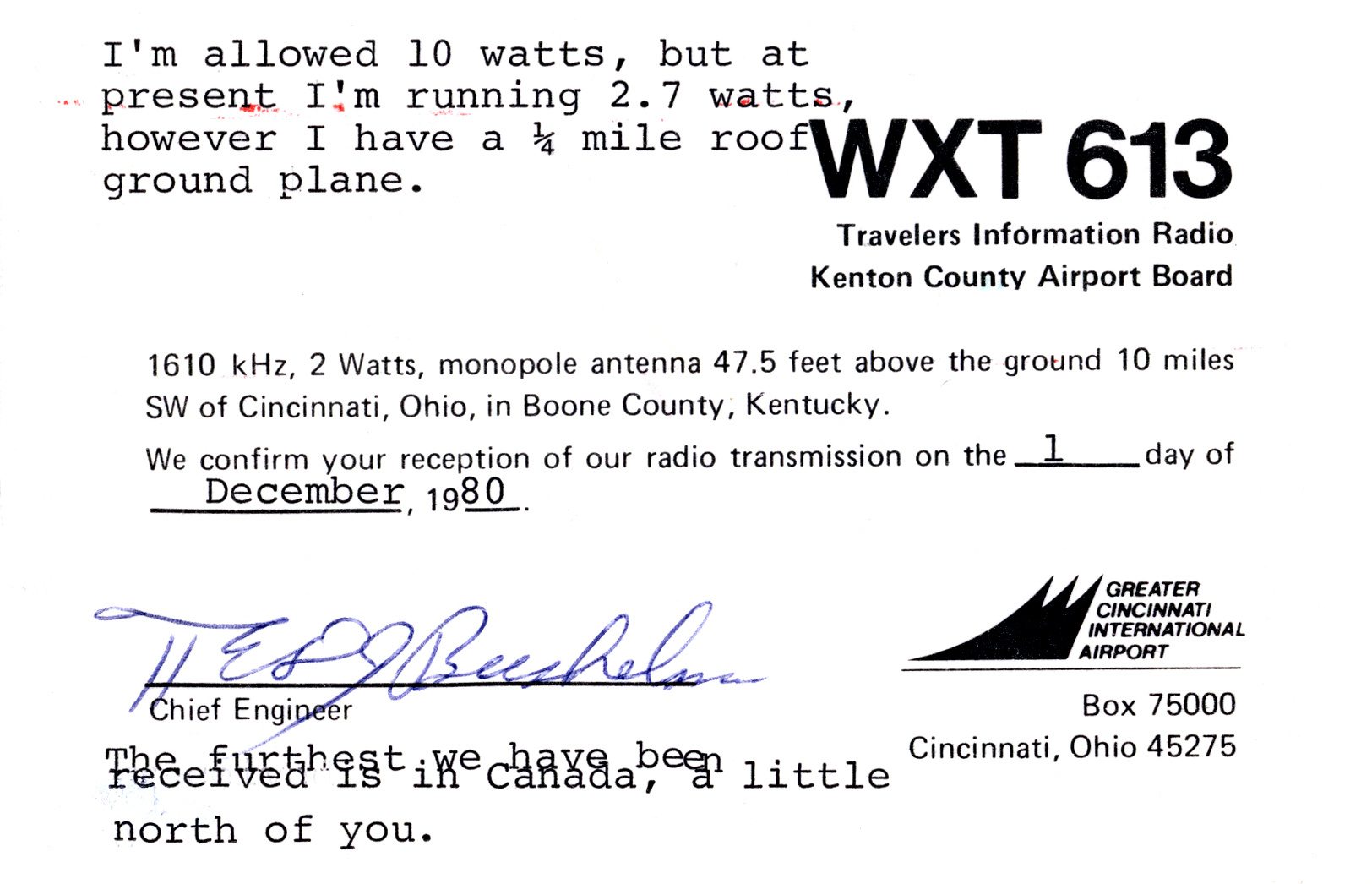
1980 QSL card confirming reception of TIS WXT613 located at the Cincinnati Airport

By this time, 1610 kHz had been assigned for use by hundreds of Travelers Information Stations in the United States. Moreover, the licensing authority was shared between the FCC and the National Telecommunications and Information Administration (NTIA), so coordination between these two agencies was required. It was concluded that, for operation on 1610 kHz, TIS and broadcasting stations were considered "co-primary" services, thus existing TIS stations were protected from having to move to new frequencies. (This has effectively made it impossible to assign any standard broadcasting stations to 1610 kHz in the United States.) It was also informally suggested that, once most radios could tune to the higher frequencies, all of the TIS stations on 1610 kHz could be moved as a group to 1710 kHz, however this was never implemented.

On July 18, 2013, in response to petitions submitted from Highway Information Systems, Inc. (HIS), the American Association of Information Radio Operators (AAIRO), and the American Association of State Highway and Transportation Officials (AASHTO), the FCC adopted Report and Order 13-98 updating and clarifying the regulations applying to TIS stations. The Report and Order, as summarized by a May 2014 Compliance Guide (DA-14-651), approved the establishment of "ribbons" of sequentially located roadside transmitters so long as content remained pertinent at all points. This also clarified that programming content must relate to travel, emergencies or situations of imminent danger to the public, and that it is at the discretion of station operators, based on their knowledge of the area and its population, of what situations present an imminent danger.

A subsequent Rule Making procedure, instituted at the request of the AAIRO, resulted in the loosening of the audio frequency limit from 3 kHz to 5 kHz, after it was determined that the improved frequency response would increase intelligibility without increasing interference to stations operating on adjacent frequencies. Although the original proposal suggested completely eliminating the filtering, the 5 kHz standard was adopted as a compromise after the National Association of Broadcasters noted that "full-power AM radio stations routinely use 5 kHz filters to address and prevent interference among AM stations, with few significant problems".

=== Low-power FM stations ===
In 2000, the FCC began authorizing non-commercial Low Power FM (LPFM) stations, which are not formally a part of the TIS/HAR service, although in a few cases stations have been adapted to serve a similar function. LPFM stations operate with up to 100 watts and generally have somewhat larger service areas than TIS stations on the AM band, and also avoid the increased nighttime interference from distant stations which affects AM band stations. However, in contrast to the TIS service, there are only limited "filing window" periods to apply for permission to build an LPFM station, and these stations are required to produce up to 8 hours of new programming each day, and also in certain instances to share airtime with other licensees.

LPFM examples include WTUS-LP in Tuscaloosa, Alabama, originally operated by the Tuscaloosa Tourism and Sports Commission before being transferred in 2016 to the Tuscaloosa City Board of Education, and WGEO-LP in Georgetown, South Carolina, which is operated by the Georgetown City Fire Department. State and local governments may also create state-wide networks to provide non-commercial public safety information via radio using LPFM stations. Colorado has a statewide network of LPFMs used in this manner, while many other state, county, or local governments use one or more stations.

== Europe ==
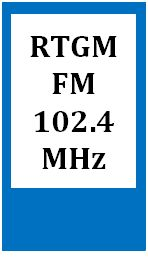
The old European road sign about radio traffic-information frequency for radio station Gornji Milanovac (Serbia).

In France, information is provided on 107.7 MHz FM along selected autoroutes. In Italy, most highways are covered by RAI's Isoradio network, broadcasting in most areas on 103.3 MHz. In Germany and the former Yugoslavia, highways and motorways are provided with traffic information by radio, although the original systems have been largely replaced.

Newer RDS-based systems interrupt a station's regular programming to give travelers current information about the highway, updated traffic and weather reports, public service announcements by various governmental and public organizations, railway information and news bulletins. These radio systems are most commonly used in Slovenia, Croatia and partly in Serbia. Highways served with traffic radio information include:

- European route E61: Villach–Kranj–Ljubljana
- European route E70: Ljubljana–Zagreb–Sisak–Slavonski Brod–Belgrade.

== Japan ==
In Japan Highway Radio broadcasts on 1620 and 1629 kHz AM along stretches of major expressways.

== Canada ==
TIS stations operate in Canada (on both AM and FM bands).

== Brazil ==
TIS stations in Brazil are known as Radiovias or Rádio-estradas. Currently, Brazil has only one TIS station in operation, called CCR FM. The radio station operates on low-power antennas along Presidente Dutra Highway, between São Paulo and Rio de Janeiro, on 107.5 MHz, and airs information about traffic and news. Between 2004 and 2018, Radiovia Freeway FM, a TIS station operated on 88.3 MHz, was also on the air along the BR-290, between Porto Alegre and the northern coast of Rio Grande do Sul.

The service of TIS stations is not provided for by the Brazilian broadcasting law, however, Folha de S. Paulo has reported in July 2019 that the Brazilian Ministry of Communications wants to include in its agenda the regularization of TIS stations. In May 2021, the Brazilian government launched the project to implement TIS stations on the country's federal highways, authorizing concessionaires to operate radio stations with coverage on the roads. These stations were exempt from the A Voz do Brazil airing requirements.

== Australia ==
In some areas of Australia stations operate on 87.6–88 MHz FM.

== Nigeria ==
TIS stations operate in some areas of Nigeria.

== See also ==
- Tourist information
- Traffic reporting
- Traffic message channel
- WNKI578: Idyllwild, California emergency public safety station.
