= Hemet Unified School District =

Public school district in Riverside County, California

Address
- 1791 West Acacia Avenue Hemet, California; United States

District information
- Type: Public
- Grades: K–12
- Superintendent: Christi Barrett
- Schools: 28

Students and staff
- Students: 21,573 (2020–2021)
- Teachers: 956.34 (FTE)
- Staff: 1,686.67 (FTE)
- Student–teacher ratio: 22.56:1

Other information
- Website: www.hemetusd.org

Hemet Unified School District is a school district in Hemet, California which covers; Hemet, East Hemet, Valle Vista, Anza, Winchester, and Idyllwild . Christi Barrett is the district's Superintendent, having succeeded Dr. Barry L. Kayrell, EdD in June 2016. Stacey Bailey is the president of the Board of Education.

== Boundary ==
The district includes most of Hemet, the census-designated places of Aguanga, Anza, East Hemet, Lake Riverside, Mountain Center, Valle Vista, and Winchester, almost all of Idyllwild-Pine Cove CDP, most of Sage CDP, and portions of San Jacinto and most of Green Acres CDP.

== Schools ==
=== Preschools ===
- Hemet Preschool

=== Elementary schools ===
1. Bautista Creek Elementary School
2. Cawston Elementary School
3. Cottonwood School(K-8)
4. Fruitvale Elementary School*
5. Hamilton School(K-6)
6. Harmony Elementary School
7. Hemet Elementary School
8. Idyllwild School (K-8)
9. Jacob Wiens Elementary School
10. Little Lake Elementary School*
11. McSweeny Elementary School
12. Pleasant Elementary School
13. lRamona Elementary School
14. Valle Vista Elementary School
15. Whittier Elementary School
16. Winchester Elementary School
17. Hemet Dual Language Academy

=== Middle schools ===
1. Acacia Middle School*
2. Cottonwood (K-8) School*
3. Dartmouth Middle School*
4. Diamond Valley Middle School
5. Hamilton Middle School (Secondary Campus)
6. Idyllwild*
7. Rancho Viejo Middle School
8. Western Center Academy*

=== High schools ===
1. Hemet Senior High School*
2. West Valley High School
3. Hamilton High School
4. Tahquitz High School
5. Western Center Academy*
6. Alessandro High School*

=== K-12 Schools ===
1. The Academy of Innovation*

=== Adult Education ===
1. Hemet Adult School*
