= Mountain Fire =

Mountain Fire may refer to:

- Mountain Fire (2013) in Riverside County, California
- Mountain Fire (2019) in Shasta County, California
- Mountain Fire (2024) in Ventura County, California
