= California State Route 243 =

Highway in California

State Route 243
- Banning-Idyllwild Panoramic Highway
- SR 243 highlighted in red

Route information
- Maintained by Caltrans
- Length: 29.625 mi (47.677 km)
- Tourist routes: Banning-Idyllwild Panoramic Highway

Major junctions
- South end: SR 74 in Mountain Center
- North end: I-10 in Banning

Location
- Country: United States
- State: California
- County: Riverside

Highway system
- State highways in California; Interstate; US; State; Scenic; History; Pre‑1964; Unconstructed; Deleted; Freeways
← SR 242	→ SR 244

State Route 243 (SR 243) is a 30-mile (48-kilometer) two-lane state highway in Riverside County, California, that runs from SR 74 in Mountain Center to Interstate 10 (I-10) in Banning. Known as the Banning-Idyllwild Panoramic Highway, it also provides access to Idyllwild and the San Bernardino National Forest. The road from Banning to Idyllwild originally opened by 1910, and was added to the state highway system in 1970. The highway was later also designated as the Esperanza Firefighters Memorial Highway in honor of firefighters who died while fighting the 2006 Esperanza Fire.

== Route description ==
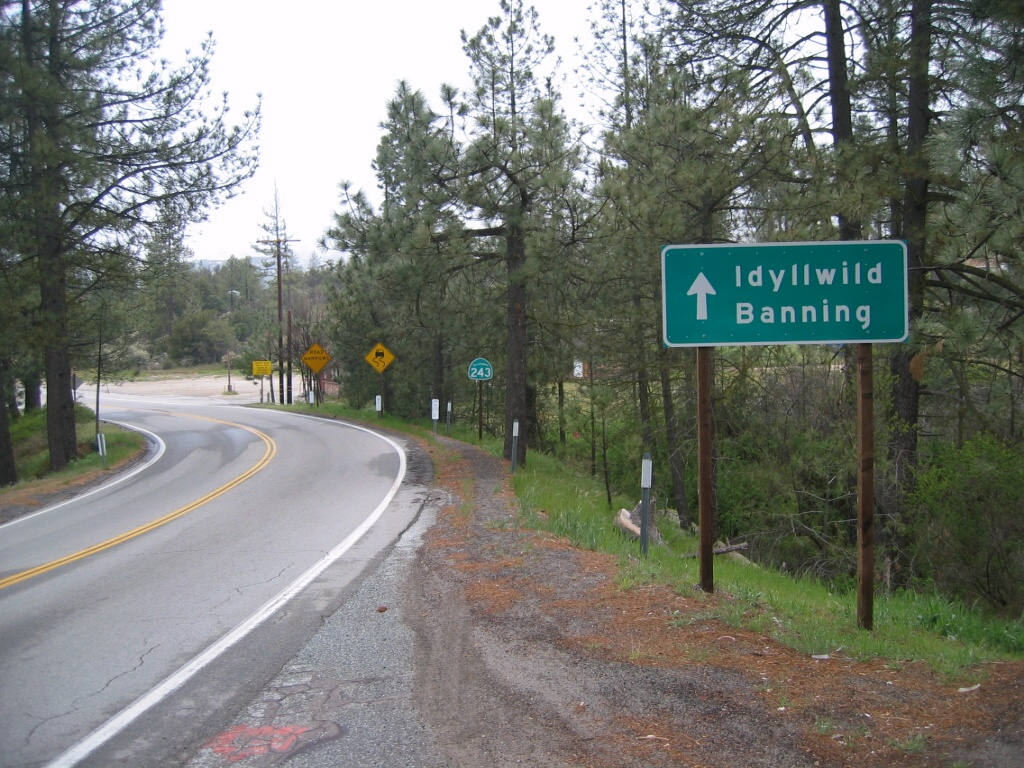
Southern end of Highway 243, looking north

Route 243 is defined in section 543 of the California Streets and Highways Code, and that the highway is "from Route 74 near Mountain Center to Route 10 near Banning".

SR 243 begins at SR 74 in the San Jacinto Wilderness near Mountain Center, Riverside County as Idyllwild Road. The highway traverses north along a winding road through the community of Idyllwild. SR 243 makes a left turn at the intersection with Circle Drive and continues through Pine Cove. The road continues through the forest past Mount San Jacinto State Park through Twin Pines and the Morongo Indian Reservation before making a few switchbacks and descending en route to the city of Banning as the Banning Idyllwild Panoramic Highway. The highway continues as San Gorgonio Avenue into the city before making a left onto Lincoln Street and a right onto 8th Street and terminating at a diamond interchange with I-10.

Except for a portion in Banning SR 243 is not part of the National Highway System, a network of highways that are considered essential to the country's economy, defense, and mobility by the Federal Highway Administration. SR 243 is eligible for the State Scenic Highway System, and is officially designated as a scenic highway by the California Department of Transportation (Caltrans), meaning that it is a substantial section of highway passing through a "memorable landscape" with no "visual intrusions", where the potential designation has gained popular favor with the community. In 2007, it was named the Esperanza Firefighters Memorial Highway in honor of five firefighters who died while fighting the Esperanza Fire in October 2006. In 2013, SR 243 had an annual average daily traffic (AADT) of 1,650 between Marion Ridge Drive in Idyllwild and San Gorgonio Avenue in Banning, and 6,500 at the northern terminus in Banning, the latter of which was the highest AADT for the highway.

== History ==
A road from Banning to Idyllwild was under construction in 1904, and 12 miles (19 km) of the road was open by August, with an additional six miles (9.7 km) of the road planned. Another four miles (6.4 km) were commissioned in 1908. The oiled road was completed by September 1910, and provided a view of Lake Elsinore and the Colorado Desert, and it was expected to help with transporting lumber and stopping fires; because of this, the federal government provided $2,000 for the construction. The road became a part of the forest highway system in 1927.

A new "high-gear" road from Banning to Idyllwild was under way by 1935, and two years later, the Los Angeles Times considered the road to be "high-gear". Efforts to pave the road were under way in 1950. The road from Banning through Idyllwild to SR 74 was known as County Route R1 (CR R1) by 1966. By 1969, plans were in place to add the Banning to Idyllwild to Mountain Center road as a state highway; earlier, State Senator Nelson S. Dilworth proposed legislation to require the road to be added to the state highway system if SR 195 was removed, as the two were of roughly the same length, but the latter remained in the system. SR 243 was added to the state highway system in 1970. The Division of Highways suggested deleting the highway in 1971. In 1998, Caltrans had no plans to improve the route through 2015.

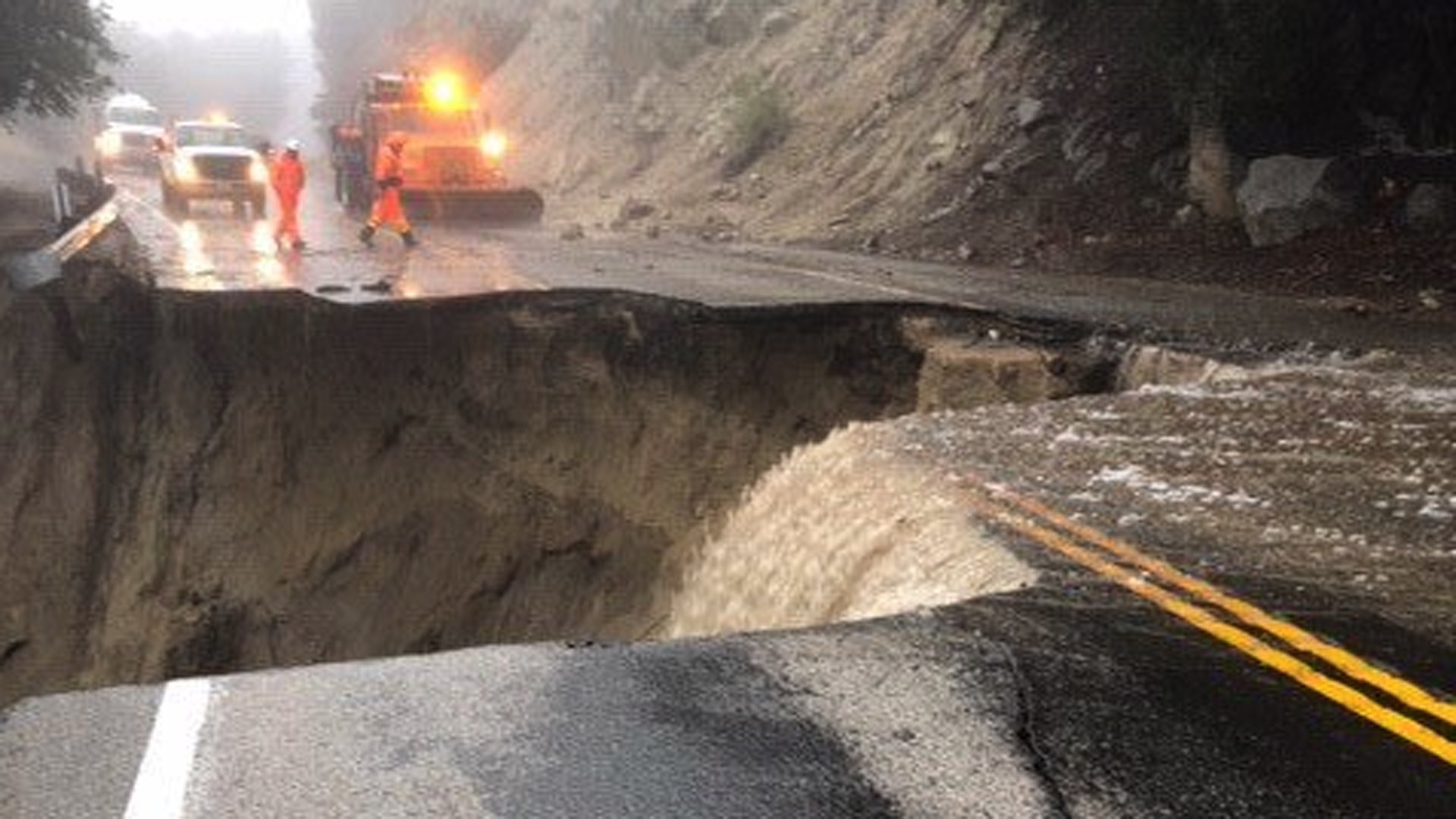
Damage to SR 243 on February 14, 2019

On February 14, 2019, heavy rain caused severe damage to the highway, causing it to close for several months. It has since reopened.

== Major intersections ==
Except where prefixed with a letter, postmiles were measured on the road as it was when the route was established, based on the alignment that existed at the time, and do not necessarily reflect current mileage. Postmile prefixes include: R reflecting a realignment in the route since then, M indicating a second realignment, L referring to an overlap due to a correction or change, and T indicating postmiles classified as temporary. Segments that remain unconstructed or have been relinquished to local control may be omitted. The entire route is in Riverside County.

Location	Postmile	Destinations	Notes
Mountain Center	0.00	SR 74 – Lake Hemet, Palm Desert, Hemet	South end of SR 243
Banning	29.66	I-10 – Los Angeles, Indio	Interchange; north end of SR 243; I-10 exit 100
Banning	29.66	8th Street	Continuation beyond I-10
1.000 mi = 1.609 km; 1.000 km = 0.621 mi
