= East Hemet, California =

- census-designated place
- Interactive map of East Hemet, California
- Location in the United States
- Coordinates: 33°44′10″N 116°56′25″W
- Country: United States
- State: California
- County: Riverside

Area
  - Total: 5.19 sq mi (13.45 km^{2})
  - Land: 5.19 sq mi (13.45 km^{2})
  - Water: 0 sq mi (0.00 km^{2}) 0%
- Elevation: 1,690 ft (515 m)

Population (2020)
  - Total: 19,432
  - Density: 3,740.6/sq mi (1,444.27/km^{2})
- Time zone: UTC-8 (PST)
  - Summer (DST): UTC-7 (PDT)
- ZIP code: 92544
- Area code: 951
- FIPS code: 06-20697
- GNIS feature ID: 1867016

East Hemet is a census-designated place (CDP) in Riverside County, California, United States, located east of Hemet. East Hemet is in an unincorporated area outside the city limits of Hemet. The population was 19,432 at the 2020 census, up from 17,418 at the 2010 census.

== Geography ==
East Hemet is located at 33°44′10″N 116°56′25″W (33.736120, -116.940305).

According to the United States Census Bureau, the CDP has a total area of 5.2 square miles (13 km^{2}), all of it land.

== Demographics ==
Historical population
Census	Pop.	Note	%±
1960	1,936		—
1970	8,598		344.1%
1980	14,712		71.1%
1990	17,611		19.7%
2000	14,823		−15.8%
2010	17,418		17.5%
2020	19,432		11.6%
U.S. Decennial Census; 1860–1870 1880-1890; 1900 1910 1920; 1930 1940 1950; 1960 1970 1980; 1990 2000 2010

The community first appeared as an unincorporated place under the name Hemet East in the 1960 U.S. census and 1970 U.S. census; and listed as a census designated place under the name East Hemet in the 1980 U.S. census.

=== Racial and ethnic composition ===
East Hemet CDP, California – Racial and ethnic composition Note: the US Census treats Hispanic/Latino as an ethnic category. This table excludes Latinos from the racial categories and assigns them to a separate category. Hispanics/Latinos may be of any race.
Race / Ethnicity (NH = Non-Hispanic)	Pop 2000	Pop 2010	Pop 2020	% 2000	% 2010	% 2020
White alone (NH)	10,359	9,232	6,860	69.88%	53.00%	35.30%
Black or African American alone (NH)	202	609	1,023	1.36%	3.50%	5.26%
Native American or Alaska Native alone (NH)	132	177	164	0.89%	1.02%	0.84%
Asian alone (NH)	150	262	353	1.01%	1.50%	1.82%
Native Hawaiian or Pacific Islander alone (NH)	12	26	35	0.08%	0.15%	0.18%
Other race alone (NH)	9	7	66	0.06%	0.04%	0.34%
Mixed race or Multiracial (NH)	267	327	699	1.80%	1.88%	3.60%
Hispanic or Latino (any race)	3,692	6,778	10,232	24.91%	38.91%	52.66%
Total	14,823	17,418	19,432	100.00%	100.00%	100.00%

=== 2020 census ===
As of the 2020 census, East Hemet had a population of 19,432 and a population density of 3,740.5 inhabitants per square mile (1,444.2/km^{2}). 98.2% of residents lived in urban areas, while 1.8% lived in rural areas. The census reported that 99.5% of the population lived in households, 0.2% lived in non-institutionalized group quarters, and 0.3% were institutionalized.

There were 5,622 households, of which 43.5% had children under the age of 18 living in them. Of all households, 50.6% were married-couple households, 8.6% were cohabiting couple households, 24.9% were households with a female householder and no spouse or partner present, and 15.9% were households with a male householder and no spouse or partner present. About 14.0% of all households were made up of individuals and 5.8% had someone living alone who was 65 years of age or older. The average household size was 3.44. There were 4,521 families (80.4% of all households).

The age distribution was 28.7% under the age of 18, 9.4% aged 18 to 24, 27.0% aged 25 to 44, 22.8% aged 45 to 64, and 12.1% who were 65 years of age or older. The median age was 33.3 years. For every 100 females, there were 97.3 males, and for every 100 females age 18 and over there were 94.6 males.

There were 5,852 housing units at an average density of 1,126.5/sq mi (434.9/km^{2}), of which 3.9% were vacant. Of the 5,622 occupied units, 65.4% were owner-occupied and 34.6% were renter-occupied; the homeowner vacancy rate was 1.4% and the rental vacancy rate was 4.3%.

Racial composition as of the 2020 census
Race	Number	Percent
White	8,887	45.7%
Black or African American	1,139	5.9%
American Indian and Alaska Native	506	2.6%
Asian	388	2.0%
Native Hawaiian and Other Pacific Islander	52	0.3%
Some other race	5,655	29.1%
Two or more races	2,805	14.4%

=== 2010 census ===
The 2010 United States census reported that East Hemet had a population of 17,418. The population density was 3,341.2 inhabitants per square mile (1,290.0/km^{2}). The racial makeup of East Hemet was (62.4%) White, (11.9%) African American, (1.9%) Native American, (1.6%) Asian, (0.2%) Pacific Islander, (17.2%) from other races, and (4.9%) from two or more races. Hispanic or Latino of any race was 38.9%.

The Census reported that 17,352 people (99.6% of the population) lived in households, 56 (0.3%) lived in non-institutionalized group quarters, and 10 (0.1%) were institutionalized.

There were 5,320 households, out of which 2,499 (47.0%) had children under the age of 18 living in them, 2,908 (54.7%) were opposite-sex married couples living together, 936 (17.6%) had a female householder with no husband present, 408 (7.7%) had a male householder with no wife present. There were 429 (8.1%) unmarried opposite-sex partnerships, and 48 (0.9%) same-sex married couples or partnerships. 797 households (15.0%) were made up of individuals, and 349 (6.6%) had someone living alone who was 65 years of age or older. The average household size was 3.26. There were 4,252 families (79.9% of all households); the average family size was 3.55.

The population age distribution is 5,224 people (30.0%) under the age of 18, 1,912 people (11.0%) aged 18 to 24, 4,319 people (24.8%) aged 25 to 44, 4,145 people (23.8%) aged 45 to 64, and 1,818 people (10.4%) who were 65 years of age or older. The median age was 32.2 years. For every 100 females, there were 98.1 males. For every 100 females age 18 and over, there were 94.5 males.

There were 5,869 housing units at an average density of 1,125.8 per square mile (434.7 per km^{2}), of which 3,510 (66.0%) were owner-occupied, and 1,810 (34.0%) were occupied by renters. The homeowner vacancy rate was 3.5%; the rental vacancy rate was 10.1%. 10,808 people (62.1% of the population) lived in owner-occupied housing units and 6,544 people (37.6%) lived in rental housing units.

=== 2023 American Community Survey ===
In 2023, the US Census Bureau estimated that 16.3% of the population were foreign-born. Of all people aged 5 or older, 65.8% spoke only English at home, 30.8% spoke Spanish, 1.6% spoke other Indo-European languages, and 1.8% spoke Asian or Pacific Islander languages. Of those aged 25 or older, 78.9% were high school graduates and 10.8% had a bachelor's degree.

The median household income was $80,621, and the per capita income was $25,752. About 17.4% of families and 18.3% of the population were below the poverty line.

== Government ==
In the California State Legislature, East Hemet is in the 19th senatorial district, represented by Republican Rosilicie Ochoa Bogh, and in the 60th Assembly district, represented by Democrat Corey Jackson.

In the United States House of Representatives, East Hemet is in California's 25th congressional district, represented by Democrat Raul Ruiz.

== Education ==
It is in the Hemet Unified School District.
