= Mountain Center, California =

Mountain Center
- Unincorporated community census-designated place
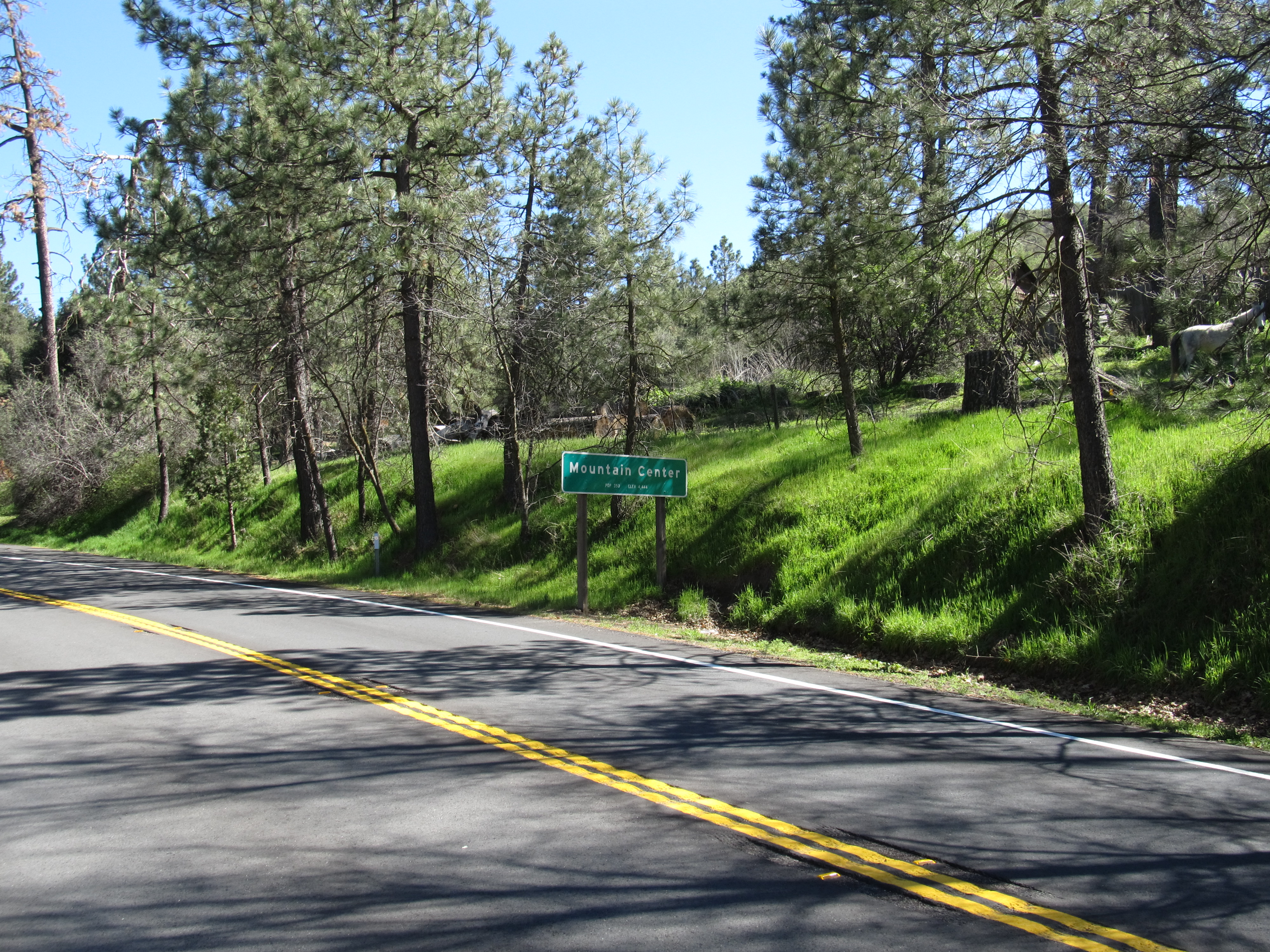

- Location in Riverside County, California

- Location within the state of California Mountain Center (the United States)
- Coordinates: 33°42′15″N 116°43′33″W
- Country: United States
- State: California
- County: Riverside

Area
  - Total: 1.886 sq mi (4.885 km^{2})
  - Land: 1.885 sq mi (4.881 km^{2})
  - Water: 0.0015 sq mi (0.004 km^{2}) 0.09%
- Elevation: 4,518 ft (1,377 m)

Population (2020)
  - Total: 66
  - Density: 35/sq mi (14/km^{2})
- Time zone: UTC-8 (Pacific (PST))
  - Summer (DST): UTC-7 (PDT)
- ZIP codes: 92561
- GNIS feature IDs: 1661073; 2629133

Mountain Center is an unincorporated community and census-designated place in the San Jacinto Mountains, within western central Riverside County, California. As of the 2020 census, Mountain Center had a population of 66.

== Geography ==
It lies centered on the junction of State Route 74 and State Route 243 in the southern division of San Bernardino National Forest. Mountain Center lies just north of Lake Hemet, midway between Hemet and Palm Desert, just south of the town of Idyllwild, and it is southeast of the city of Riverside, the county seat of Riverside County. Its elevation is 4,518 feet (1,377 m). Although Mountain Center is unincorporated, it has a post office, with the ZIP code of 92561.

According to the United States Census Bureau, the CDP covers an area of 1.9 square miles (4.9 km^{2}), 99.91% of it land, and 0.09% of it water.

Lake Hemet is the only major body of water in Mountain Center.

The Mountain Fire and the Cranston Fire burn scars remain visible in the community.

== Demographics ==
Historical population
Census	Pop.	Note	%±
2010	63		—
2020	66		4.8%
U.S. Decennial Census; 1860–1870 1880-1890; 1900 1910 1920; 1930 1940 1950; 1960 1970 1980; 1990 2000 2010

Mountain Center first appeared as a census designated place in the 2010 U.S. census.

The 2020 United States census reported that Mountain Center had a population of 66. The population density was 35.0 inhabitants per square mile (13.5/km^{2}). The racial makeup of Mountain Center was 51 (77%) White, 0 (0%) African American, 1 (2%) Native American, 1 (2%) Asian, 0 (0%) Pacific Islander, 0 (0%) from other races, and 13 (20%) from two or more races. Hispanic or Latino of any race were 9 persons (14%).

The whole population lived in households. There were 39 households, out of which 2 (5%) had children under the age of 18 living in them, 23 (59%) were married-couple households, 0 (0%) were cohabiting couple households, 3 (8%) had a female householder with no partner present, and 13 (33%) had a male householder with no partner present. 9 households (23%) were one person, and 2 (5%) were one person aged 65 or older. The average household size was 1.69. There were 27 families (69% of all households).

The age distribution was 9 people (14%) under the age of 18, 1 people (2%) aged 18 to 24, 13 people (20%) aged 25 to 44, 29 people (44%) aged 45 to 64, and 14 people (21%) who were 65 years of age or older. The median age was 54.3 years. There were 35 males and 31 females.

There were 43 housing units at an average density of 22.8 units per square mile (8.8 units/km^{2}), of which 39 (91%) were occupied. Of these, 27 (69%) were owner-occupied, and 12 (31%) were occupied by renters.

== Government ==
Federal:

- In the United States House of Representatives, Mountain Center is in California's 41st congressional district, represented by Republican Ken Calvert.
- In the United States Senate, California is represented by Democrats Alex Padilla and Adam Schiff.

State:

- In the California State Legislature, Mountain Center is in the 32nd Senate District, represented by Republican Kelly Seyarto, and in the 47th Assembly district, represented by Republican Greg Wallis.

Local:

- In the Riverside County Board of Supervisors, Mountain Center is in the Fourth District, represented by V. Manuel Perez.
- In the jurisdiction of the Riverside County Sheriff's Department, with Sheriff Chad Bianco.
- Fire service is provided by Riverside County Fire through a cooperative agreement with CAL FIRE
- Emergency medical service is provided by American Medical Response (AMR); however, the Idyllwild Fire Protection District is often the de facto emergency medical service under mutual aid due to its being in closer proximity than AMR.

== Transportation ==
Forest Folk, using a grant from the Riverside County Transportation Commission, operates the Idyllwild Shuttle, which provides door-to-door service.

== Education ==
It is in the Hemet Unified School District.

== See also ==
- Idyllwild-Pine Cove, California
- Pinyon Pines, California
- San Jacinto Mountains topics
