= Idyllwild Fire Protection District =

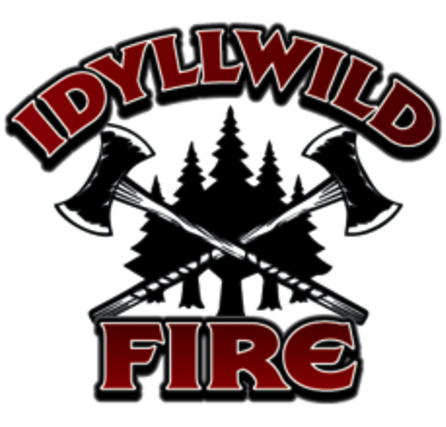

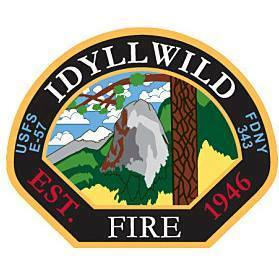

Operational area
- Country: United States
- State: California
- County: Riverside
- Town: Idyllwild and Fern Valley

Agency overview
- Established: 1946
- Annual calls: 1088 (2018)
- Employees: 13 (2020)
- Annual budget: $2,354,000 (2018)
- Staffing: Career
- Fire chief: Mark LaMont
- EMS level: ALS
- Motto: "From our Family to Yours"

Facilities and equipment
- Stations: 1
- Engines: 2
- Trucks: 1
- Squads: 1
- Ambulances: 6
- Tenders: 1

Website
- Official website

The Idyllwild Fire Protection District (IFPD) provides firefighting, rescue, emergency medical services, and ambulance transport services for the unincorporated communities of Idyllwild and Fern Valley, in Southern California.

== History ==
The Idyllwild Fire Protection District began out of an all-volunteer fire department and was established in 1946. The district was established when community members reported being ignored by the fire departments who did not want to travel the long distance up the mountain, so voters took their security and protection into their own hands. It remained fully volunteer-run until 1960 when a switch was made to paid-call staff to provide 24-hour fire service. The Idyllwild Fire Protection District began providing paramedic service in 1979.

== Organization ==
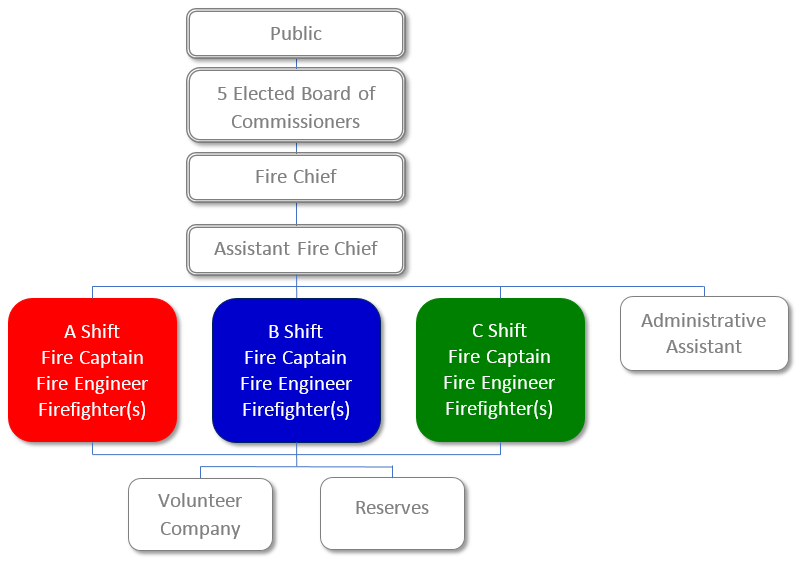
Idyllwild Fire Protection District Organizational Chart

=== Board of Commissioners ===
A five-member board of commissioners, made up by elected residents, oversees the Idyllwild Fire Protection District. The board includes President Ralph Hoetger, Vice President Henry Sawicki, Secretary Rhonda Andrewson, and Commissioners Christina Reitz and Dennis Fogle. Each member serves a four-year term.

=== Staff ===
The Idyllwild Fire Protection District operates one fire station, station 621. Fire personnel includes Chief Mark LaMont and three shifts, each including a captain, engineer, firefighter, and reserve firefighter, with multiple paramedics assigned to each shift. Staff rotates days on-duty by assigned shift. The Idyllwild fire department also staffs a medical director, EMS coordinator, and an administrative assistant. A volunteer fire company, Idyllwild Volunteer Fire Company 621, also operates in conjunction with the district.

== Operations ==
The Idyllwild Fire Protection District operates in the San Jacinto Mountains of Riverside County. It is the fire station that holds the position of lowest cost to operate in Riverside County. As of 2018, the station operates on a budget of approximately 60% of the average station budget of the Riverside County Fire Department, who manages the other stations in the mountain area, while maintaining more equipment than adjoining stations and receiving an Insurance Service Office rating of 2, on a scale of 1(best) to 9(worst), where Riverside County Fire received a score of 9 in the surrounding areas. The Idyllwild Fire Protection District is also the station licensee for WNKI 578, a local emergency radio station that broadcasts to the local community.

=== Types of apparatus ===
The Idyllwild Fire Protection District utilizes a wide array of apparatus and equipment.

==== Engines ====
- Engine 621 is an International 7400 built in 2008.
- Engine 622

==== Truck ====
- Truck 621 is a Spartan Gladiator built in 2006.

==== Brush ====
- Brush 621 is an International 7400 built in 2006.

==== ALS ambulances ====
- Idyllwild Fire operates six ALS ambulances.

==== Other apparatus ====
- 2 Chief's vehicles
- 1 Squad (S621 is a Ford F-450)
- 1 Water Tender (WT621 is a 1989 Pierce Dash 4×4)
- 1 Patrol vehicle

=== Dispatch ===
The Idyllwild Fire Department holds a contract with Riverside County Fire Department for dispatch services.
