= Lake Hemet =

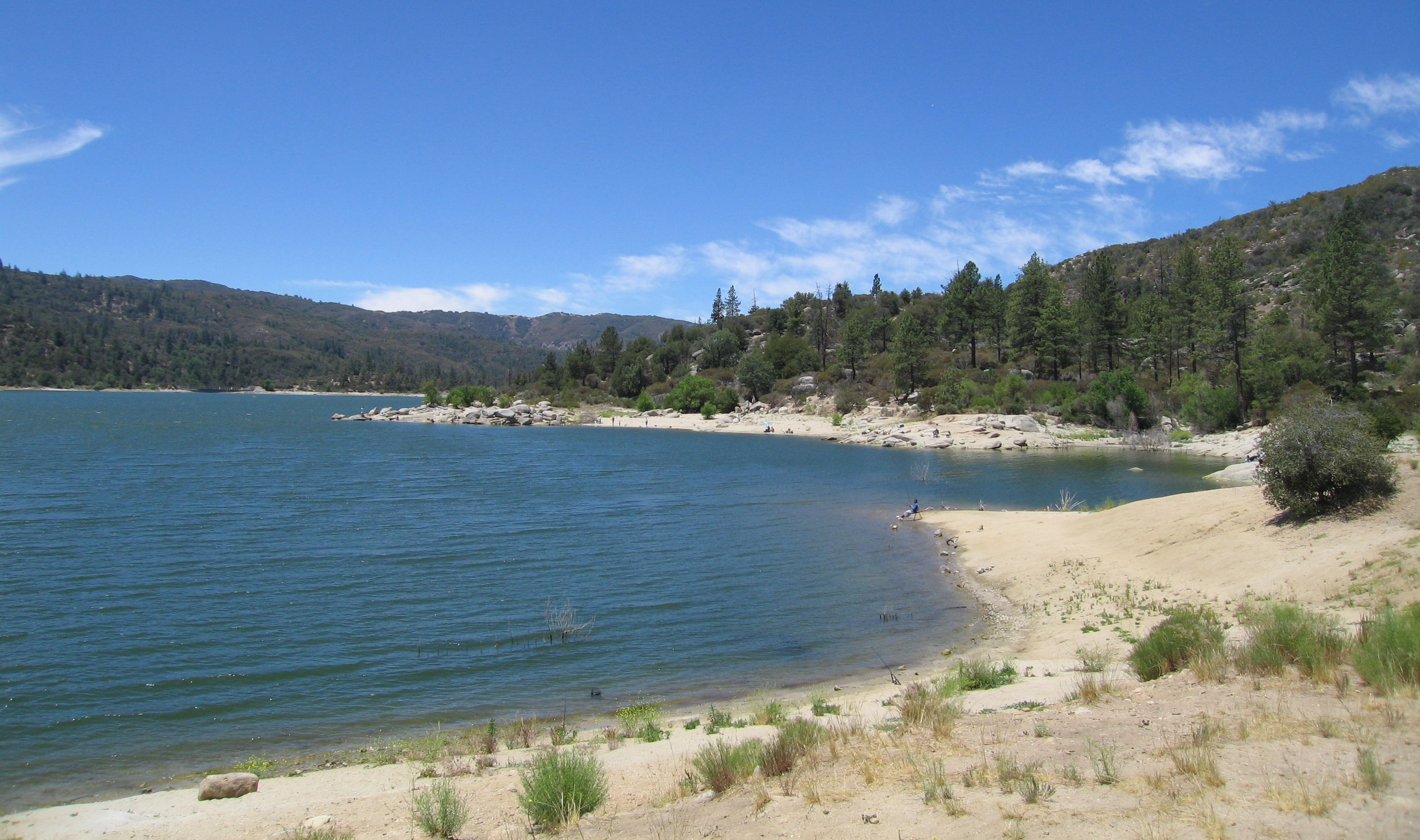

- Location within California Location within the United States
- Location: Mountain Center, Riverside County, California
- Coordinates: 33°39′58″N 116°41′35″W
- Lake type: reservoir
- Primary inflows: San Jacinto River
- Primary outflows: San Jacinto River
- Basin countries: United States
- Surface area: 470 acres (190 ha)
- Water volume: 14,000 acre-feet (17,000,000 m^{3})
- Shore length^{1}: 12 mi (19 km)
- Surface elevation: 4,340 ft (1,320 m)
- ^{1} Shore length is not a well-defined measure.

Lake Hemet is a water storage reservoir located in the San Jacinto Mountains in Mountain Center, Riverside County, California, with a capacity of 14,000 acre-feet (17,000,000 m^{3}) of water. It was privately created in 1895 with the construction of Lake Hemet Dam. Today it is owned and operated by the Lake Hemet Municipal Water District (LHMWD).

== Facts and statistics ==
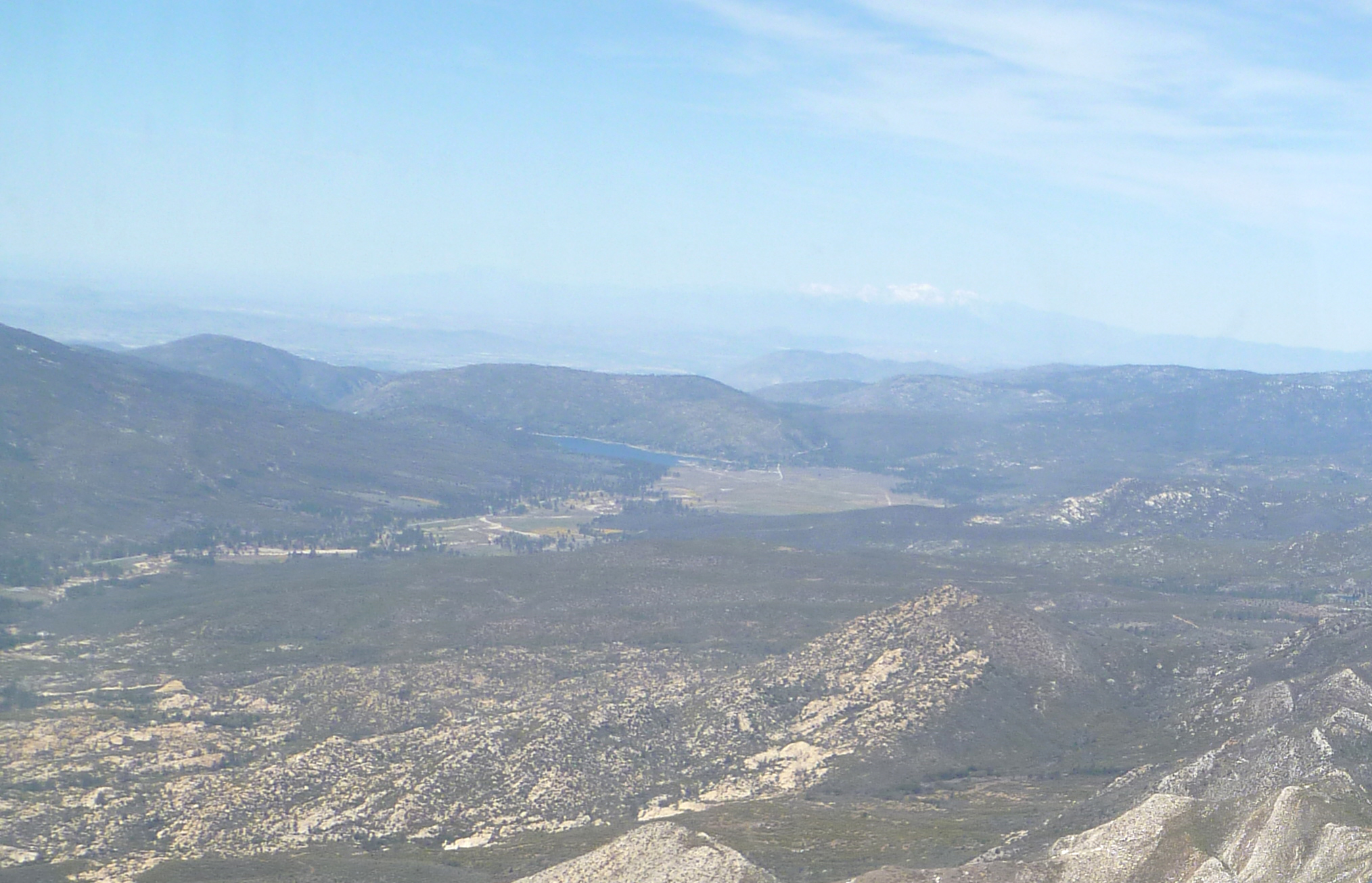
Aerial view of Lake Hemet at the end of the Garner Valley as seen from above the Anza Pass at 8,500 feet MSL.

Lake Hemet is an artificial lake in the San Jacinto Mountains, 4,340 ft (1,323 m) above sea level. Lake Hemet is part of the San Bernardino National Forest. Lake Hemet has a surface area of 470 acres (190 ha) and 12 miles (19 km) of shoreline. Fishing is the primary attraction to the lake, which is stocked with rainbow trout, channel catfish, bluegill and largemouth bass. Other Lake Hemet activities include boating, picnicking, hiking, and camping in the surrounding areas.

LHMWD provides water from Lake Hemet to a geographically diverse service area in Riverside County, including portions of the cities of Hemet and San Jacinto, and the isolated but growing Garner Valley, a community located 4,500-foot (1,400 m) high on San Jacinto Mountain.

LHMWD's customers are represented by a publicly elected board of five directors in 5 divisions. They represent approximately 13,800 domestic and 51 agricultural customers within a 26-square mile (67 km^{2}) service area.

Service connections

- 1,800 in 1955
- 1,873 in 1957
- 2,623 in 1962
- 3,747 in 1967
- 5,000 in 1972
- 6,850 in 1977
- 13,636 in 2003
- 13,960 in 2004

Length of Lake Hemet Municipal Water District Pipeline

- 30.8 miles (49.6 km) in 1957
- 53.59 miles (86.7 km) in 1962
- 78.29 miles (127.6 km) in 1967
- 96.82 miles (155.8 km) in 1972
- 127 miles (204 km) in 1977
- 136 miles (219 km) in 2003
- 139 miles (224 km) in 2004

It is 13 miles (23 km) SW of Palm Springs, California, United States.

== History ==
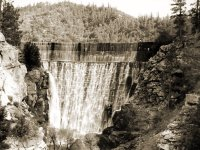
Lake Hemet Dam 1895

Development of the San Jacinto Valley can be traced to 1887, with the formation of the Lake Hemet Water Company and the Hemet Land Company by Edward L. Mayberry, his wealthy San Francisco friend, William F. Whittier, and their partners. These two companies allowed the partnership to acquire land and water rights from the San Jacinto Valley to the west end of Garner Valley in the San Jacinto Mountains.

Lake Hemet Water Company placed the first stone of the Lake Hemet Dam on January 6, 1891. When this arched masonry structure was completed in 1895 at a height of 122.5 feet (37.3 m), it was the largest solid masonry dam in the world—a title it would retain until the construction of Roosevelt Dam in Arizona in 1911. In 1923, the Hemet dam was raised to a height of 135 feet (41 m).

The 1932 opening of the Pines to Palms Highway (SR 74) from the coast to Palm Desert was significant in developing Lake Hemet for increased recreational uses.

LHMWD was founded on September 27, 1955, to take over the activities of the Lake Hemet Water Company, purchasing the Lake Hemet water system with funds raised through a bond initiative.

== Appearances in popular culture ==
Shots of the lake were used in the 1980s CBS television show Airwolf, in which recurring character Stringfellow Hawke lived in a cabin on the lake.

The lake was featured in Visiting... with Huell Howser Episode 923.

== See also ==
- List of lakes in California
