= Mount San Jacinto State Park =

Place in California listed on National Register of Historic Places

- IUCN category Ib (wilderness area)
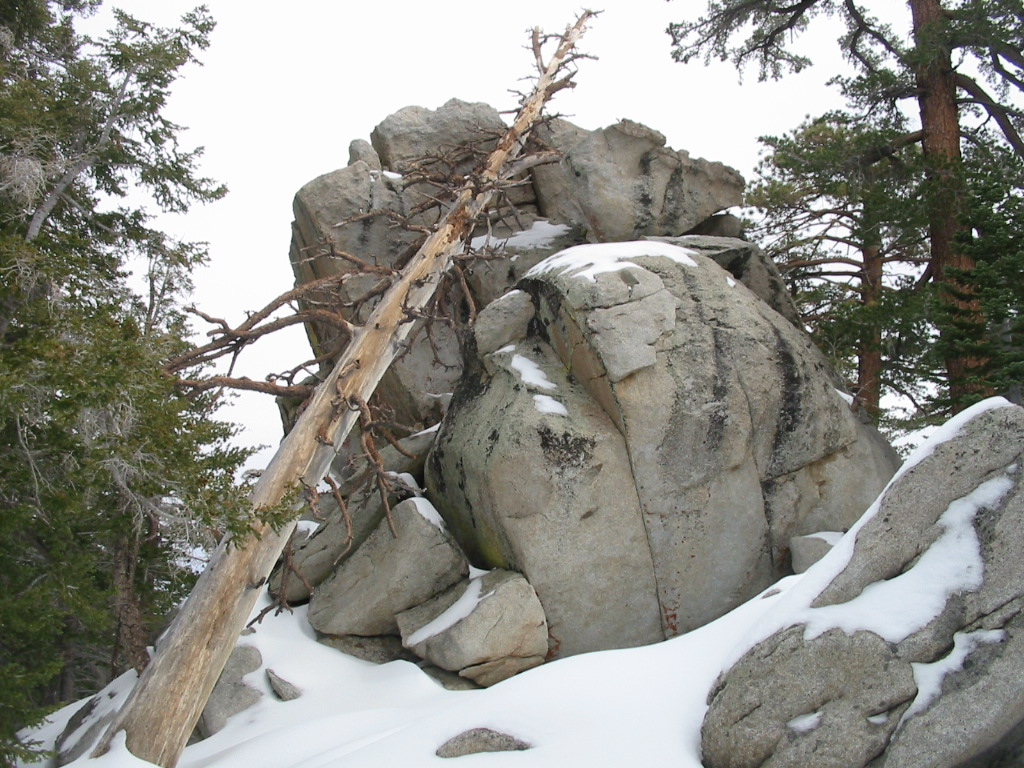
- Rock formation and trees seen from Round Valley trail in winter

- Location within southern California Location within California Location within the United States
- Interactive map of Mount San Jacinto State Park
- Location: Riverside County, California, United States
- Nearest city: Idyllwild, California
- Coordinates: 33°48′N 116°40′W
- Area: 14,000 acres (5,700 ha)
- Established: 1933
- Governing body: California Department of Parks and Recreation

Mount San Jacinto State Park is in the San Jacinto Mountains, of the Peninsular Ranges system, in Riverside County, California, United States. A majority of the park is within the Santa Rosa and San Jacinto Mountains National Monument. The park is near the Greater Los Angeles and San Diego metropolitan areas. Part of the natural area is old-growth forest and recognized by the Old-Growth Forest Network.

== Geography ==
The Mount San Jacinto State Park encompasses the weathered granite summit of Mount San Jacinto, which at 10,834 feet (3,302 m) above sea level makes this the second highest peak and mountain range in Southern California. It is accessible by the Palm Springs Aerial Tramway and lies on the Pacific Crest Trail.

Newton B. Drury Peak within Mount San Jacinto State Park is named after the fourth director of the U.S. National Park Service, who was also a long-term leader of the Save the Redwoods League.

== 2011 State budget crisis closure ==
The state park was one of 48 state parks proposed for closure in January 2008 by then Governor Arnold Schwarzenegger as part of a state deficit reduction program. During the 2008–10 California budget crisis the legislature considered the state park systems funding, operations, and closures. By 2011 the legislature and Governor Jerry Brown enacted Assembly Bill 95 in March, which closed the park temporarily over certain days.

== See also ==
- Santa Rosa and San Jacinto Mountains National Monument
- Cranston Fire
