= Gender Reveal Fire =

Gender Reveal Fire may refer to:

- El Dorado Fire, a 2020 wildfire in California
- Sawmill Fire (2017), a 2017 wildfire in Arizona
