= Goodwin Fire =

2017 wildfire in Arizona, United States

- Part of the 2017 Arizona wildfires
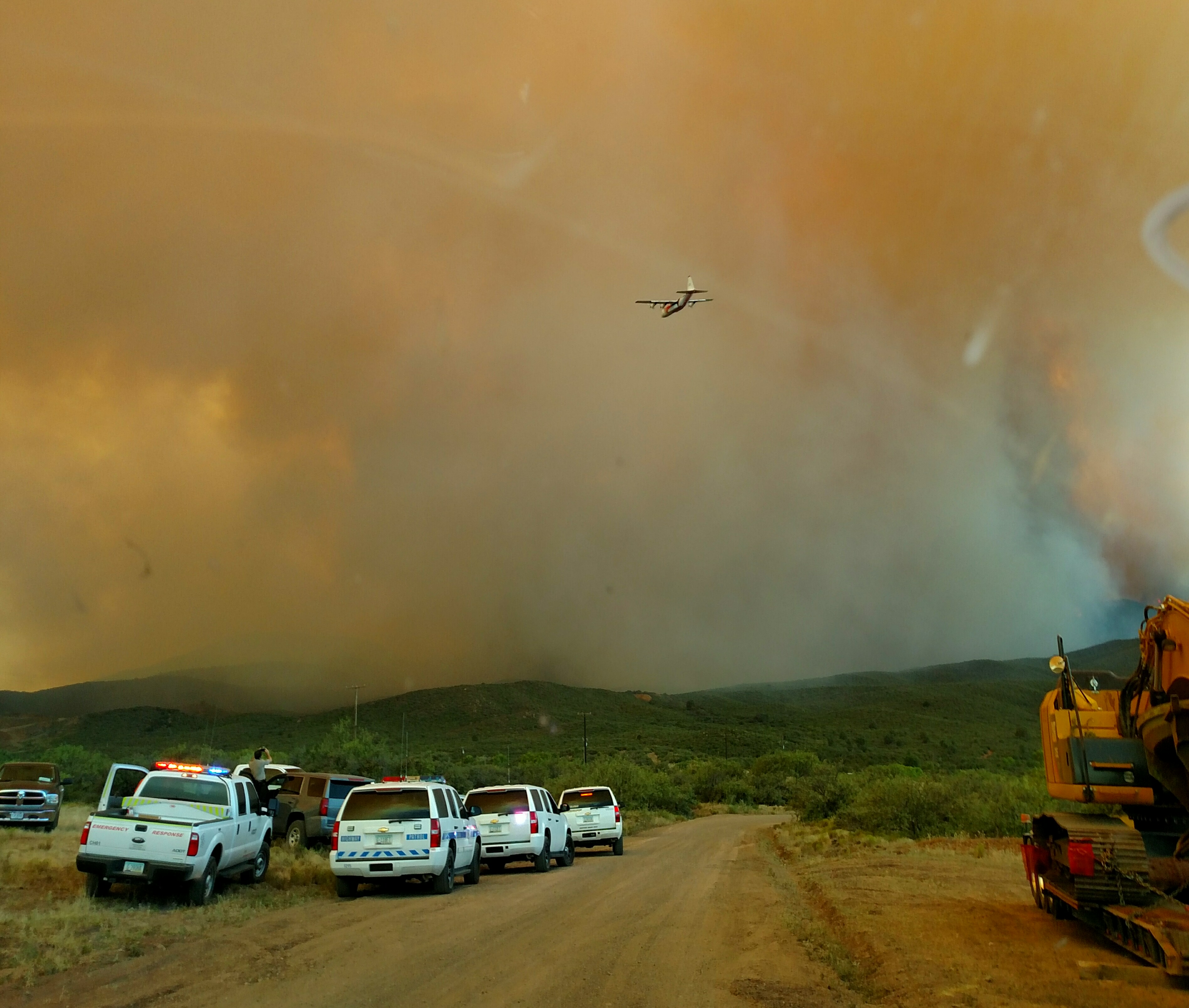
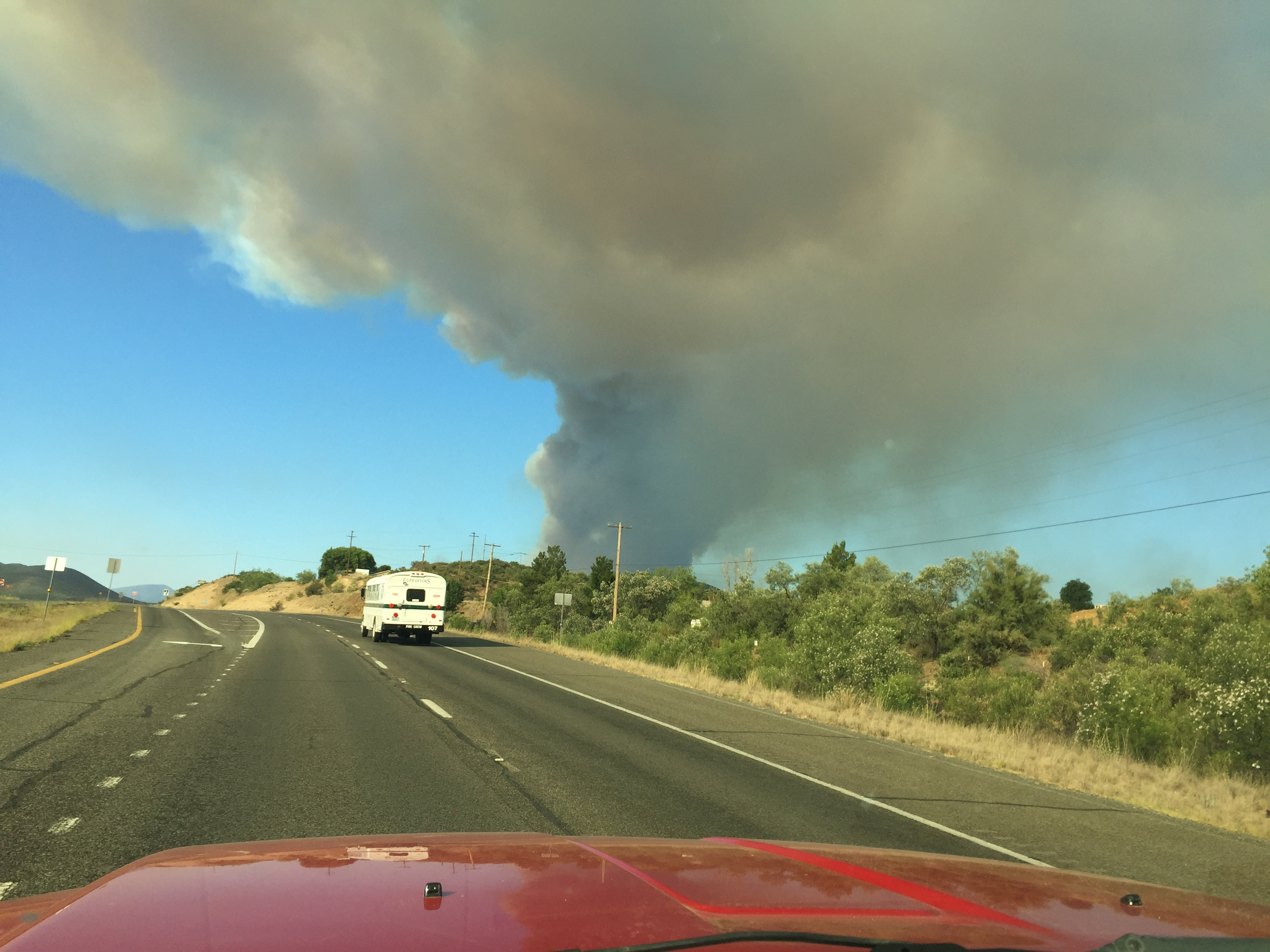
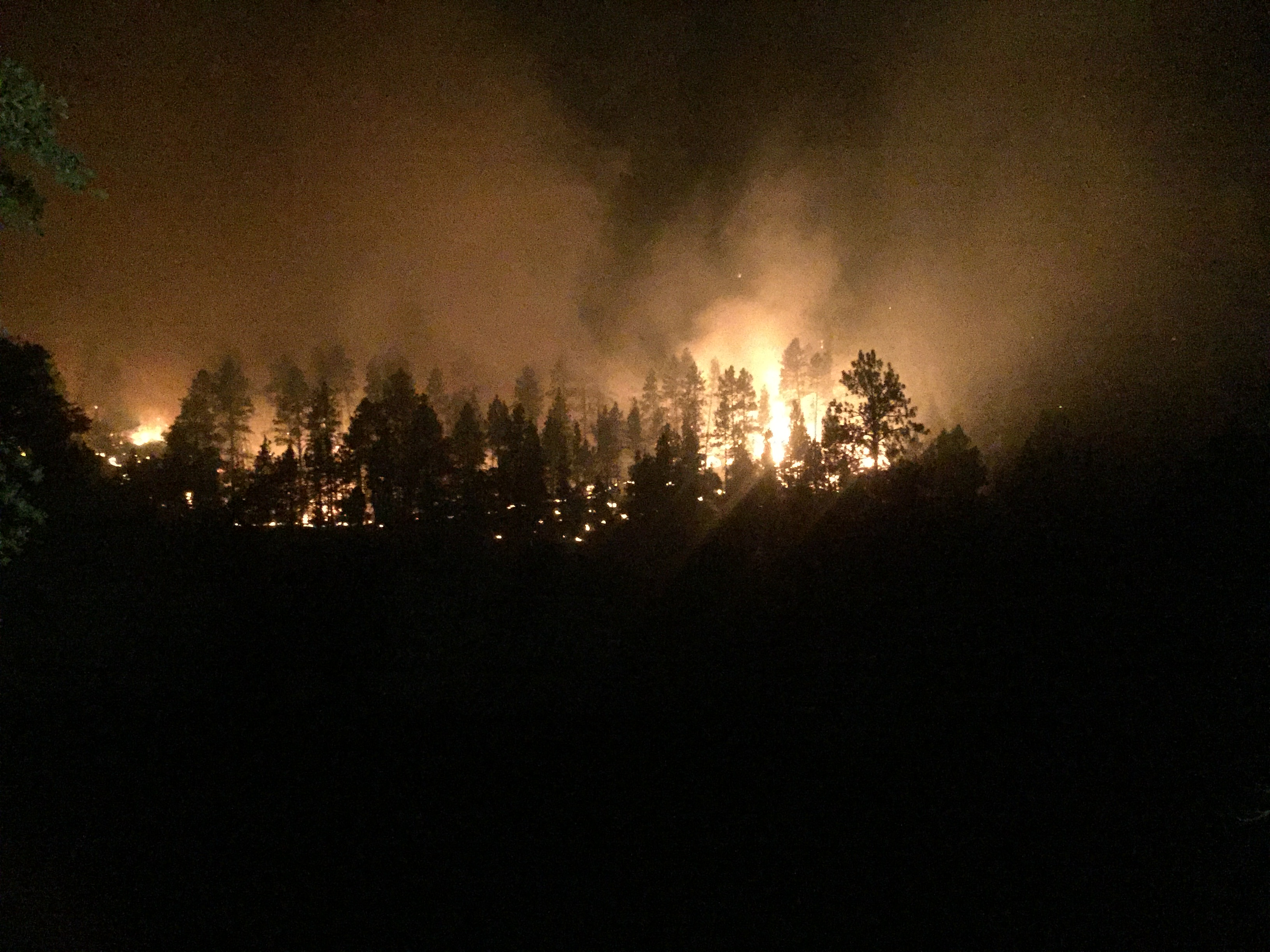
- Top: The Goodwin Fire burning in the Bradshaw Mountains; Bottom left: The fire seen from Highway 69 near Mayer, Arizona.; Bottom right: The fire burning in the Prescott National Forest
- Date: June 24 – July 10, 2017
- Location: Yavapai County, Arizona, U.S.
- Coordinates: 34°21′27″N 112°22′21″W

Statistics
- Burned area: 28,516 acres (11,540 ha; 44.556 sq mi)

Impacts
- Evacuated: 9,000+
- Structures lost: 17
- Cost: $15 million (equivalent to $20 million in 2025)

Ignition
- Cause: Undetermined

Map
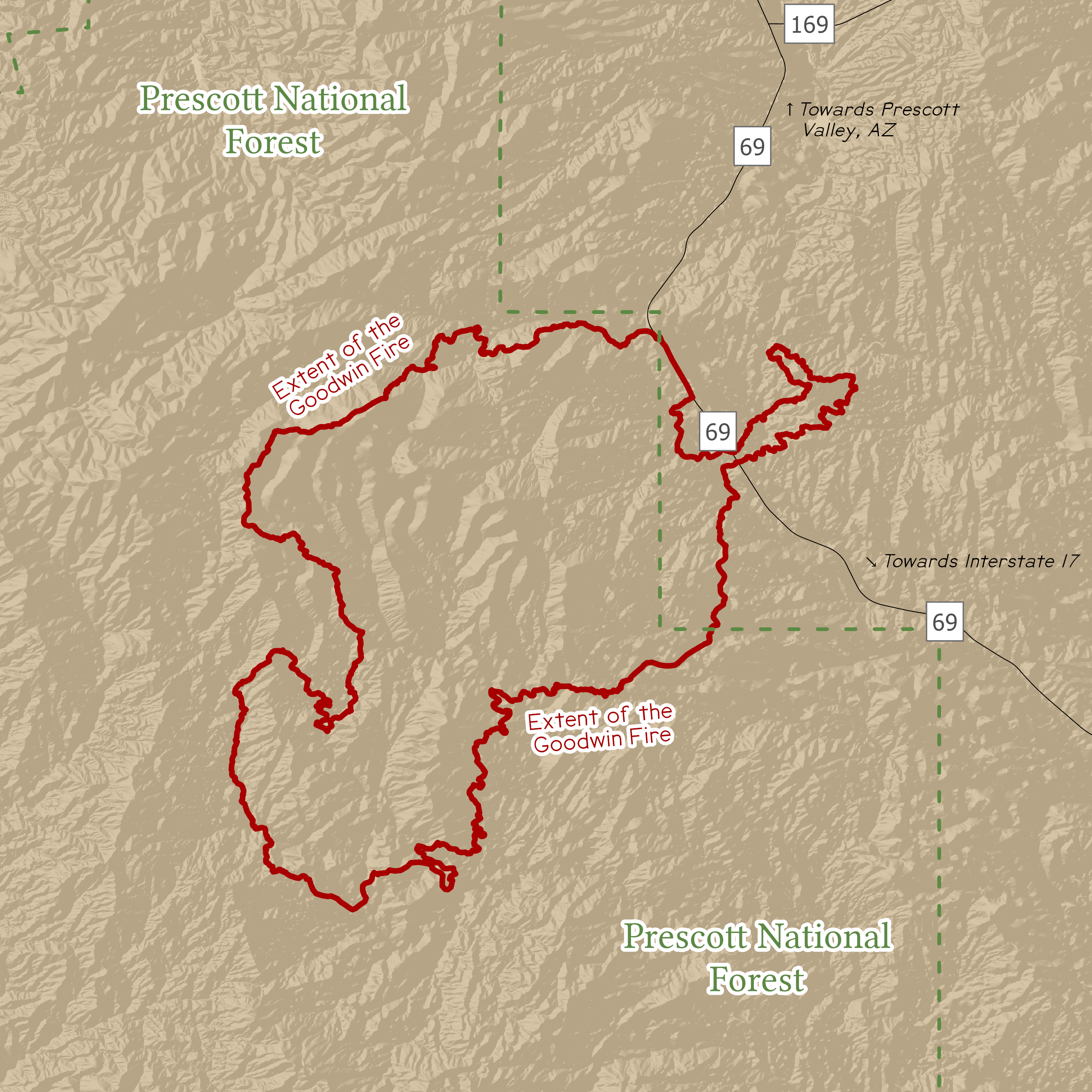
- Area burnt by the Goodwin Fire according to the National Interagency Fire Center

The Goodwin Fire was a wildfire that burned 28,516 acres (11,540 ha) in the U.S. state of Arizona over 16 days, from June 24 to July 10, 2017. The fire destroyed 17 homes and damaged another 19 structures, but no firefighters or civilians were injured or died in the fire. Investigators did not determine any particular cause for the fire.

The fire was first detected on June 24, 2017, by a two-man fire patrol that spotted smoke in the Bradshaw Mountains near Prescott, Arizona. Benefiting from undisturbed chaparral and high winds, the fire spread rapidly and forced the evacuation of several townships within Yavapai County and the closure of Arizona State Route 69. Despite firefighting aircraft being twice grounded by civilian drones operating in the burn area, firefighters made rapid progress containing the fire's spread after June 28. The fire was fully contained on July 10 and had lasting environmental consequences.

== Background ==
Wildfires are a natural part of the ecological cycle of the Southwestern United States. The Goodwin Fire was one of 2,321 wildfires that burned a total of 429,564 acres (173,838 ha) in Arizona in 2017. The state had expected a "normal" fire season in its forests but high potential in the state's southern grasslands due to high temperatures, low humidity, and an abundance of fuels. By August 2017, wildfires had burned the most land since the 2011 season. In May 2018, the Ecological Restoration Institute at Northern Arizona University published a study of the 2017 wildfire season in Arizona and New Mexico and observed that more land had burned in Arizona than the average of the previous ten years. Eleven fires were studied, of which ten were in Arizona and included the Goodwin Fire.

== Fire ==
At around 4:00 pm (MST), June 24, 2017, a two-man fire patrol monitoring the Bradshaw Mountains observed a column of smoke rising from a location about 14 mi (23 km) south of Prescott, in Yavapai County, Arizona. The pair reported the fire and began digging a firebreak; firefighting units arrived two hours later and began fire suppression efforts. Fed by undisturbed growths of dry shrubland (chaparral) and high winds, and with fire crews impaired by difficult terrain, the fire grew from 150 acres (61 ha) on June 24 to 25,000 acres (10,000 ha) on June 29. Yavapai County officials issued warnings about the smoke billowing from the fire on June 29.

In response to the Goodwin Fire's rapid spread, all roads within or leading into the burn area were closed on June 26, and the communities of Mayer and Breezy Pines were evacuated the next day. On June 27, Arizona State Route 69 (SR 69) was closed between Prescott and Interstate 17 and residents of Walker, Potato Patch, Mountain Pine Acres, and Mount Union were issued preemptive evacuation notices. Doug Ducey, the Governor of Arizona, declared a state of emergency in Yavapai County the next day, and he secured additional state and federal resources for containing the Goodwin Fire. Ducey visited Dewey–Humboldt and the perimeter of the fire on June 29 to meet with firefighters and evacuees.

By June 29, the containment of the Goodwin Fire's spread was estimated at 43%. Evacuation orders for residents of Mayer were lifted, as were all preemptive evacuation orders. SR 69 reopened on June 30. Firefighting aircraft were grounded on June 28 by a civilian drone flying over the burn area, a crime in Arizona (causing interference with emergency or law-enforcement efforts) for which the drone's operator was arrested on July 1. The operator was charged on July 7 with hindering firefighting efforts, but the charges were dropped on August 18. By July 4, when firefighting aircraft were again grounded by civilian drones, the Goodwin Fire had grown to 28,508 acres (11,537 ha) but had been 91% contained. The fire was fully contained on July 10.

== Aftermath ==
The Goodwin Fire burned 28,516 acres (11,540 ha) over 16 days and cost $15 million to suppress (equivalent to $20 million in 2025). Of the total area burned, 56% suffered total foliage mortality. The fire forced the evacuation of 9,000 people, destroyed 17 homes, and damaged another 19 structures. More than 650 firefighters were involved in containing the Goodwin Fire at its height.

As early as July 5, officials began warning of the possibility of severe flooding during the North American monsoon as a consequence of the Goodwin Fire creating terrain incapable of absorbing water. On July 19, rainwater drained from the Goodwin Fire burn scar into Big Bug Creek, near Mayer, which overflowed into a trailer park within Mayer's municipal limits. The flood damaged 109 houses and two residents had to be rescued from their homes. Some evacuations ordered in response to the flooding remained in place until August 19.

Firefighters suspected a human cause, but the subsequent investigation did not determine a specific cause.

=== Environmental consequences ===
On August 8, the United States Forest Service published a burned area emergency response assessment of the Goodwin Fire's burn scar and recommended immediate stabilization of severely burned areas via aerial reseeding. Senator Jeff Flake (R-AZ) toured the burn scar on August 17. Helicopters began dropping 27,365 lb (12,413 kg) of grass seed on August 18.
