= Frye Fire =

2017 wildfire in Arizona, United States

- Part of the 2017 Arizona wildfires
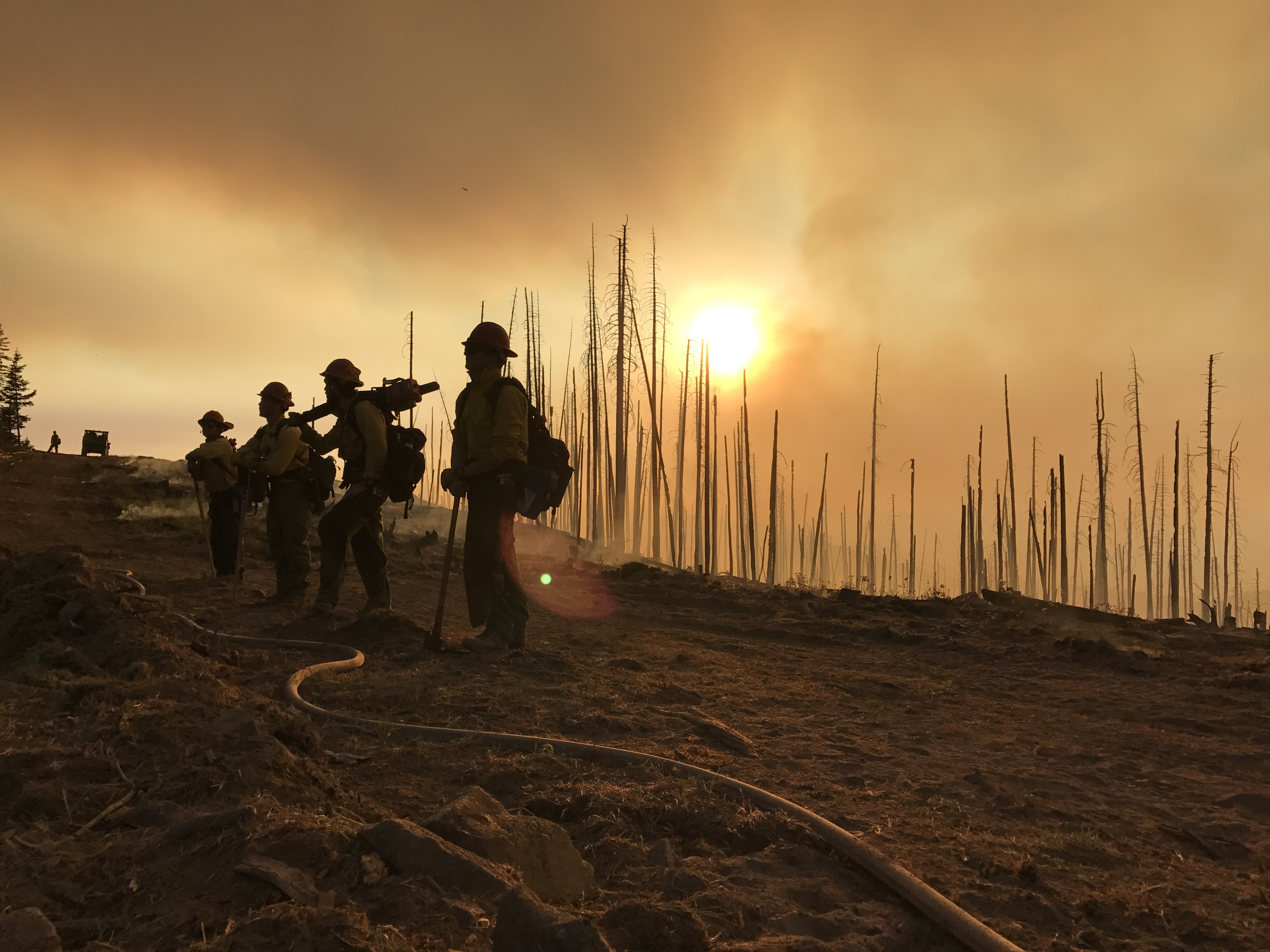
- A firefighting team near the Frye Fire, June 17, 2017
- Date: June 7 - September 1, 2017
- Location: Graham County, Arizona, US
- Coordinates: 32.735°N 109.872°W

Statistics
- Burned area: 48,443 acres (19,604 ha; 75.692 sq mi)

Impacts
- Cost: $26 million (equivalent to $34 million in 2025)

Ignition
- Cause: Lightning

Map
- Location within Arizona Location within the United States

The Frye Fire was a wildfire that burned 48,443 acres (19,604 ha) in Graham County, Arizona, United States, from June 7 to September 1, 2017. The fire was ignited by a lightning strike on Mount Graham, within the Coronado National Forest, and spread rapidly until it was mostly contained on July 12. The Frye Fire destroyed three buildings, briefly threatened the Mount Graham International Observatory, cost $26 million to contain (equivalent to $34 million in 2025) and suppress, and involved more than 800 firefighters. There were no fatalities, but 63 firefighters were quarantined as a result of a strep throat outbreak.

Beginning in July 2017, rains from the annual North American monsoon season washed sediments off mountain slopes in the Frye Fire's burn scar. This runoff, consisting of rainwater, ash, and debris, clogged creeks and damaged infrastructure within Graham County. The fire particularly affected the endangered Mount Graham red squirrel, whose remaining habitat on Mount Graham was devastated.

== Background ==
Wildfires are a natural part of the ecological cycle of the Southwestern United States. The Frye Fire was one of 2,321 wildfires that burned 429,564 acres (173,838 ha) in Arizona in 2017. Arizona State Forester Jeff Whitney expected a typical season in the state's northern forests but one with high fire potential in the state's southern grasslands because of high temperatures, low humidity, and an abundance of fuels. By August 2017, wildfires had burned the most land since the 2011 season.

== Fire ==
On June 7, 2017, lightning struck a portion of chaparral on Mount Graham in the Coronado National Forest and Graham County, Arizona, which had not burned since the Nuttall Complex Fire in 2004. By June 9, an area of 15–20 acres (6.1–8.1 ha) was on fire, and the flames were spreading in the direction of the Frye Mesa Reservoir. The United States Forest Service (USFS) closed trails near the fire and began fire suppression, which was complicated by difficult terrain. The burned area grew from 630 acres (250 ha) by June 13 to 6,305 acres (2,552 ha) by June 18. The USFS closed all campgrounds and trails in the Pinaleño Mountains within the Coronado National Forest on June 19.

Beginning on June 18, an enlarged force of over 300 firefighters focused on preventing the Frye Fire from reaching the Mount Graham International Observatory (MGIO). Over the next day the fire spread towards but did not reach the MGIO; Pavel Gabor, Vice Director of the Vatican Advanced Technology Telescope (VATT), stated that fires had reached to within 30 ft (9 m) of the VATT. On June 24, the Frye Fire was pushed back from the MGIO and was estimated to be 29 percent contained, but the burned area had grown to 35,569 acres (14,394 ha).

On June 23, Doug Ducey, Governor of Arizona, declared a state of emergency in Graham County, securing additional state and federal aid for containing the Frye Fire. Firefighters made progress on containing the spread of the Frye Fire on June 25 and June 26, which allowed Gabor to inspect the VATT on June 27 and report that the facility had sustained no heat or smoke damage. From June 27 to July 12 the Frye Fire grew from 38,395 acres (15,538 ha) to 48,443 acres (19,604 ha). The fire was 88 percent contained by July 12. Recreational areas within the Coronado National Forest began reopening on July 13. By July 17 the fire had not grown any further and firefighters were demobilized to contain other wildfires.

=== Strep throat outbreak ===
On June 17, the USFS announced that an outbreak of streptococcal pharyngitis (strep throat) had begun among the firefighters assigned to contain the Frye Fire. Tucson-based ABC affiliate KGUN-TV reported on June 18 that 21 firefighters had been quarantined; other local news organizations quoted a USFS spokesman who reported a total of 45 cases. According to a report published by the Wildfire Lessons Learned Center (WLLC), a federally-funded research database, quarantine of personnel showing strep throat symptoms, regular testing for strep throat, and regular disinfection of equipment began on June 16. No new cases were detected after June 16; 300 people were exposed to strep throat, of which 63 individuals were quarantined. During the 2020 Western United States wildfire season and the concurrent COVID-19 pandemic, the WLLC and some news publications highlighted the Frye Fire strep throat outbreak as an example of how to effectively contain outbreaks of infectious diseases in firefighting camps.

== Aftermath ==
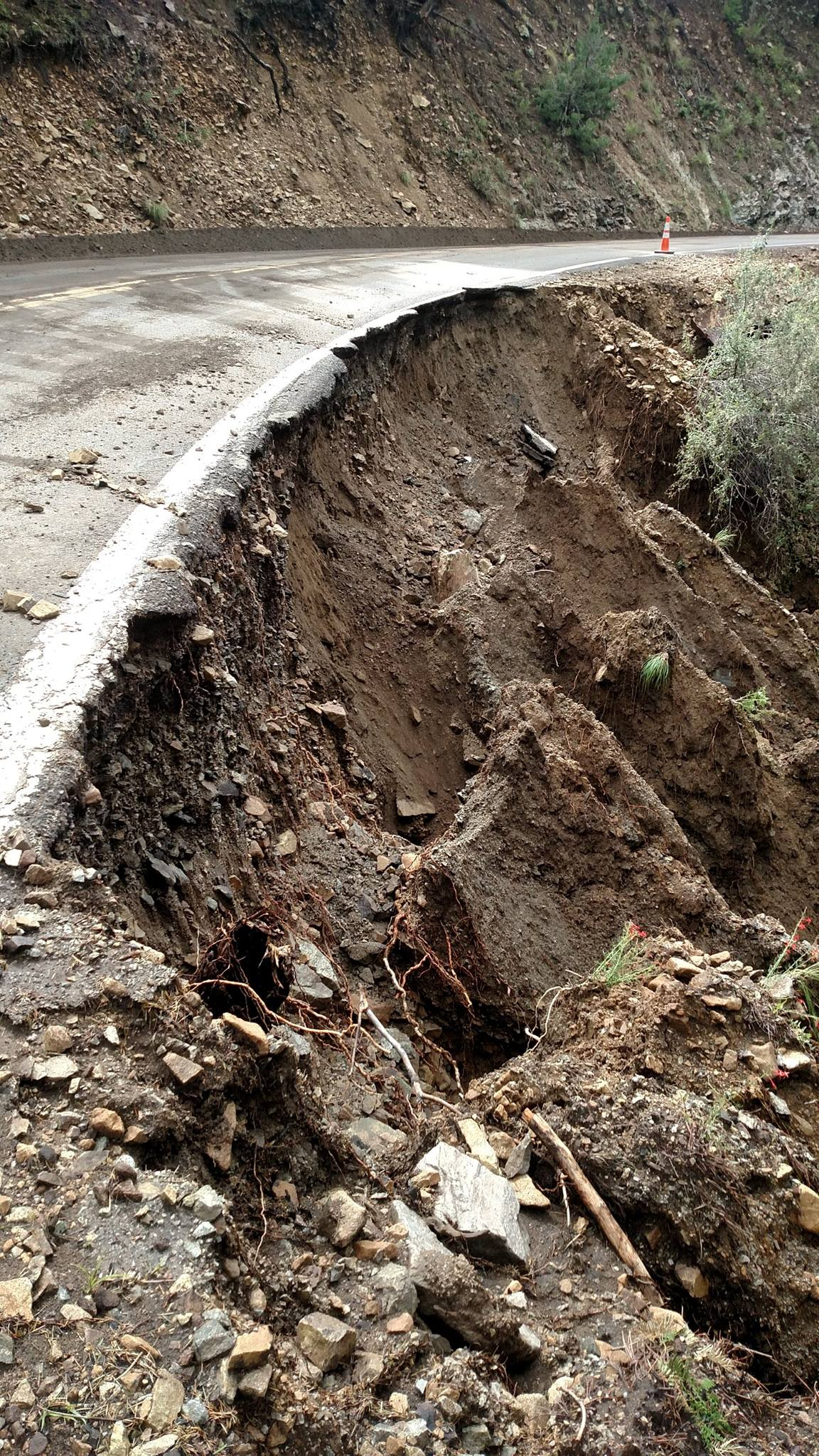
Damage to Arizona State Route 366 from runoff, July 24, 2017

The Frye Fire burned 48,443 acres (19,604 ha) over 86 days, growing to its greatest extent on July 12, and cost $26 million (equivalent to $34 million in 2025) to suppress. Of the total area burned, 13 percent suffered total foliage mortality. Three structures were damaged or destroyed by the Frye Fire. More than 800 firefighters worked to contain the Frye Fire at its height.

By July 18, a USFS Burned Area Emergency Response (BAER) team began assessing the environmental and civic risks posed by the Frye Fire's burn scar. They released a report on July 20 that recommended stabilizing soil deprived of understory and the clearing of roads of drainages. At the same time, Graham County officials issued warnings about severe, damaging floods as annual monsoon rains were expected to wash unsecured, burned soil out of the Frye Fire's burn scar. Those monsoon rains arrived by July 19 and washed surface runoff laden with ash into nearby communities, prompting the Coronado National Forest to delay reopening and the closure on July 31 of Arizona State Route 366 (SR 366) after it was damaged by runoff. Two homes were damaged on July 31 when Ash Creek overflowed and was partially filled in with sediments washed out of the burn scar. On August 11, the Ash Creek flooding threatened to shut down the town of Pima's sewage system.

The Coronado National Forest secured funding for the implementation of the BAER team's suggestions on July 23, which included aerially reseeding 1,023 acres (414 ha) of the most severely burned parts of the Frye Fire burn scar. By August 10, 57,000 lb (26,000 kg) of sterile barley seeds were dropped over this area to stabilize the ground and allow native grasses to grow and replace the barley. On August 9, a bridge and culvert over Wet Canyon on Mount Graham, which had been damaged by runoff and debris from the burn scar, was demolished to open Wet Canyon as a drainage. Cleanup of Ash Creek and construction of water management infrastructure in and around Pima lasted into September 2017; SR 366 reopened on September 14. In July 2021, the USFS and Arizona Department of Forestry and Fire Management began to employ inmates from the Fort Grant state prison in a three-year project to restore trails on Mount Graham.

=== Effect on the Mount Graham red squirrel ===
The Frye Fire had a traumatic effect on the Mount Graham red squirrel, an endangered subspecies of the American red squirrel that lost most of its habitat and population to the fire. According to a report published by the Arizona Game and Fish Department on October 17, 2017, the Mount Graham red squirrel's population had been reduced from 252 squirrels in 2016 to 35 squirrels. The Mount Graham red squirrel was expected to go extinct in 2017 because of this decimation, loss of habitat, predation, and competition with other squirrel species. Following efforts to restore its habitat in 2018, the population of Mount Graham red squirrels rose to 67. As of December 2022, the Mount Graham red squirrel has still not recovered to its pre-Frye Fire population.
