= Empire Ranch =

United States historic place in Pima County, Arizona

- U.S. National Register of Historic Places
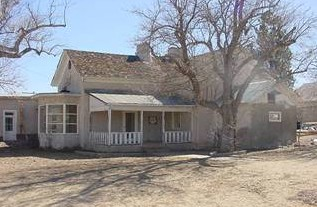
- The Empire Ranch headquarters.

- Location within Arizona Location within the United States
- Location: Las Cienegas, Arizona, United States
- Coordinates: 31°47′07″N 110°38′32″W
- Built: c.1871
- NRHP reference No.: 75000354
- Added to NRHP: 1976

Empire Ranch is a working cattle ranch in southeastern Pima County, Arizona, that was placed on the National Register of Historic Places in 1976. In its heyday, Empire Ranch was one of the largest in Arizona, with a range spanning over 180 square miles (470 km^{2}), and its owner, Walter L. Vail, was an important figure in the establishment of southern Arizona's cattle industry. It is currently owned by the Bureau of Land Management with a grazing lease to a private operator.

== History ==
=== Establishment ===
Empire Ranch is located on the eastern slope of the Santa Rita Mountains in Cienega Valley, fifty-two miles southeast of Tucson and about 10 miles (16 km) north of Sonoita. The property overlooks a shallow depression called Empire Gulch, through which a spring-fed rivulet bordered by cottonwoods courses eastward to Cienega Creek. The surrounding meadows are "thickly covered" with sacaton and salt grass. Tucson businessman Edward Nye Fish first occupied the site of the ranch in 1871, but it is uncertain whether or not he built the original four-room adobe house and corral, which may have already been there when he arrived.

On August 22, 1876, an Easterner named Walter Vail and his English business partner, Herbert R. Hislop, purchased Empire Ranch and its 612 head of cattle from Fish and his partner, Simon Silverberg, who had acquired the 160-acre tract only two months earlier from Fish's brother-in-law, William Wakefield, at a price of $500. Fish and Silverberg wanted $3,800 for the ranch and cattle; but to expedite the sale, they settled on a considerably lower price of $1,174. Vail and Hislop immediately began expanding their holdings in the area by acquiring new lands and improving the ranch's infrastructure. In its heyday, Empire controlled 180 square miles (470 km^{2}) of rangeland between the Santa Rita, Rincon, Whetstone, and Huachuca Mountains.

When Walter's wife, Margaret, arrived from New Jersey in the summer of 1881, Vail undertook a variety of improvements on the ranch house. Up to that time, Walter had added only a kitchen, pantry, cook's room, and business office to the original four-room structure – just enough to accommodate the cowboys who worked on the ranch. Shortly after Margaret's arrival, Walter built her an eight-room addition to the earlier dwelling, including two bedrooms, a living room, a dining area and a covered porch. The imposing structure boasted 12 feet (3.7 m) high ceilings, three stone fireplaces for heating, and a fashionable half-hexagon bay window opening off the living room. The Empire Ranch house became a showplace ranch house in southern Arizona. The red-shingled adobe building proved so attractive that, contrary to the common practice among territorial ranch families, Margaret chose to live on the ranch instead of a separate residence in Tucson. More rooms were added as the years went on, resulting in the current twenty-two room house that is preserved today.

The origin of the name Empire Ranch remains unclear. Walter's brother, Edward, said that Walter renamed the Fish holdings after acquiring the property in 1876, claiming "he would make an Empire of it someday." However, in writing to his sister on November 25, 1876, Herbert Hislop stated: " ...it was called the Empire Ranch before we bought it and we have not altered the name." Other accounts suggest that either Fish called the quarter-section spread "the Empire" in a promotional flurry to make it more attractive, or that William Wakefield named the ranch after the nearby Empire Mountains. The evidence weighs against Edward Vail's romanticized version.

Vail and Hislop hoped to increase their herd of cattle to about five thousand head. To underwrite expansion and help meet their debts, they took in a third partner in October 1876. Another Englishman, John H. Harvey, had heard about the ranch through Walter's uncle, Nathan. Nathan Vail had been a friend and one-time business partner of Harvey's uncle in England. Learning that John Harvey had money to invest, Nathan had encouraged him to visit Tucson and the Empire Ranch, which he did in the early weeks of October. The wealthy Englishman, although inexperienced at ranching, saw strong potential for the small ranching venture and joined the partnership. The firm changed its name to Vail, Hislop, and Harvey. The neighboring cattlemen called them the "English Boys' Outfit." To keep pace with its new identity, the Empire changed horse brands from "V" to "VH," but kept the familiar heart-shaped brand for the cattle.

=== Apaches ===
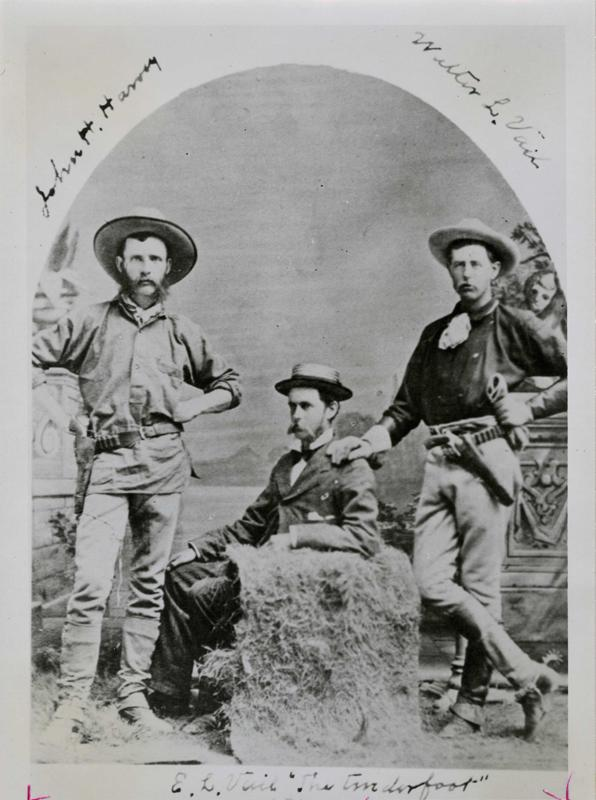
John H. Harvey (left), Edward L. Vail (center), and Walter L. Vail (right) in 1879.

Indian raids were an ever-present threat, and nearby ranches stopped operation. The Empire, however, remained to fight for their land and their horses (which were considered the prize to the Indians). In the earliest years, hostile Apaches were an ever-present threat to the ranching operations. The Chiricahua Apaches, who had been moved to the San Carlos Indian Reservation in June 1876, became restless and fled south to their old haunts in the Whetstone and Chiricahua Mountains. Roving bands raided ranches throughout the Cienega Valley, escaping to the nearby hills with a prized haul of horses. Ranchers who sought to retrieve their stack often came back empty-handed, or failed to return at all. In the face of increasing raids, several ranchers near the Empire abandoned their holdings and moved to Tucson. Vail and Hislop, however, were willing to "shoot the renegades on sight."

The ranch's isolation and its herd of workhorses made it a likely target for attack. The ranch lay a full day's ride by horseback from Tucson. The only major ranch in the vicinity was Don Sanford's Stock Valley Ranch, located 5 miles (8 km) northeast. Vail and Hislop knew that help would not be forthcoming in the event of a raid. The horses had to be constantly guarded. During the day, the riding stock, which numbered nine saddle horses, twenty brood mares, and twelve colts, grazed in a large fenced-in pasture 600 feet (200 m) from the ranch house. At night they corralled their stock in an adobe enclosure attached to the house. The possibility of a devastating loss of riding stock remained foremost in their thoughts, as Hislop reflected: "How long we shall keep them out of Apaches' hands I do not know, as I suspect we being the only owners of any number of horses around here, that they will pay us a visit."

The Indian activity prompted the United States Army to take action. Writing to his brother, Edward Vail, on January 20, 1876, Walter reported that "this last outbreak has made so much talk that the Government is going to establish a fort 25 miles (40 km) south of our place, which I hope will put a stop to Indian trouble in this part of the country." As anticipated, the army established Camp Huachuca on March 3, 1877. However, the camp was too distant to provide protection for the Cienega Valley. Vail and his partners refused to be terrorized by the Apaches. They instructed their cowboys to ride the range well-armed and never alone. Even when renegades were reported in the vicinity the cattlemen would not curtail ranch activities. As Edward Vail related: "... the Indians were supposed to be out, but we never stayed home on that account, as it was necessary to keep working."

The youthful cattlemen did not suffer greatly from the Apaches. They struck repeatedly in the vicinity but made off with only two horses of the "VH" brand. In a series of raids between August 1876 and February 1877, they stole several herds of livestock and killed three cowboys immediately south of the ranch, but each time skirted around the property. Yet not until Geronimo's renegades surrendered to General Nelson A. Miles on September 4, 1886, did the owners of Empire Ranch completely relax.

An opportunity to build the Empire herd came in January 1877. The three cattlemen, hoping to avoid the expense and trouble of driving herds from distant ranges, had made inquiries about other cattle in southern Arizona. In the latter part of January, they learned that S. S. "Yankee" Miller, foreman for John Chisum's ranch on the San Pedro River near St. David, had driven a large herd of Durhams, Herefords, and longhorns from New Mexico to the vicinity of Benson. Vail visited Miller at his Benson encampment and purchased 793 cattle at fourteen dollars per head. In the same exchange, Vail disposed of 620 sheep that he had previously bought from his neighbor, Henry M. Kemp. The flock had been a constant nuisance; and Vail gladly parted with them, even at a loss of forty cents per head.

The transaction was not without incident, though. Before Vail could remove the herd, a band of Chiricahua Apaches silently approached Miller's compound and crept away with all their horses under cover of darkness. Vail awoke before dawn to discover the loss. Several of the trail crew set out on foot to pursue the thieves south to the Whetstone Mountains but en route dropped the plan for fear the Apaches might outnumber them in their mountain stronghold. They went back by Empire Ranch and picked up enough horses to enable them to safely drive the cattle from the Chisum range to the ranch. In this incident, the Empire's closest scrape with Apaches, Vail had been fortunate; he had lost only one horse, none of the cattle, and no one had been hurt.

=== Sheep ===
In the late spring of 1877, Vail, Hislop, and Harvey decided to introduce better bred beeves into their herd. In April, Walter Vail rode east with Miller and a Chisum trail outfit to John Chisum's Long Rail Ranch on the Pecos River in New Mexico. Here, Vail purchased forty Durham bulls from Chisum, but injured his knee before he could start back to Arizona. Leaving the cattle, he went to a cousin's home in Netawaka, Kansas, and spent five painful months recuperating. In the fall, Vail and several Chisum trailhands drove the blooded bulls through Apache-controlled territory to the Empire Ranch.

During Vail's absence, Hislop and Harvey had trouble with a sheepherder settling adjacent to Empire Ranch. The neighbor refused to contain his flock on his own range and arrogantly drove them onto the ranchland to water. When the sheep crowded along Cienega Creek, cattle were forced to scatter and move away from the water. The situation infuriated Hislop, who warned the trespasser to stay clear of their land or they would stampede his sheep. The sheepman ignored Hislop's warnings, and the prospect of range warfare loomed.

On February 4, 1878, Hislop wrote the following in a letter to his sister:

... it seems to me nothing but trouble the whole time, how things are going to turn out time alone will prove. I only hope that no shooting will occur... but I do not intend to talk to him again on the subject of his sheep. My partner Vail has just returned ... and is very hostile on the subject. I think it needs an American to talk to another American and he means war to the knife.

Although the dispute never erupted into conflict, it was a decisive factor in Hislop's decision to give up ranching and return to England. By March 1878, he became annoyed at Vail and Harvey's reluctance to market livestock and recoup their initial investment costs. The partners wanted to delay sales until their herds had produced several calf crops. The troublesome neighbor only reinforced Hislop's distaste for the entire ranching venture. Vail urged him to reconsider, but Hislop would not be swayed. Walter borrowed $6,850 from his Aunt Anna, Nathan's wife, and bought Hislop's interest in the ranch. Upon his departure, Hislop announced that he would never return to "this bloody country again."

Within a year of Hislops departure, Vail and Harvey welcomed a new partner, Walter's older brother Edward. Edward "Ned" Vail had corresponded with Walter since 1876 and shared his brother's belief that the cattle trade would soon be a large and prosperous industry in Arizona. Ned had been brought up on the family farm in New Jersey and then worked seven years in a ship chandler's store in New York City. Like Walter, Ned had no experience with cattle when he arrived at Empire Ranch on May 14, 1879. Walter immediately put his brother to work on the range, thereby forcing Edward to acquire a cattleman's skill and "carry his weight" at the ranch.

=== Total Wreck ===
While Walter and his partners were readying their first cattle for market, a silver discovery was made near Empire Ranch which vitally affected its destiny. In January 1879, an itinerant prospector named John T. Dillon, located three mining claims on the boulder-strewn eastern slope of the Empire Mountains. "The whole damned hill is a total wreck," Dillon remarked to co-claimants Walter L. Vail and John A. Harvey. Vail and Harvey liked the description and christened one of the three sites the "Total Wreck." Legal entanglements prevented immediate exploitation of the claim; but when the court re-affirmed their title, the owners incorporated the operation as the Total Wreck Mining and Milling Company.

In 1881, Walter and Nathan Vail secured full control of the corporation, sold shares of the company in New York City, and launched a large-scale development at the Total Wreck. Two years later, its production rivaled that of the most prosperous mines in Arizona Territory. However, the depression in silver prices in 1884 crippled the operation, and the Vails closed it three years later when ore yields fell too low for profit. Although the Total Wreck prospered for only a brief period, it produced over $500,000 in revenue, which contributed significantly to the expansion and development of Empire Ranch.

=== Later years ===
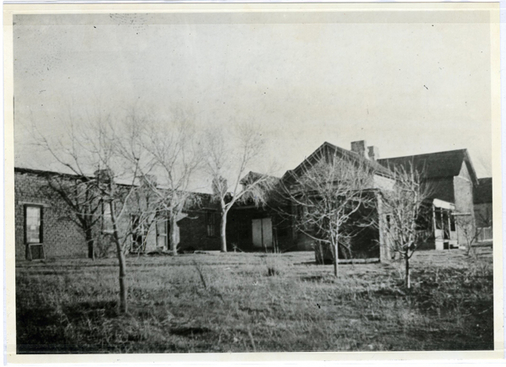
The Empire Ranch house, c.1900.

In 1886, the ranch was incorporated as the Empire Land and Cattle Company, with California entrepreneur Carroll W. Gates buying half-interest in 1889. The Empire management searched out new markets in Kansas City and Los Angeles when the home market collapsed in the mid-1880s. Vail and Gates bought or leased additional grasslands in Texas, Oklahoma, Kansas, and California during drought years of the early nineties. While furthering his own business, Vail argued prominently for cattlemen's interests as a legislator, county supervisor, and president of the Livestock Ranchman's Association.

By 1898, the Vails had nearly forty thousand cattle, most of which were Herefords, on their combined ranges. Vail and Gates converted the home ranch fully to "breeder-feeder" operations, with Arizona-bred cattle shipped outside the territory to fatten. Beginning in 1902, they siphoned corporate assets into lucrative real estate, horse raising, and resort investments on the West Coast. For a time, California endeavors profited Vail and Gates more so than the Arizona ranch. Although Walter Vail died in 1906, his heirs operated Empire Ranch by the same, successful principles Walter had used, until its final sale to the Boice, Gates and Johnston company in 1928.

By 1951, Frank Boice and his family assumed full control of the property. Around the same time, the ranch was featured in several Western films starring many of Hollywood's most famous actors, such as John Wayne, Gregory Peck and Steve McQueen. In 1969, Empire Ranch was sold to the Gulf American Corporation for a proposed real estate development and later resold to the Anamax Mining Company for mining and water potential. None of these developments materialized, and the ranch continues to work with cattle. In the 1980s, the owners began to restore the buildings to their original state and in 1988 the ranch became public land administered by the Bureau of Land Management (BLM). The Empire Ranch Foundation was established as a private non-profit organization in 1997 to work with the BLM to develop private support to preserve the buildings and enhance the educational and recreational opportunities it offers to the public. In 2000, Congress combined Empire Ranch and the surrounding ranchland with the Las Cienegas National Conservation Area. The Vera Earl Ranch assumed the grazing lease on the Empire Ranch in 2008.

On April 25–26, 2017, the Sawmill Fire, which had been started two days earlier by a gender reveal party, significantly impacted the Empire Ranch, though fortunately its historic buildings were not damaged by the flames thanks to the efforts of firefighters. During the incident, the fire came as close as 50 feet to the buildings.

== Gallery ==
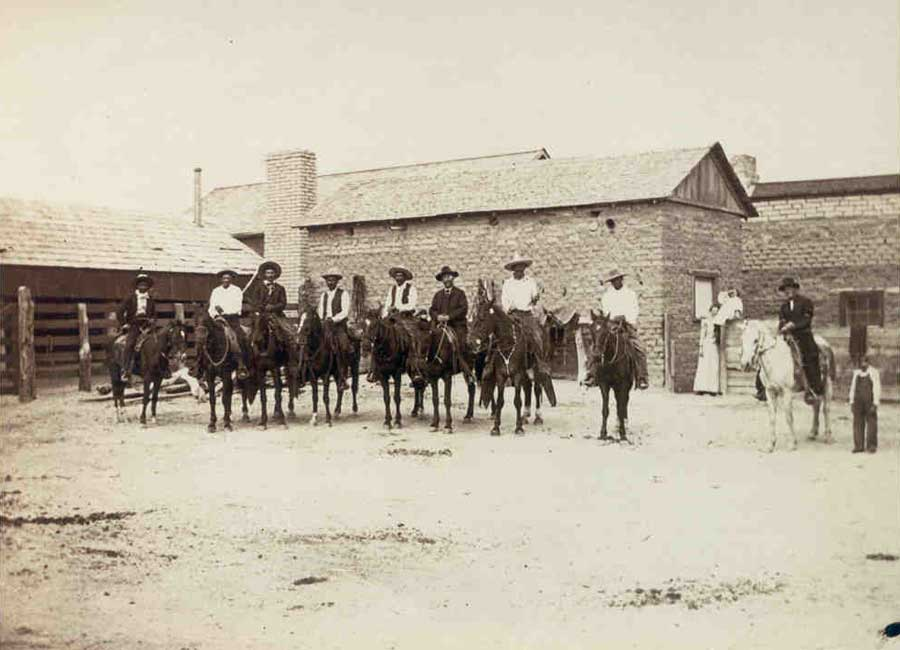
Vaqueros at Empire Ranch, c.1890.

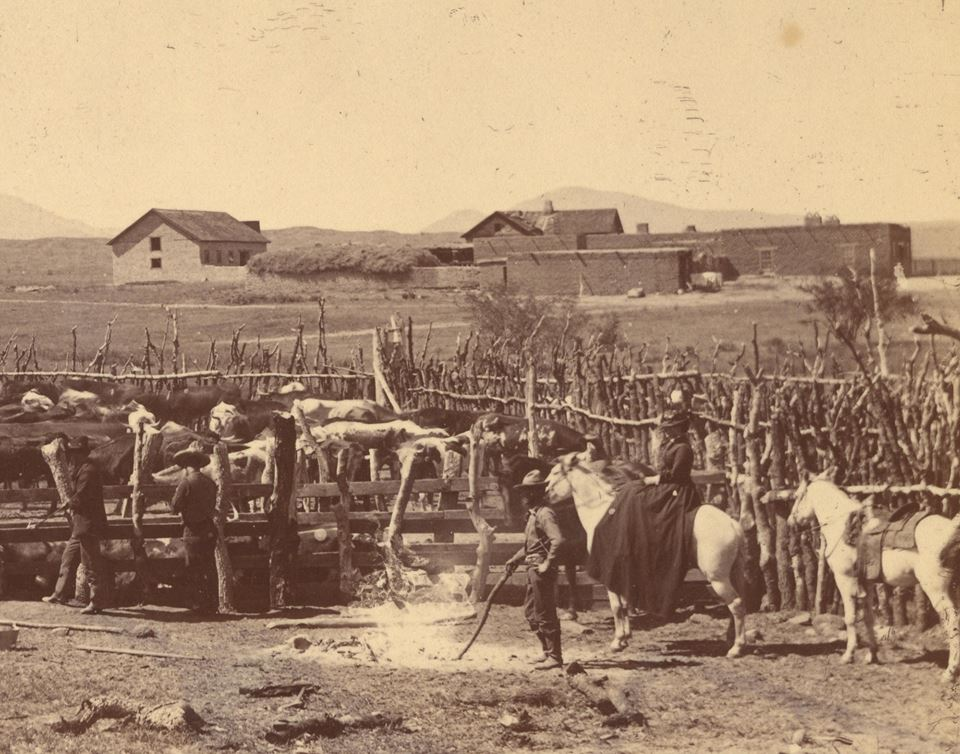
Empire Ranch in the 1890s.

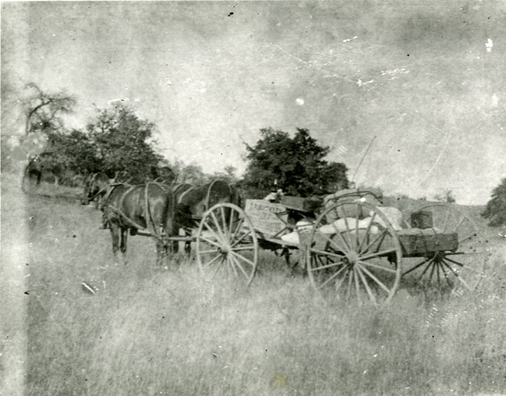
Two horses and a buckboard at Empire Ranch, c.1899.

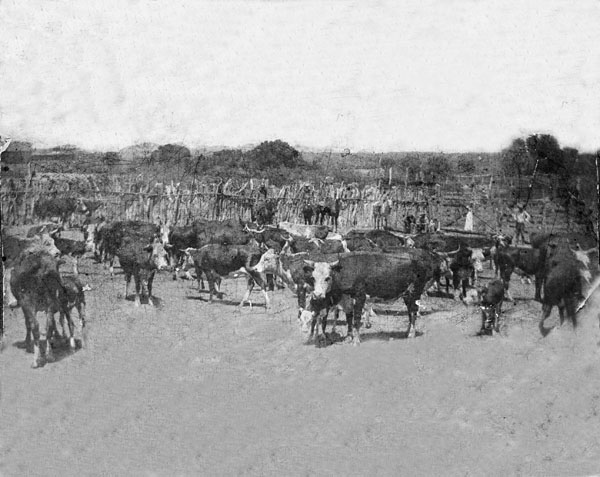
Cattle at Empire Ranch, c.1900.

== See also ==
- Aztec Land & Cattle Company
- National Register of Historic Places listings in Pima County, Arizona
- Pantano, Arizona
- Vail, Arizona
- Vail Ranch
