= Kendrick Peak =

Mountain in Arizona

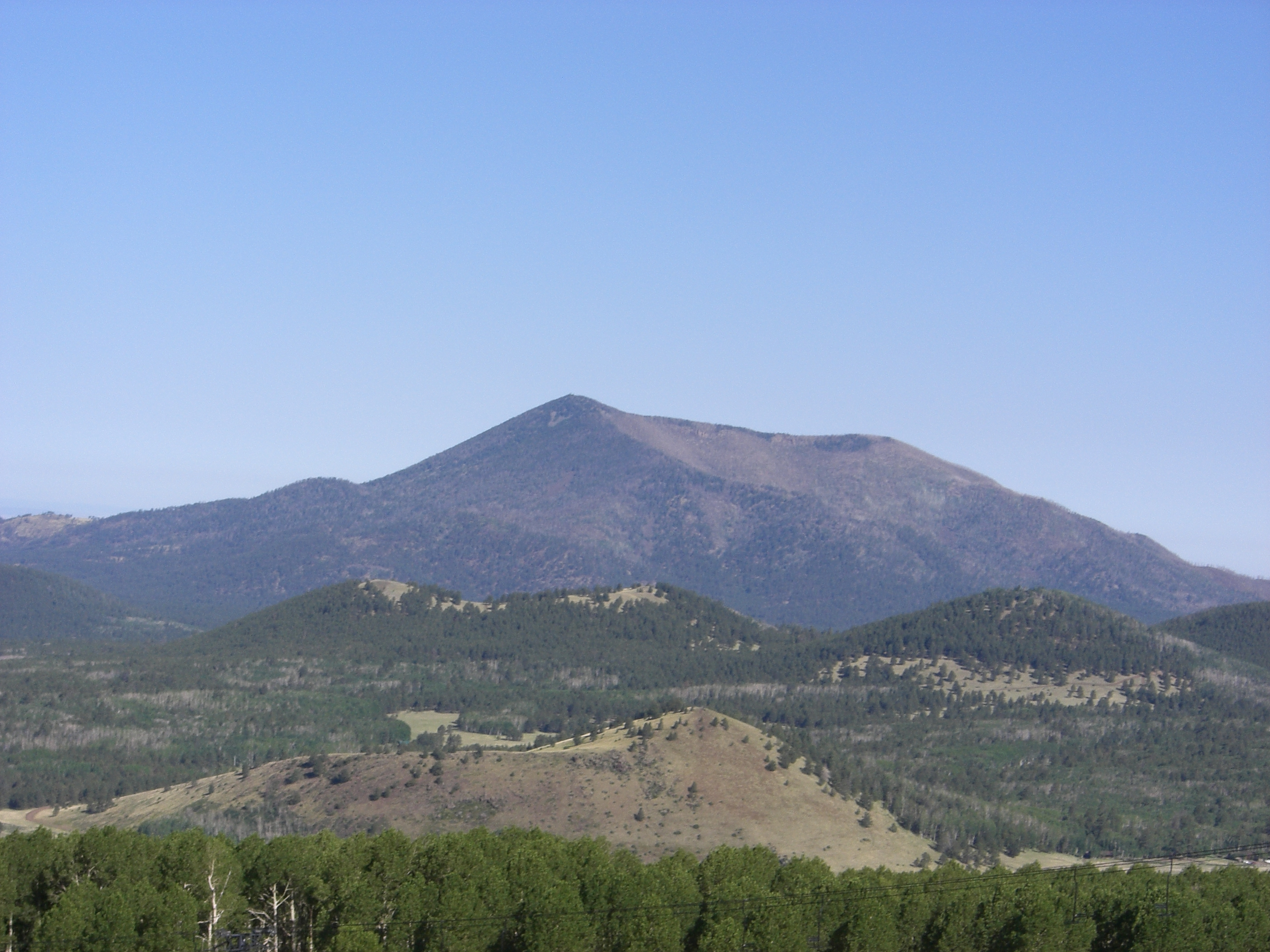
- Kendrick Peak as seen from the San Francisco Peaks

Highest point
- Elevation: 10,425 ft (3,178 m) NAVD 88
- Prominence: 2,478 ft (755 m)
- Coordinates: 35°24′29″N 111°51′03″W

Geography
- Location within Arizona
- Location: Coconino County, Arizona, U.S.
- Topo map: USGS Kendrick Peak

Geology
- Mountain type: Lava dome
- Rock types: Dacite and rhyolite
- Volcanic field: San Francisco volcanic field
- Last eruption: 1.4 million years ago

Climbing
- Easiest route: Kendrick Peak Trail

Kendrick Peak or Kendrick Mountain is one of the highest peaks in the San Francisco volcanic field north of the city of Flagstaff in the U.S. state of Arizona and is located on the Coconino Plateau in Coconino County.

Kendrick Peak rises to a height of 10,425 feet (3,178 m), which makes it the 11th or 12th tallest summit (depending on the source) in Arizona. Kendrick Peak is a lava dome between 2.7 and 1.4 million years old consisting primarily of dacite and rhyolite flows that were partly buried by andesite according to the USGS.

Kendrick Peak is in the Kendrick Mountain Wilderness which is administered jointly by the Kaibab National Forest and the Coconino National Forest. A fire lookout, staffed by the United States Forest Service during the week and by volunteers on the weekends, has stood on top of Kendrick Peak since the early 1900s.

There are three maintained trails to the summit of Kendrick Peak—Kendrick Mountain Trail, Pumpkin Trail and Bull Basin Trail.

In the year 2000, the Kendrick Wilderness and Kendrick Peak were involved in a large wildfire, the results of which as of 2026 are still quite evident to hikers or visitors to the peak. In an effort to return the forest to its "pre-fire" state, cattle are sometimes grazed near the Kendrick Mountain Trail trailhead. In 2017, the Boundary Fire started after lightning struck the northeast side of Kendrick Peak.

== Geology ==
Kendrick Peak is a dome volcano, with some having multiple extrusion vents. Other Arizona examples of dome volcanoes are Mount Elden, Bill Williams Mountain, and Sitgreaves Mountain. See List of lava domes for more examples worldwide.

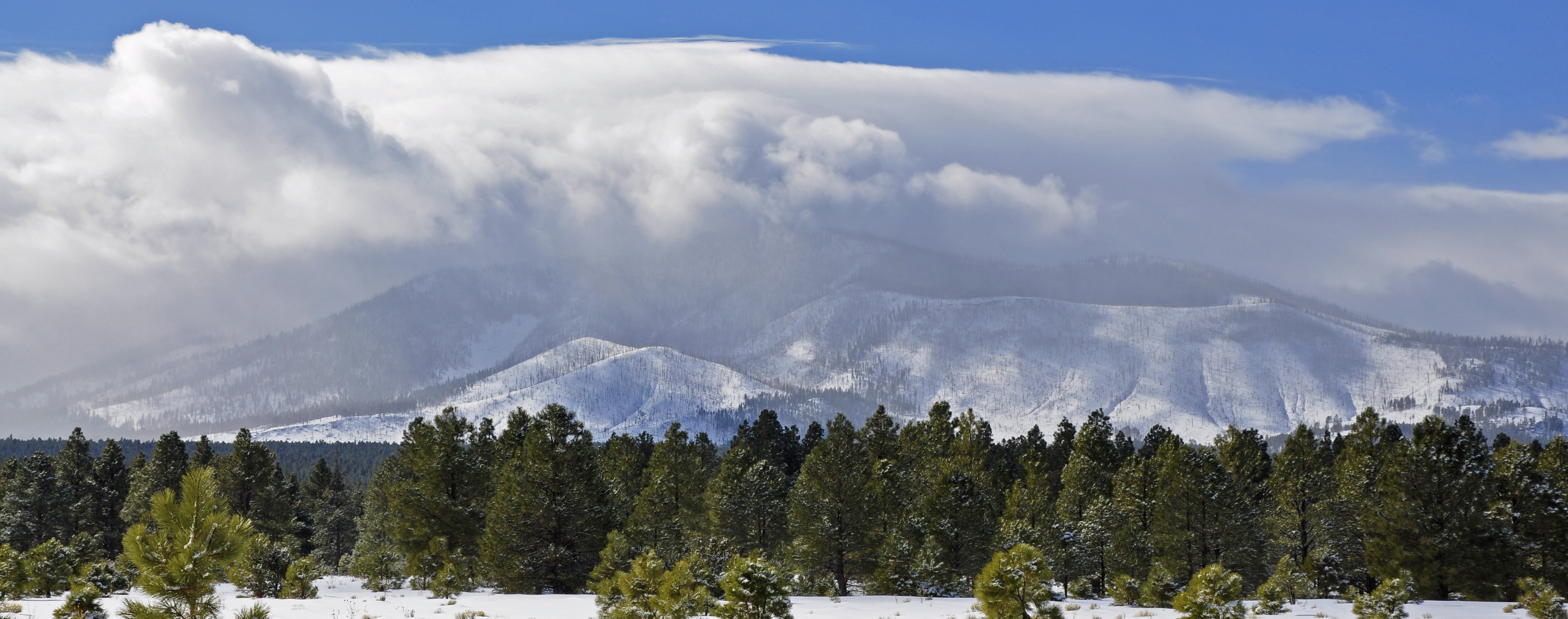
Snow clouds over Kendrick Mountain
