= Boundary Fire (2017) =

Wildfire in Arizona, United States

- Part of the 2017 Arizona wildfires
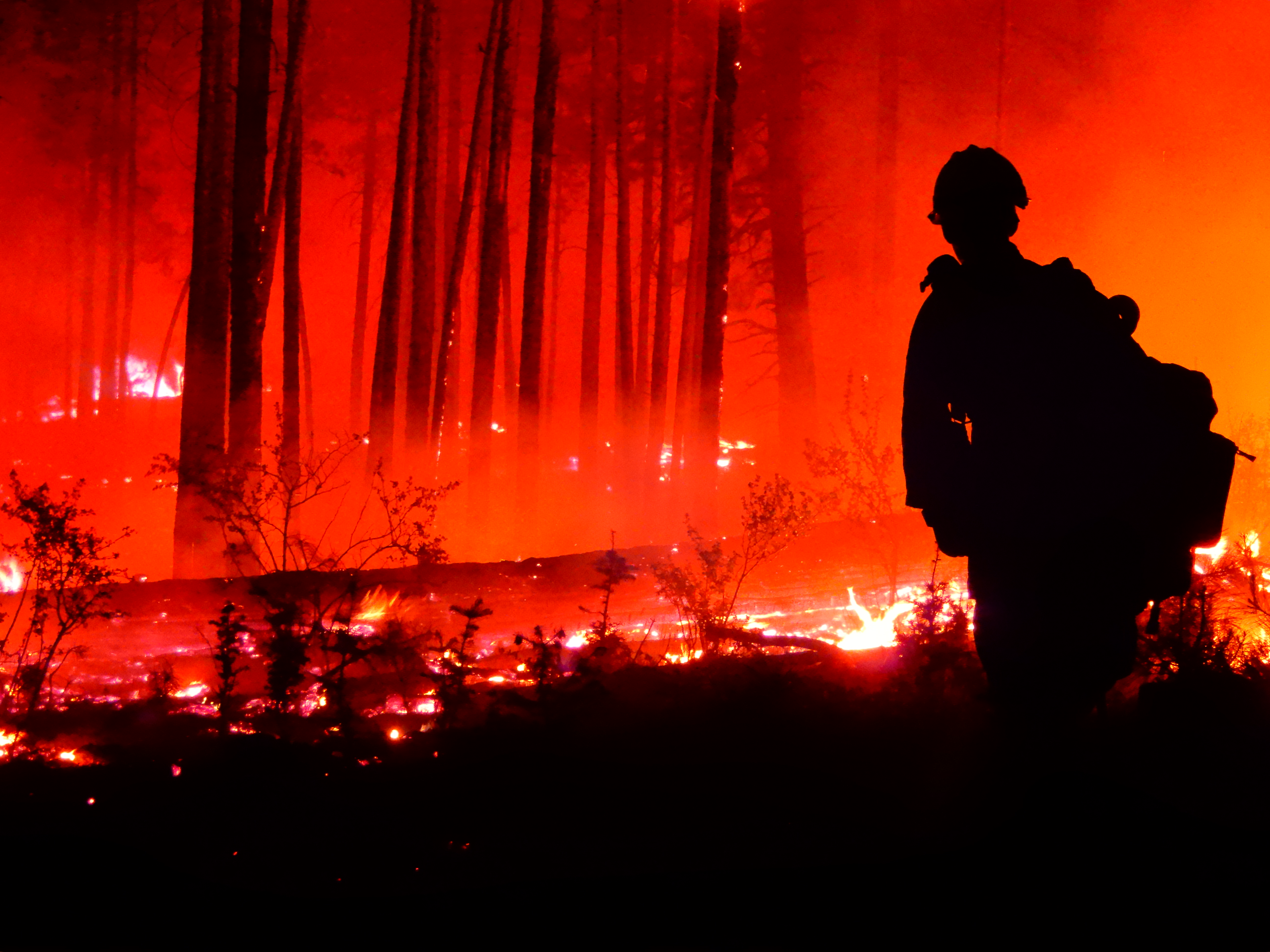
- Firefighter watching the Boundary Fire, June 17, 2017
- Date: June 1, 2017 –; July 3, 2017; (33 days)
- Location: Coconino and Kaibab National Forests, Arizona, United States
- Coordinates: 35.432°N 111.831°W

Statistics
- Burned area: 17,788 acres (71.99 km^{2}; 27.794 sq mi)

Impacts
- Cost: $9.4 million (equivalent to $11.8 million in 2024)

Ignition
- Cause: Lightning

Map
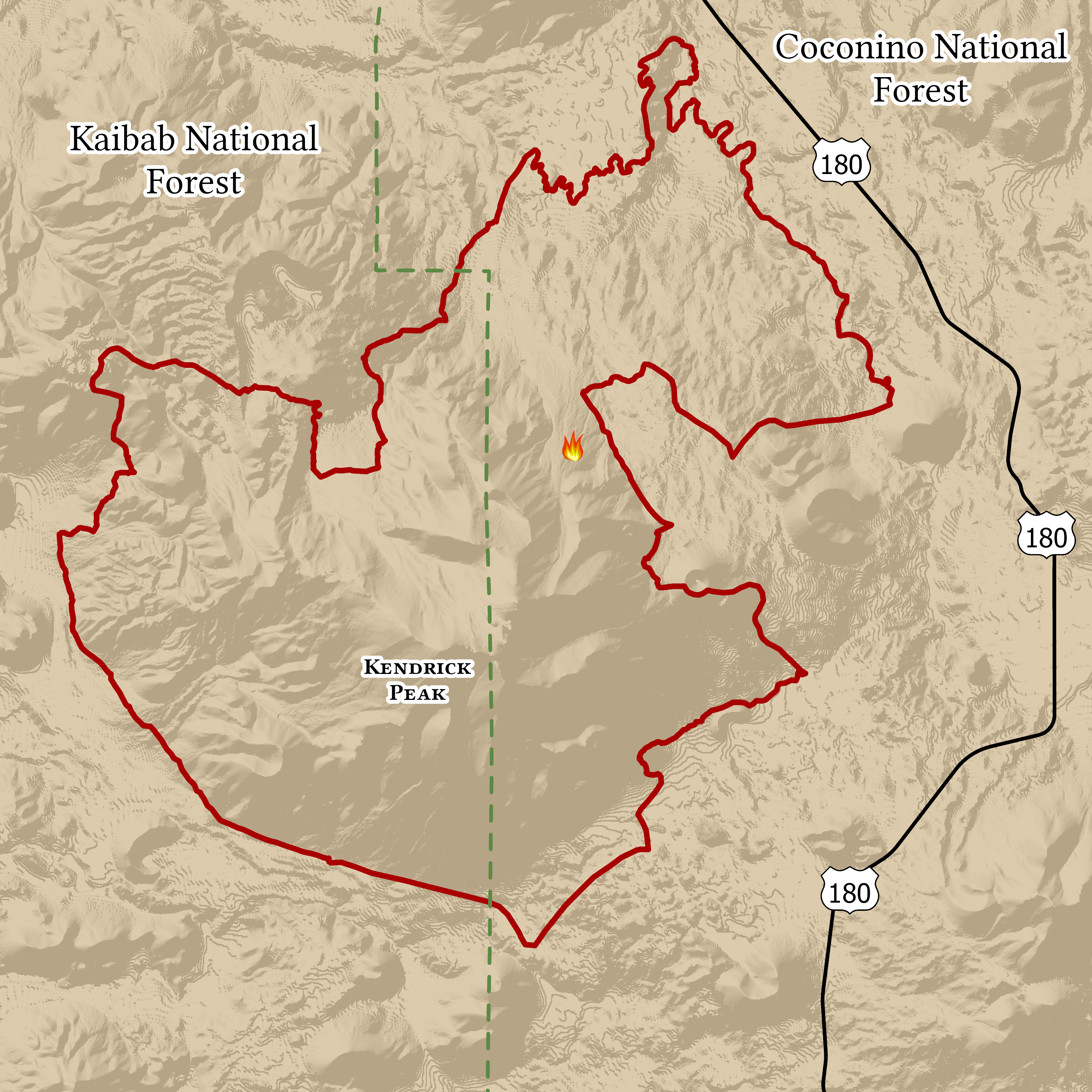
- Footprint of the Boundary Fire, from the National Interagency Fire Center

- The location of the Boundary Fire, in northern Arizona

The Boundary Fire was a 2017 wildfire in Arizona that burned 17,788 acres (7,199 ha) of the Coconino and Kaibab National Forests. The fire was ignited on June 1 when lightning struck a spot on the northeast side of Kendrick Peak within the Coconino National Forest. The fire spread rapidly because of high temperatures, steep terrain, leftover dead trees from a wildfire in 2000, and high wind speeds.

The winds blew smoke over local communities and infrastructure, leading to the closure of U.S. Route 180 from June 8 to June 21. Smoke was also visible from the Grand Canyon. The Boundary Fire burned out on July 3, 2017, after 32 days of firefighting. The cost of managing the fire was $9.4 million (equivalent to $11.8 million in 2024). Damage to the area's foliage increased the risk of landslides into 2018.

== Background ==
Wildfires are a natural part of the ecological cycle of the Southwestern United States, but human-induced climate change has caused them to increase in number, destructiveness, duration, and frequency. Fire suppression efforts can also have the contradictory effect of worsening the effects of fires that do occur. The Boundary Fire was one of 2,321 wildfires that burned 429,564 acres (173,838 ha) in Arizona in 2017. In a report released in April 2017, about a month before the fire, Arizona State Forester Jeff Whitney expected a typical season in the state's northern forests but one with high fire potential in the state's southern grasslands because of high temperatures, low humidity, and an abundance of fuels. Temperatures in Arizona were higher than usual through the 2017 season; on July 4, the National Weather Service stated that that year's June was the fifth-hottest recorded in the city of Flagstaff, which sits between the Coconino and Kaibab National Forests. According to the Arizona Department of Health Services, Flagstaff recorded temperatures of up to 93 °F (34 °C) between June 12 and June 27. By August, wildfires had burned the most land since the 2011 season.

== Progression ==
The Boundary Fire was sparked when lightning struck the northeast slope of Kendrick Peak, within Coconino National Forest, at about 2:02 pm on June 1, 2017. The fire grew to 380 acres (150 ha) by June 6. Owing to the danger posed to firefighters by difficult terrain and leftover dead trees from the Pumpkin Fire in 2000, the United States Forest Service (USFS) decided to confine the Boundary Fire to a 15,000-acre (6,100 ha) area around the mountain and allow it to burn out naturally. Firefighters began creating firebreaks along roads in the area on June 6, especially to the west of the fire. On June 8, high winds fanned the fire over the firebreaks to its north and towards U.S. Route 180 (US 180), 2 mi (3.2 km) from the fire at that time. That night, fire managers closed US 180 as firefighters monitored the fire's spread. Smoke from the Boundary Fire drifted into communities surrounding the fire, such as Flagstaff, and was visible from the Grand Canyon, approximately 65 mi (105 km) north of Flagstaff.

By June 9, the Boundary Fire had grown to 1,550 acres (630 ha) and was burning along US 180 and within both Coconino and Kaibab National Forests. Fanned by strong winds on June 10 and 11, the fire swelled to 4,420 acres (1,790 ha) and was being managed by 261 firefighters. After June 12, reduced winds enabled the USFS to use aerial ignition, a form of controlled burn, to spread the fire uphill more quickly, reducing the damage to the soil from the fire. By June 14, the fire had grown to 5,784 acres (2,341 ha) and was being managed by almost 500 firefighters with aerial firefighting assets. Low wind speeds allowed ground crews and aerial assets to continue with controlled burns from June 15 to June 19, ahead of forecasted high temperatures in the following days. By June 19, the fire had burned 8,067 acres (3,265 ha). The next day brought light rain, cloud cover, and a higher humidity, which caused the fire to burn lower to the ground and consume detritus rather than foliage. Firefighters were able to secure fire breaks and private property, increasing the portion of the fire that was contained from 18% to 30%.

The visibility along US 180 had improved enough by June 21 to allow the Arizona Department of Transportation to reopen the road with reduced speed limits. On June 22, firefighters raised containment of the Boundary Fire to 42 percent despite high winds and temperatures that fanned it to 11,540 acres (4,670 ha). On June 23, the USFS stated that it believed the area closed by the fire could expand to 18,000 acres (7,300 ha), but made progress in containing its spread. By June 25, the fire had grown to 17,049 acres (6,899 ha) but was 88 percent contained, and temperatures dipped to 88 °F (31 °C). Aerial firefighting assets were temporarily grounded on June 25 because a civilian drone flew over the fire. The fire burned out on July 3.

== Aftermath ==
The Boundary Fire burned 17,788 acres (7,199 ha) over 32 days and cost $9.4 million (equivalent to $11.8 million in 2024) to suppress. Of the total area burned, three percent suffered total foliage mortality. No structures were damaged or destroyed. Four evacuated civilians suffered injuries related to the fire. Almost 500 firefighters worked to contain and suppress the Boundary Fire at its height. Due to the smoke from the Boundary Fire and plans for a later prescribed burn, the USFS decided to quickly suppress the Government Fire when it ignited "a few miles away" in the same season.

=== Environmental consequences ===
Trails on Kendrick Peak did not reopen until September 14, 2017, because of the potential for landslides caused by heavy rains brought by the North American monsoon. The Kaibab National Forest Supervisor stated that the closure was prolonged to "allow the landscape to stabilize during the immediate post-fire period", particularly with the added monsoon conditions. Forest Road 149, near Kendrick Peak, was closed again in July 2018 because the area was at risk for landslides, as stabilizing foliage growth after the Boundary Fire had been slow in that area.

The base camp for fighting the Boundary Fire was located at a nearby fairground. When the National Renewable Energy Laboratory (NREL) visited the site for an audit on June 19, 2017, the camp was consuming 106 US gallons (400 L) of diesel fuel per day for lighting, electricity, and food preservation, as well as 2,250 US gallons (8,500 L) of water. The audit also found that 5% of the waste was recycled and all of the batteries were single-use.
