= 2017 Arizona wildfires =

Natural disasters in the USA

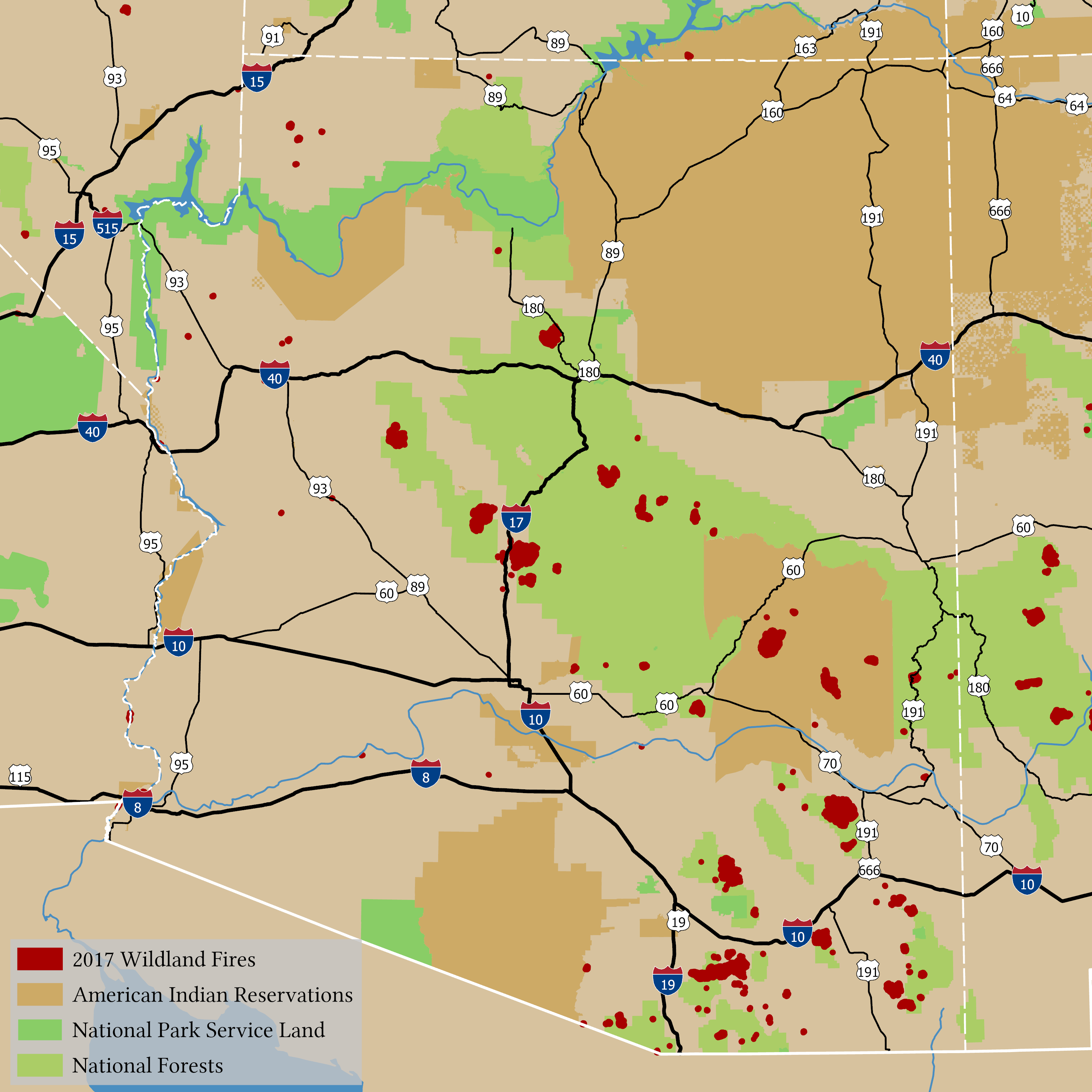
- Areas that burned in wildfires in Arizona in 2017 are colored maroon

Statistics
- Total area: 412,672 acres (167,002 hectares)

Impacts
- Cost: Unknown

Wildfires in 2017 in the U.S. state of Arizona burned 412,672 acres (167,002 ha), greater than the average annual burned acreage during the previous 10 years.

== Background ==
Wildfires are both a hazard to life and property and a necessary component of the ecology of the Southwestern United States.

In 2017, Arizona experienced lower than normal winter precipitation, higher than normal temperatures, and a delayed-onset monsoon. These climate and weather conditions contributed to wildfire growth in the state.

== List of wildfires ==
The below is a list of notable wildfires in Arizona in 2017.

Name	County	Acres (ha)	Start date	Containment date	Notes	Maps	Ref(s)
Ranch		2,466 (998)	March 11	March 13	Human cause		
Sawmill	Graham	46,991 (19,017)	April 23	April 30	Human cause		
Mulberry		1,755 (710)	May 6	May 9	Unknown cause		
Pinal		7,193 (2,911)	May 8	August 11	Caused by lightning		
Dove		14,000 (5,700)	May 9	June 23	Caused by lightning		
Snake Ridge	Navajo	15,333 (6,205)	May 19	July 13	Caused by lightning		
Slim		3,241 (1,312)	June 1	June 15	Caused by lightning		
Bear		2,591 (1,049)	June 1	June 16	Caused by lightning		
Boundary	Coconino	17,788 (7,199)	June 1	July 3	Caused by lightning		
Freeze 2		2,829 (1,145)	June 1	July 13	Caused by lightning		
Smith		1,796 (727)	June 7	June 8	Unknown cause		
Paige Creek		1,064 (431)	June 7	June 12	Caused by lightning		
Bowie		3,015 (1,220)	June 7	June 13	Unknown cause		
Rucker		1,130 (460)	June 7	June 22	Caused by lightning		
Frye	Graham	48,433 (19,600)	June 7	September 1	Caused by lightning		
Lizard		15,230 (6,160)	June 7	June 22	Unknown cause		
Highline		7,198 (2,913)	June 10	July 20	Unknown cause		
Hilltop		33,826 (13,689)	June 12	August 12	Caused by lightning		
Flying R		2,270 (920)	June 14	June 16	Human cause		
Maggie		1,400 (570)	June 18	June 21	Unknown cause		
Encino		1,289 (522)	June 20	June 25	Unknown cause		
303		1,676 (678)	June 22	June 23	Unknown cause		
Bar X		2,755 (1,115)	June 21	June 26	Unknown cause		
Goodwin	Yavapai	28,516 (11,540)	June 24	July 10	Unknown cause		
Mink		1,024 (414)	June 25	July 1	Unknown cause		
Maynard		1,300 (530)	June 26	July 1	Caused by lightning		
Fraguita		2,400 (970)	June 26	July 1	Unknown cause		
Swisshelms		10,950 (4,430)	June 27	July 9	Unknown cause		
SH Creek		3,074 (1,244)	June 27	July 27	Caused by lightning		
Burro		27,238 (11,023)	June 30	July 20	Unknown cause		
Sheep		4,617 (1,868)	July 4	July 13	Unknown cause		
Brooklyn	Yavapai	33,550 (13,580)	July 7	July 27	Caused by lightning		
Bull		5,699 (2,306)	July 7	July 27	Caused by lightning		
Cedar		1,120 (450)	July 8	July 27	Caused by lightning		
Hyde		18,072 (7,313)	July 11	August 10	Caused by lightning		
Fife		1,436 (581)	July 12	July 14	Caused by lightning		
Davis		1,161 (470)	July 12	July 19	Unknown cause		
Pine Hollow		4,712 (1,907)	July 18	August 17	Caused by lightning		
33 Springs		1,878 (760)	October 6	October 24	Caused by lightning		
