= Snake Ridge Fire =

2017 wildfire in Arizona, USA

- Part of the 2017 Arizona wildfires
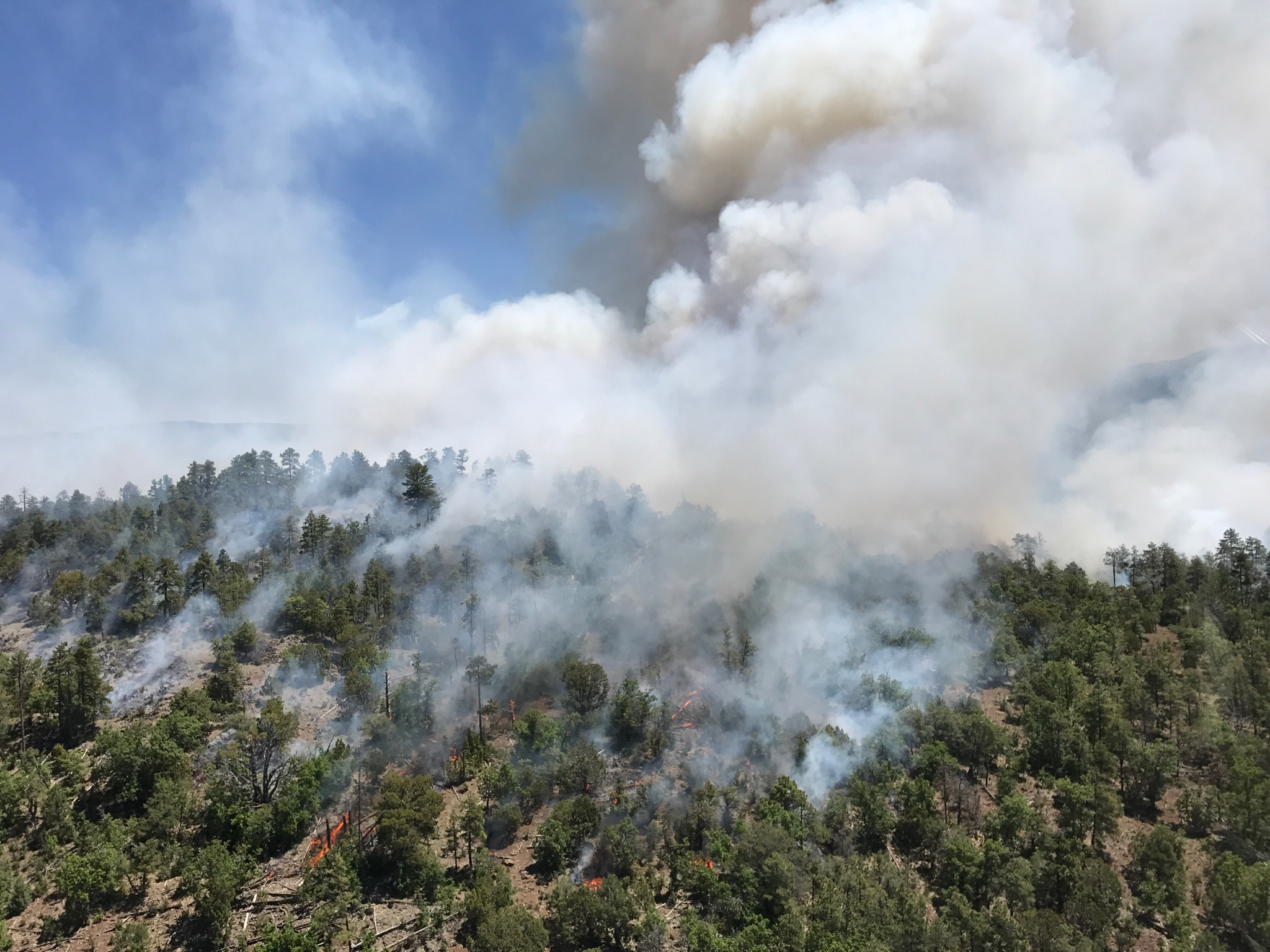
- Snake Ridge Fire burning on May 28, 2017
- Date: May 19 – July 13, 2017
- Location: Coconino National Forest, Arizona, United States
- Coordinates: 34.602°N 111.457°W

Statistics
- Burned area: 15,333 acres (62.05 km^{2}; 23.958 sq mi)

Impacts
- Cost: $1 million

Ignition
- Cause: Lightning

Map
- Location within Arizona Location within the United States

The Snake Ridge Fire was a wildfire that burned 15,333 acres (62.05 km^{2}) of the Coconino National Forest in the U.S. State of Arizona. The fire was ignited by a lightning strike on May 19, 2017, as the United States Forest Service (USFS) was conducting controlled burns within the Coconino National Forest to reduce the severity of future wildfires in the area. The USFS decided to manage the Snake Ridge Fire, named after the feature where the fire was ignited, as a controlled burn. Firefighting efforts focused on protecting infrastructure by burning fuels near power lines. These burns were completed on June 4 and the USFS subsequently allowed the fire, which had by this time been surrounded by firebreaks, to burn out. The fire was allowed to burn until July 13 and cost a total of $1 million to manage and contain. There were no serious environmental consequences as a result of the fire.

== Background ==
Wildfires are a natural part of the ecological cycle of the Southwestern United States. The Snake Ridge Fire was one of 2,321 wildfires that burned 429,564 acres (173,838 ha) in Arizona in 2017. Arizona State Forester Jeff Whitney expected a typical season in the state's northern forests but one with high fire potential in the state's southern grasslands because of high temperatures, low humidity, and an abundance of fuels. By August 2017, wildfires had burned the most land since the 2011 season.

== Fire ==
On May 1, 2017, the United States Forest Service (USFS) began conducting controlled burns in the Coconino National Forest to reduce fuel for potential wildfires and protect public utilities. At about 03:02 PM on May 19, lightning started a fire on the Snake Ridge, within the Coconino National Forest and was spotted within the day by the Baker Butte Lookout Tower. The USFS decided to manage the Snake Ridge Fire like a prescribed fire and allotted it an area of 55,000 acres (22,000 ha), which had already been designated for controlled burning. By May 23, the fire was burning on an area of 125 acres (51 ha) and firefighters focused on controlled burns of fuels around power lines. The first closure of areas adjacent to the fire was issued on May 24. This area was expanded to the north and east by May 27.

By May 27, the fire had grown to 4,850 acres (1,960 ha) and was being managed by 100 firefighters. Rainfall on May 30 slowed the growth of the Snake Ridge Fire to 8,200 acres (3,300 ha). To help it spread over rougher terrain, firefighters began using flammable materials dropped from helicopters on May 31. Although more than doubled in size to 11,189 acres (4,528 ha) the next day, the force managing the fire was halved as they continued to make controlled burns to protect power lines in the area. On June 4, those burns were completed and the USFS changed its strategy to containing and observing the fire for its remaining duration. The fire reached its greatest extent of 15,333 acres (6,205 ha) and was fully surrounded by firebreaks on June 5, and burned until July 13.

== Aftermath ==
The Snake Ridge Fire burned 15,333 acres (62.05 km^{2}) and cost $1,000,000 ($1.31 million, adjusted for inflation) to manage and suppress. Of the area the fire burned, only 2 percent—mostly in the north of the burn area—saw even 25 percent mortality of the local ponderosa pine forest canopy. No infrastructure within the burn area was damaged.

== See also ==
- Wildfires in 2017
