= Kendrick Mountain Wilderness =

Protected area in Coconino County, Arizona

- IUCN category Ib (wilderness area)
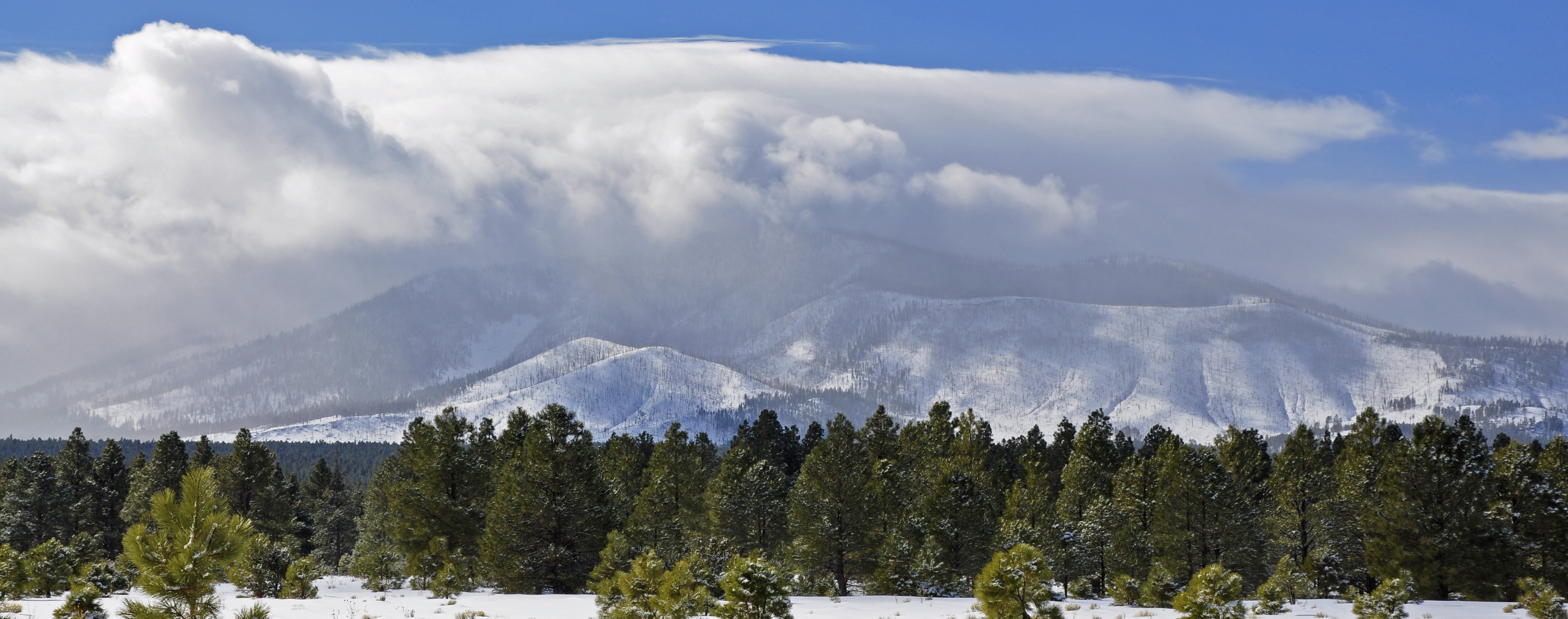
- Snow clouds over Kendrick Mountain

- Location within the United States
- Location: Coconino County, Arizona, U.S.
- Nearest city: Flagstaff, Arizona
- Coordinates: 35°24′49″N 111°51′16″W
- Area: 6,510 acres (26.3 km^{2})
- Established: 1984
- Governing body: Bureau of Land Management

Kendrick Mountain Wilderness is a 6,510-acre (26.3 km^{2}) wilderness area in the U.S. State of Arizona. It lies north of the city of Flagstaff on the Coconino Plateau in Coconino County. Kendrick Mountain Wilderness was designated a protected Wilderness area by Congress in 1984. About two thirds of the wilderness is contained within the Kaibab National Forest. Kendrick Mountain Wilderness contains 10,418-foot (3,175 m) Kendrick Peak, upon which a fire lookout has been located since the early 1900s.

In the year 2000 the Kendrick Wilderness and Kendrick Peak were substantially affected by a 15,000 acre (61 km^{2}) wildfire, known as the "Pumpkin Fire", the results of which are still quite evident to hikers or visitors to the peak. In an effort to return the forest to its "pre-fire" state, cattle are sometimes grazed near the Kendrick Mountain Trail trailhead.

== See also ==
- List of U.S. Wilderness Areas
- List of Arizona Wilderness Areas
