= Sawmill Fire (2017) =

2017 wildfire in Arizona, USA

- Part of the 2017 Arizona wildfires
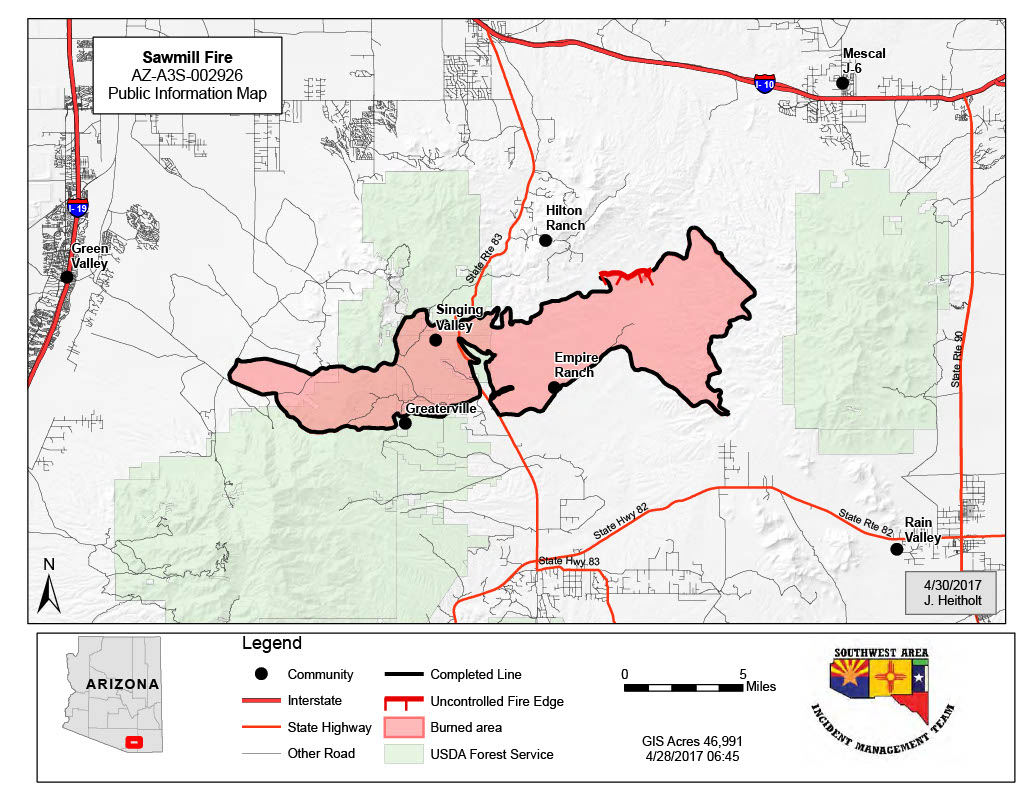
- Map of the Sawmill Fire on April 28, 2017
- Date: April 23–30, 2017
- Location: Pima County, Arizona, US
- Coordinates: 31.782°N 110.842°W

Statistics
- Burned area: 46,991 acres (19,017 ha; 73.423 sq mi; 190.17 km^{2})

Impacts
- Cost: $8.2 million (equivalent to $10.8 million in 2025)

Ignition
- Cause: Explosion at gender reveal party

Map
- Location within Arizona Location within the United States

The Sawmill Fire was a wildfire that burned 46,991 acres (190 km^{2}) in the U.S. state of Arizona in April 2017. The fire was caused by the detonation of a target packed with Tannerite at a gender reveal party in the Coronado National Forest. No injuries or fatalities resulted from the fire, nor were any buildings destroyed, though the fire did come close to the historic Empire Ranch, a National Register of Historic Places property. Over 800 personnel from various federal, state, and local agencies and organizations worked to contain and then extinguish the Sawmill Fire at a cost of $8.2 million (equivalent to $10.8 million in 2025).

The fire was started by accident on April 23, 2017, by Dennis Dickey, an off-duty U.S. Border Patrol agent who had shot the Tannerite target. Dickey immediately informed first responders of the fire, which spread rapidly until it was contained on April 30. The U.S. Attorney's Office charged Dickey with a misdemeanor charge to which he pleaded guilty, fined him $220,000 in restitution (equivalent to $282,000 in 2025), and sentenced him to five years' probation. When the U.S. Forest Service released footage of the fire's inception in November 2018 at the request of a local news agency, the concept and practice of gender reveal parties became the subject of widespread ridicule and online mockery, a pattern repeated after later wildfires started at such events.

== Background ==
Wildfires are a natural part of the ecological cycle of the Southwestern United States. The Sawmill Fire was one of 2,321 wildfires that burned 429,564 acres (173,838 ha) in Arizona in 2017. Arizona State Forester Jeff Whitney expected a typical season in the state's northern forests but one with high fire potential in the state's southern grasslands because of high temperatures, low humidity, and an abundance of fuels. By August 2017, wildfires had burned the most land since the 2011 season.

== Cause ==
The fire began at around 11 am (MST) on April 23, 2017, in the Coronado National Forest, a federally owned property in south-central Arizona, 26 miles (42 km) south of Tucson, Arizona. The cause of the fire was a detonation at a gender reveal party hosted by the Dickey family of a target packed with blue dye to indicate the male gender of their child, and Tannerite, a highly explosive substance, by Dennis Dickey, an off-duty U.S. Border Patrol agent and the child's father. Dickey fired at the target four times, striking and detonating it with the fourth shot; the explosion immediately set the nearby grass on fire. According to his attorney, Dickey attempted to put out the fire but was unsuccessful because of the speed at which it was spreading. Afterward, Dickey alerted law enforcement and admitted culpability for the fire, and subsequently cooperated with authorities.

== Fire ==
At the time the Sawmill Fire began, a fire warning for the area from the National Weather Service was in effect, as local wind speeds were as high as 40 miles per hour (64 km/h), and precipitation was abnormally low for the region. These conditions allowed the fire to spread quickly, and by the time elements of the Green Valley Fire Department arrived at 11:11 am (MDT), the Sawmill Fire had grown to 300 acres (120 ha) and was spreading to the north and east. Firefighters began to attempt suppression of the fire, which was difficult in the rough terrain of the Santa Rita Mountains. By April 24, the fire had consumed about 7,500 acres (3,000 ha), despite the assistance of five airtankers and three helicopters carrying water. That night, the fire crossed and damaged Arizona State Route 83, which runs south through the Coronado National Forest and had been closed earlier that day, and headed east across the Santa Rita Mountains.

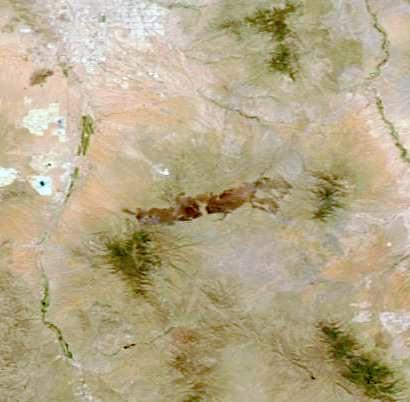
The burn scar of the Sawmill Fire seen from satellite on April 26

As the fire continued to spread, about 100 area residents were evacuated and 100 others east of Route 83 received pre-evacuation notices. The local chapter of the American Red Cross opened two shelters in Sonoita and Tucson on April 24 and 25, but they were almost totally unused and were closed on April 29. By April 25, 363 first responders were fighting the Sawmill Fire, which had grown to 17,000–20,000 acres (6,900–8,100 ha) because of continued low humidity and high winds that made aerial firefighting impossible. Winds subsided the night of April 25–26, allowing the now approximately 600 firefighters present to halt the southern spread of the fire near Empire Ranch, where flames came as close as 50 feet (15 m) to the ranch's historic buildings. The fire's area nonetheless doubled to 40,356 acres (16,331 ha) and conditions were expected to worsen because of a storm system in northern Arizona. Arizona State Route 83 and Interstate 10 were closed on April 27.

By 11:00 am (MST) April 27, the Sawmill Fire had burned 46,954 acres (19,002 ha), and efforts to suppress it had by then cost $1 million (equivalent to $1.3 million in 2025). About 800 firefighters were present and made progress containing the fire with firebreaks on April 28 and 29, despite aircraft again being grounded by the wind. Route 83 was reopened and evacuation orders for people to its west were lifted on April 27. Despite winds as fast as 45 miles per hour (72 km/h) on April 28, the fire was fully contained and all evacuation orders were lifted by April 30. The firefighters were demobilized on May 1.

== Aftermath ==
The Sawmill Fire burned 46,991 acres (19,017 ha) over 11 days, growing to its greatest extent on April 29, and cost $8.2 million (equivalent to $10.8 million in 2025) to suppress. The state-owned Santa Rita Experimental Range and Wildlife Area and the Las Cienegas National Conservation Area (LCNCA), managed by the Bureau of Land Management, made up most of the burned area; 28% of the LCNCA, roughly 12,000 acres (4,900 ha), was burned and was closed from April 28 to May 23. Of the total area burned, about a third of it suffered total foliage mortality, concentrated in the west. 412 people were evacuated, but there were no fatalities, serious injuries, or buildings destroyed. After repairs to Route 83, it reopened in early May 2017.

=== Legal action against Dickey ===
The investigation and prosecution of the Sawmill Fire were turned over to the U.S. Attorney's Office in August 2017 as, though the fire started on the property of the State of Arizona, federal property had been burned. On September 20, 2018, Dickey was charged with starting a fire without a permit, a misdemeanor offense, and was summoned to appear at the U.S. District Court for the District of Arizona on September 29. He pleaded guilty to the charge, saying that the fire was an accident and that April 23, 2017, was "one of the worst days of [his] life". On October 9, 2018, Dickey was sentenced to five years' probation and agreed to pay the cost of the fire in restitution. This was reduced to $220,000 by a federal court in October 2018 (equivalent to $282,000 in 2025). Dickey also agreed to appear in a public service announcement for the USFS regarding the fire.

In July 2017, lawmakers in Pima County proposed the ban of the possession, creation, and distribution of explosive targets in response to the Sawmill Fire and other fires caused by exploding targets. Footage of Dickey shooting the target became public when, in November 2018, the Arizona Daily Star acquired it via a Freedom of Information Act request. The video brought the fire back into the public consciousness, resulting in both the party itself and the concept of gender reveal parties being mocked online. The Sawmill Fire was the first wildfire known to be ignited by a gender reveal party, but was not the last, as it was followed in 2020 by the El Dorado Fire in California, which sparked more public outrage.
