= Las Cienegas National Conservation Area =

American protected area in Arizona

- IUCN category V (protected landscape/seascape)
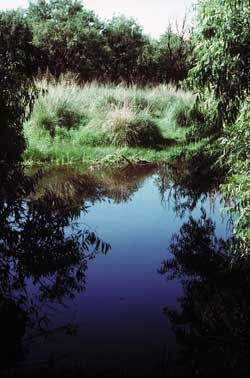
- Cienega Creek

- Location within the United States
- Location: Pima and Santa Cruz counties, Arizona, United States
- Nearest city: Sierra Vista, Arizona
- Coordinates: 31°46′48″N 110°37′08″W
- Area: 45,000 acres (180 km^{2})
- Established: 2000
- Governing body: Bureau of Land Management
- Website: Las Cienegas National Conservation Area

The Las Cienegas National Conservation Area is a National Conservation Area of Arizona, located in the transitional zone between the Sonoran Desert and the Chihuahuan Desert.

== Description ==
Facing housing and commercial development, more than 45,000 acres (180 km^{2}) of rolling grasslands and woodlands in Arizona's Pima and Santa Cruz counties was protected as a National Conservation Area. The region's rolling grasslands, oak-studded hills that connect several "sky island" mountain ranges, and lush riparian corridors attract both people and wildlife. Ciénega Creek, with its perennial flow and riparian corridor, supports a diverse plant and animal community.

The Empire and Cienega ranches, along with portions of the adjacent Rose Tree and Vera Earl ranches, were put under public ownership and managed by Bureau of Land Management (BLM) under the principles of multiple-use and ecosystem management for future generations to use and enjoy. The BLM has formed a partnership with the nonprofit Empire Ranch Foundation, which is dedicated to preserving the historic buildings and surrounding landscapes.

== Gallery ==
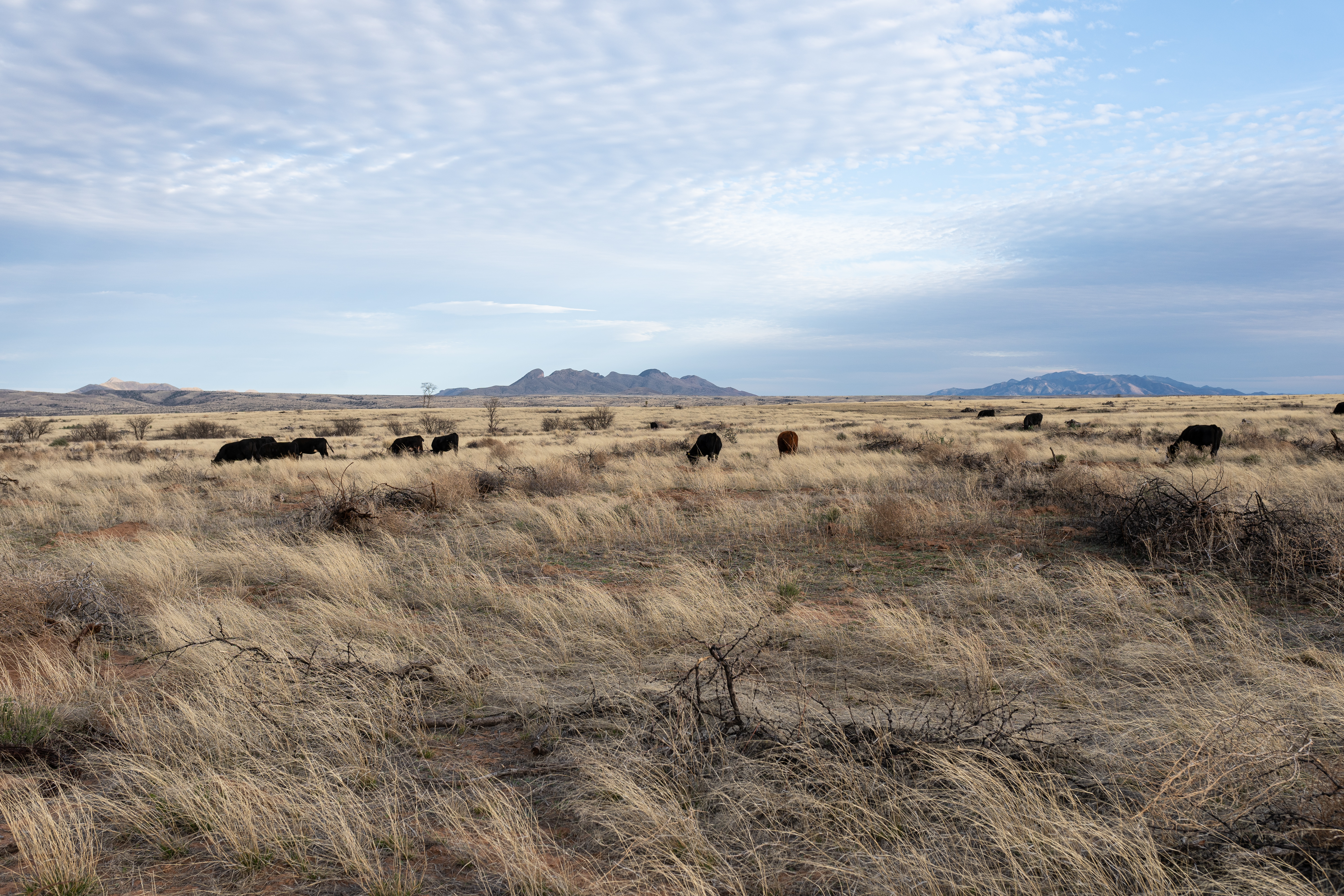
Cattle grazing on Empire Ranch

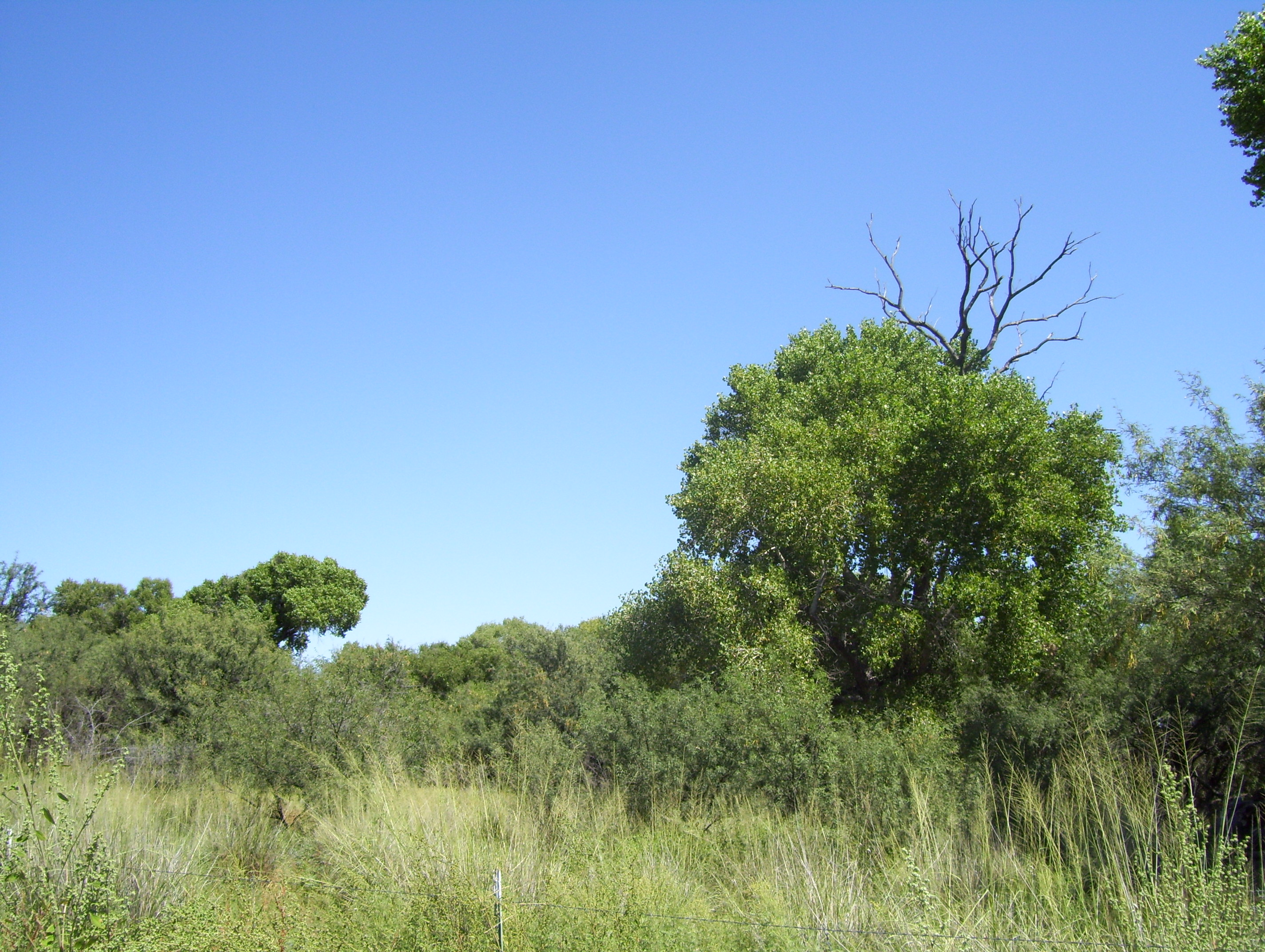
Cottonwood trees along Cienega Creek.

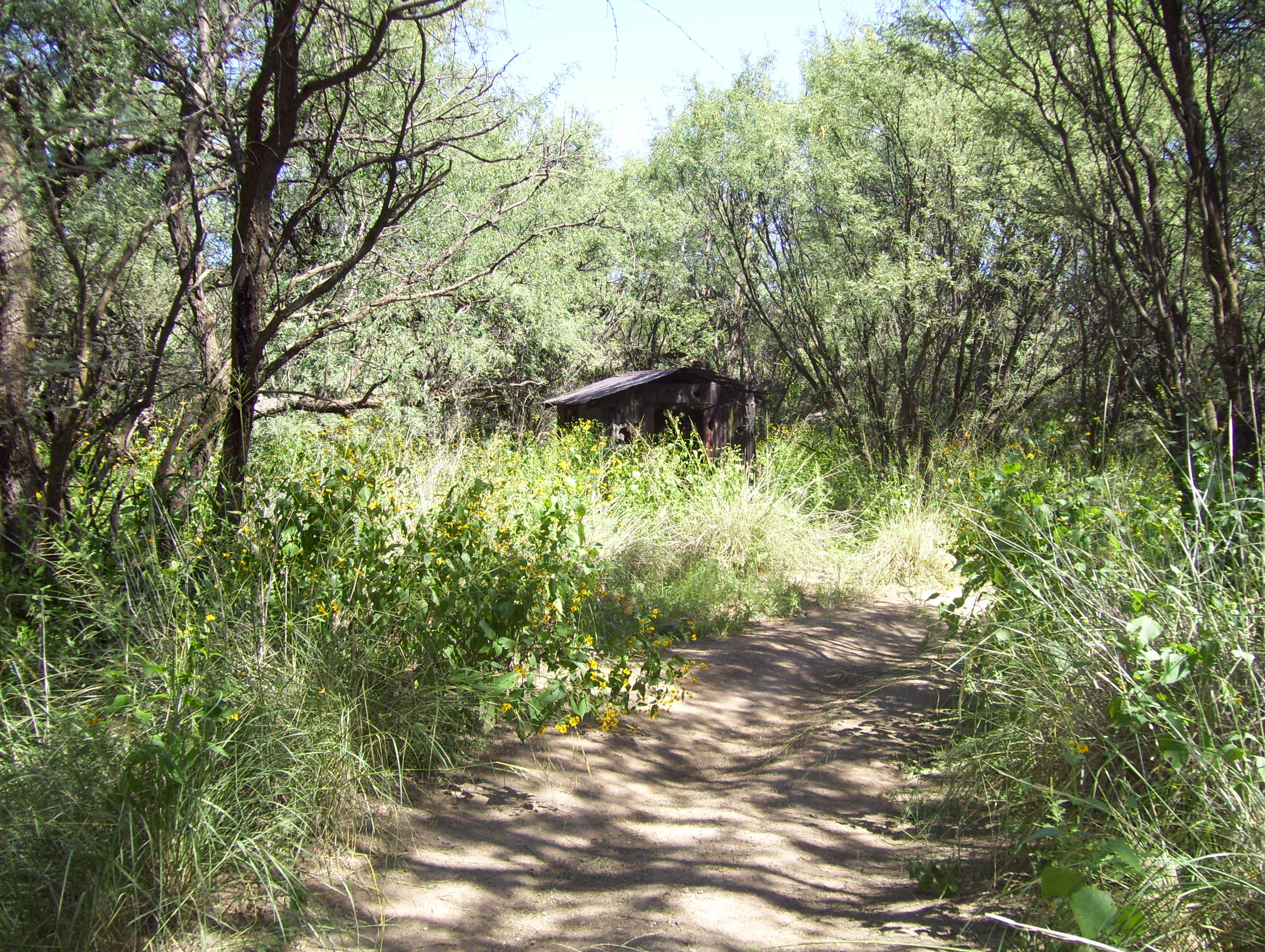
An old shack along Cienega Creek.

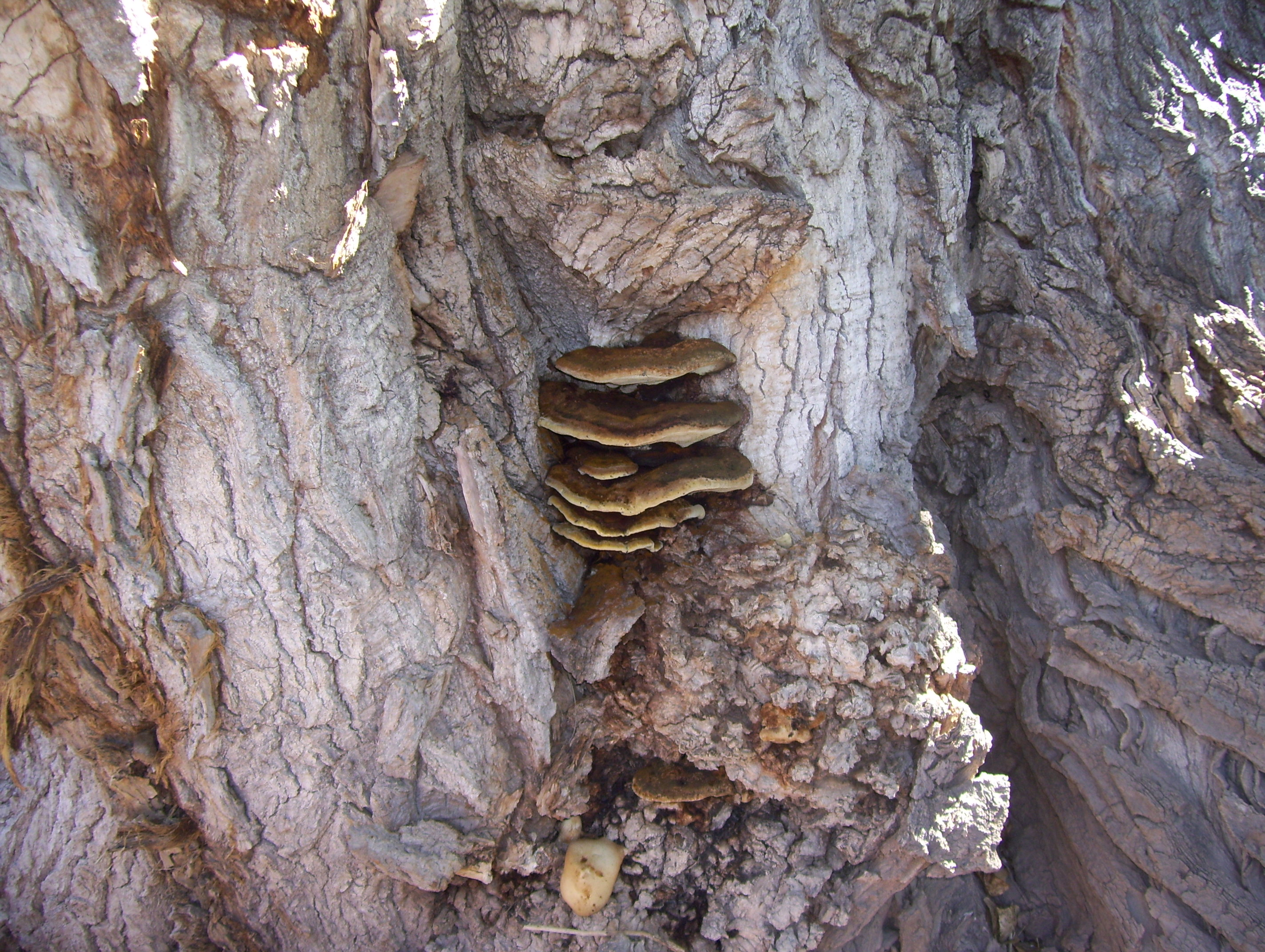
Bracket fungus in the NCA.

== See also ==
- Empire Ranch
- List of protected grasslands of North America
