= Gender reveal party =

Fetal sex reveal event

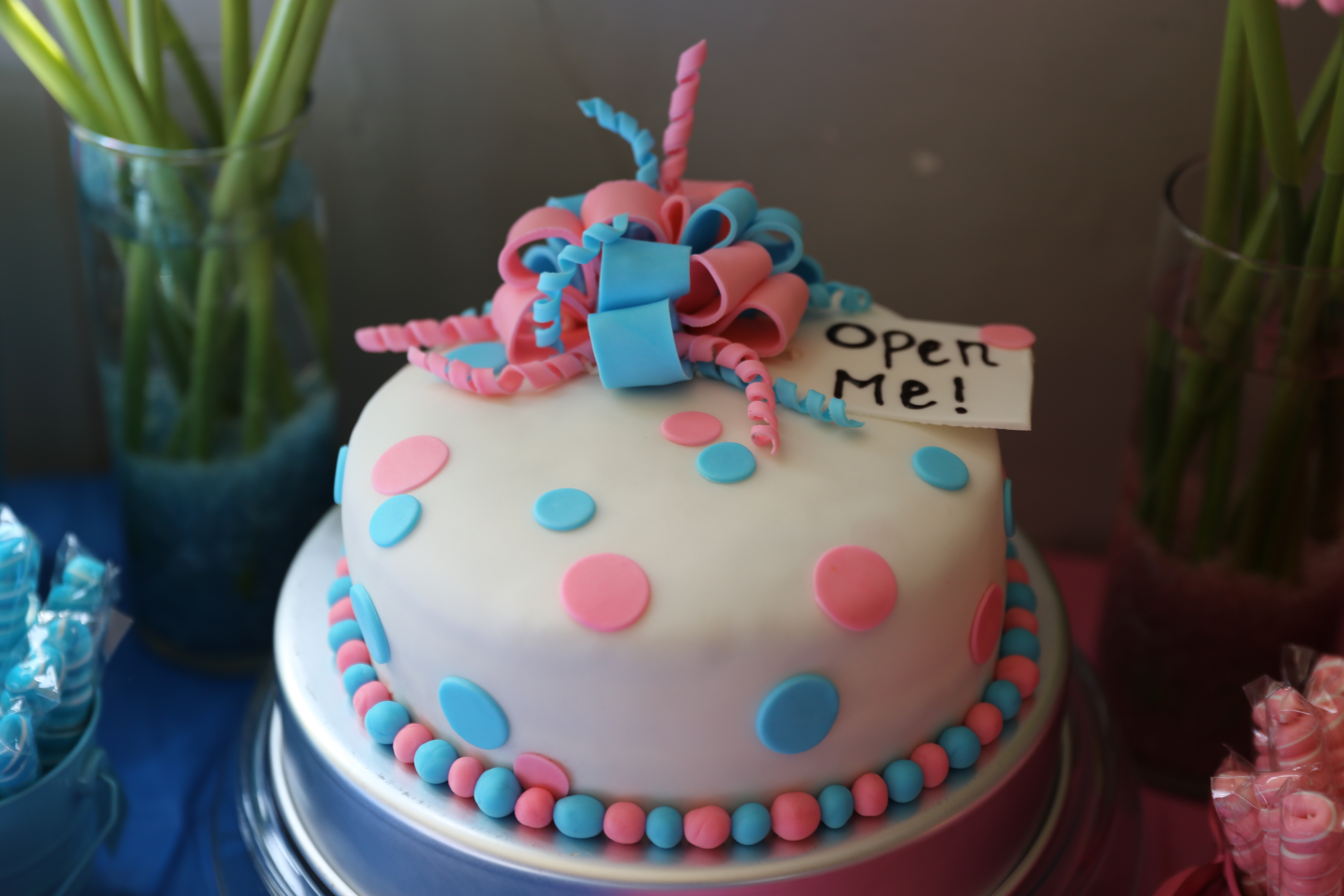
An uncut gender reveal cake decorated with pink and blue on a white base, using both pink and blue to represent ambiguity before the reveal

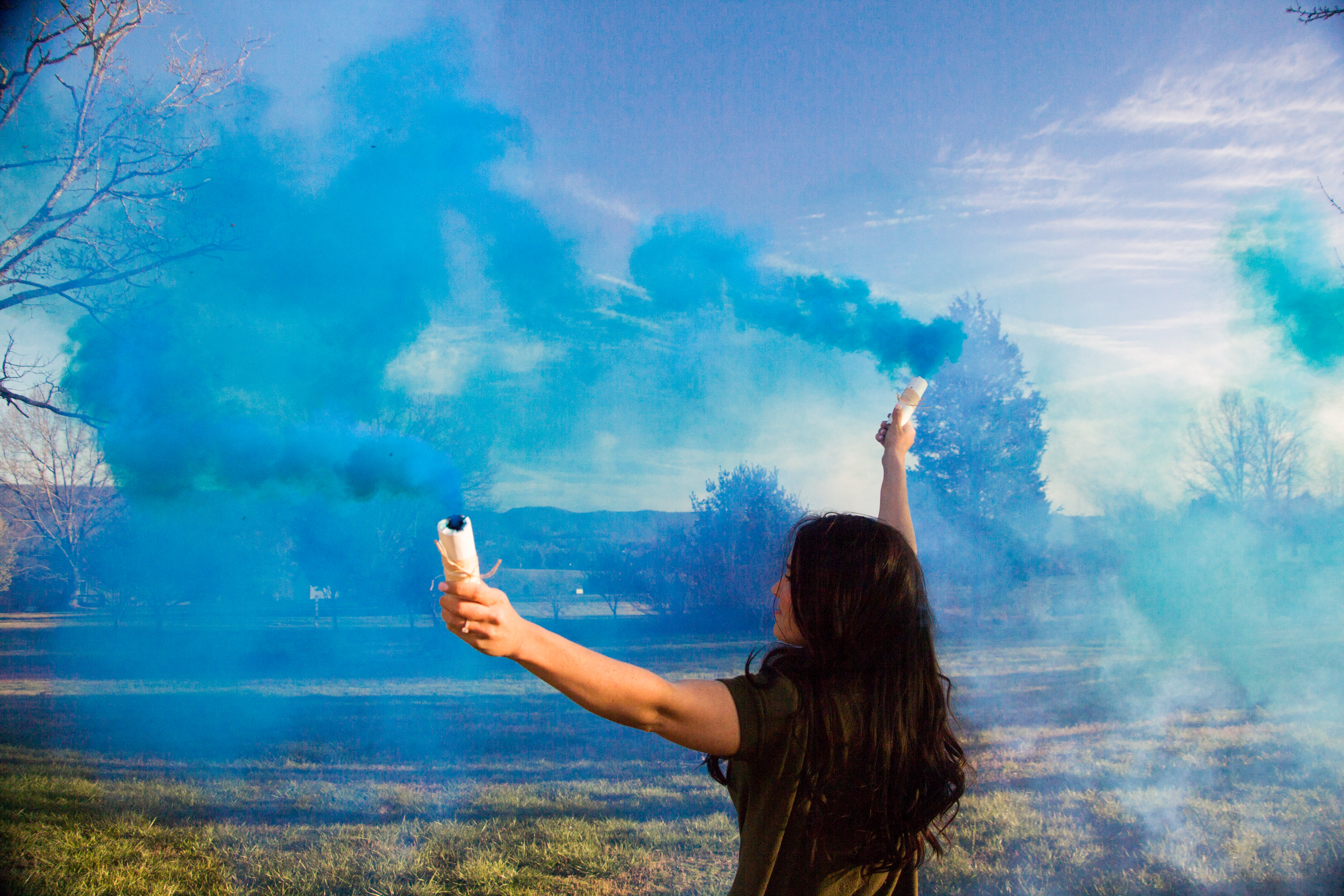
A gender reveal event using blue-colored smoke bombs to represent the expectation of a male child

A gender reveal party is a party held during pregnancy to reveal the baby's sex to the expectant parents' family and friends, and sometimes to the parents themselves. Prenatal sex discernment technology furnishes the necessary information. The practice originated in the United States during the late 2000s.

It is distinct from, but sometimes combined with, a baby shower, where the primary activity is giving expecting parents gifts for their future child. The gender reveal party often involves gender stereotypes such as pink and blue denoting girls and boys, respectively.

The practice has been criticized for the use of elaborate and dangerous special effects, which have directly contributed to multiple deaths, injuries and large-scale forest fires, namely the 2017 Sawmill Fire and the 2020 El Dorado Fire. The practice has also been criticized for reinforcing gender stereotypes and the gender binary.

== History and development ==
The gender reveal party developed in the late 2000s. An early example was recorded in the 2008 posts of Jenna Karvunidis on her ChicagoNow blog High Gloss and Sauce announcing the sex of her fetus via a cake; she had previously had several miscarriages and wished to celebrate that her pregnancy had developed to the point that the sex of the fetus could be determined. YouTube videos can be found as early as 2008 and 2009, becoming significant around 2011, after which the trend continued to grow through the 2010s.

In 2019, Karvunidis observed an increase in extreme reveal events over the preceding five years, with parents "burning down forests and exploding cars, bringing alligators into the mix". She expressed regret at having helped start the trend, learning how the LGBT and intersex communities feel, and finally revealing the daughter they announced back in 2008 to be a gender-nonconforming individual who wears suits while still identifying as female. After the 2020 El Dorado Fire was started by a malfunctioning pyrotechnical device at a gender reveal party, Karvunidis pleaded for people to stop staging such events.

=== Comparison to baby showers ===
In the United States, baby showers developed as part of the Mid-20th-century baby boom, focusing on giving gifts to the expectant parent(s) to assist them raising their future child. Baby showers were considered events for women only originally, however that tradition is being supplanted in the 21st century to include co-ed events. In 2017, Dr. Carly Gieseler compared the practices saying "while traditional baby showers have been located in the feminine realm, the gender-reveal party invites male partners and community members to this celebration."

=== Spread and mediatization ===
This trend was popularized on social media platforms such as YouTube, Instagram, and Pinterest, although it originated before the latter two. This mediatization has significantly boosted the likelihood of expectant parents to have or take part in gender reveal parties. Internet remix culture lends the practice great receptivity toward individual creativity, a factor in their growing popularity. Demographic research published in 2015 shows the most gender reveal parties are done by expecting parents that are middle-class, heterosexual White Americans who are married or partnered.

The trend has also reached South Korea. In 2022, Na Ju-ye of the Hankook Ilbo reported that the trend was growing amongst young parents. Na noted that the parties differed in several ways from those in the West. Some parties, instead of focusing on the parents, are focused on the grandparents. In addition, due to the low birth rate in South Korea, both the parties are perceived somewhat positively and the historical practice of preferring male children has become significantly reduced. Finally, while there is technically a law that forbids doctors from informing parents of a baby's gender before 32 weeks of pregnancy, parents still manage to receive guesses from doctors.

== Planning the event ==
The focus of gender reveal parties being the fetal sex, such information is a prerequisite. This can be determined at or after the gestational age required by the method being used. For ultrasound, the most common method, the earliest this can be reliably done is approximately 65 days, but it is typically done at around 20 weeks. (Note: Measured from the onset of pregnancy-induced amenorrhea.) Both the determination of fetal sex and the party are typically held during the second trimester.

Post-examination knowledge of the fetal sex by the parents varies. Most commonly, a third party (sometimes called a "gender guardian") is entrusted with the information, and it remains a secret from the parents until the reveal. This person is responsible for making party arrangements to ensure the reveal happens without the prior knowledge of the parents. In other cases, it is already known to one or both parents, and the reveal is specifically for attendees.

To help maintain the mystery, party decorations are typically heavily gendered, but ambiguous when taken as a whole.

== During the event ==
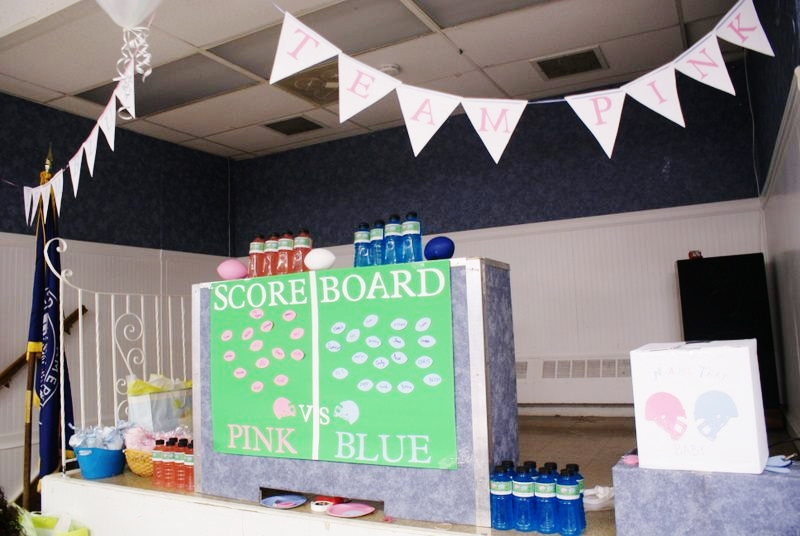
American football-themed gender reveal party featuring "Team Pink" vs. "Team Blue".

While the focus remains on the fetal sex, the reveal is typically the climax of the party. Prior to the reveal, party games are common, in which attendees or expecting parents guess or assert the fetal sex. This can also take the form of competition between a "Team Pink" and "Team Blue" which parents or participants may join.

Sometimes the event includes features of a baby shower. If this is the case, gifts may be given or opened at a specific time.

=== The reveal ===
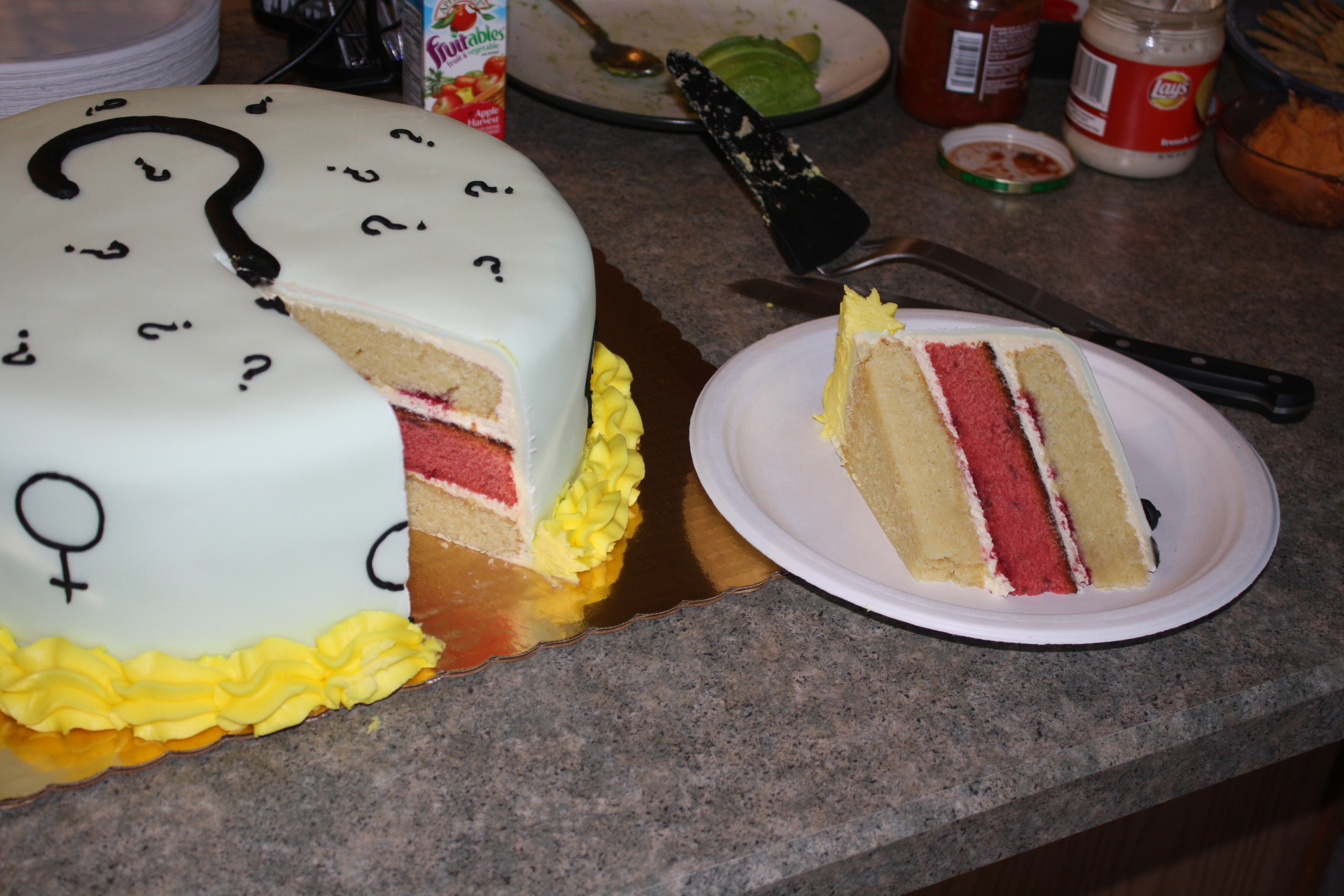
A gender reveal cake sliced open, with a pink middle layer suggesting a baby girl

Most reveal methods utilize gender-associated colors, most typically blue and pink representing male and female respectively, decorated with other gender-associated items. The method of reveal varies; common methods involve cutting special cakes, launching or popping balloons, confetti, streamers, piñatas, colored smoke, and Silly String. Other seasonally-related items such as Easter eggs, Jack-o'-lanterns, Christmas presents, or Fourth of July or New Year's fireworks may also be incorporated depending on time of pregnancy.

Once these colors are revealed, both the expecting parents and onlookers are made aware of the fetus's sex, typically to great celebration and comment by attendees. The announcement of a predetermined, sex-dependent baby name may also take place.

== Criticism ==
The term "gender reveal" is considered a misnomer by those who believe in a distinction between sex and gender. In this view, gender is a social construct and impossible to determine from biological characteristics. Thus, when the "gender reveal" is made, it is the sex and not the gender that is being revealed. Although some have argued renaming the concept to a "sex reveal party", the title has failed to catch on.

Furthermore, gender reveal parties rely heavily on the assumption that the child will not be intersex, which occurs in an estimated 1 in 4,500–5,500 births. Gender reveal parties have been argued to reinforce gender essentialism, precluding and minimizing transgender identity. Some parents have rejected gender reveal events, in part because of conversations regarding gender identity and transgender issues becoming more common.

Overall, the practice reinforces stereotypical gender roles, often utilizing polarizing gender dichotomies in party materials such as "Guns or Glitter", "Pistols or Pearls", or "Wheels or Heels". Critics say that there is no reason to assume a neat fit into the essentialist dichotomy even in the case of a cisgender, non-intersex child. In 2019, Jenna Karvunidis, considered one of the pioneers of gender reveal parties, called for re-evaluation of the practice due to how it might affect transgender and non-binary individuals, writing about her own daughter's gender nonconformity.

The practice has also been criticised for sometimes involving dangerous stunts and animal abuse. After the El Dorado Fire in 2020, Karvunidis decried the parties and pleaded for people to stop having them.

== Incidents and injuries ==
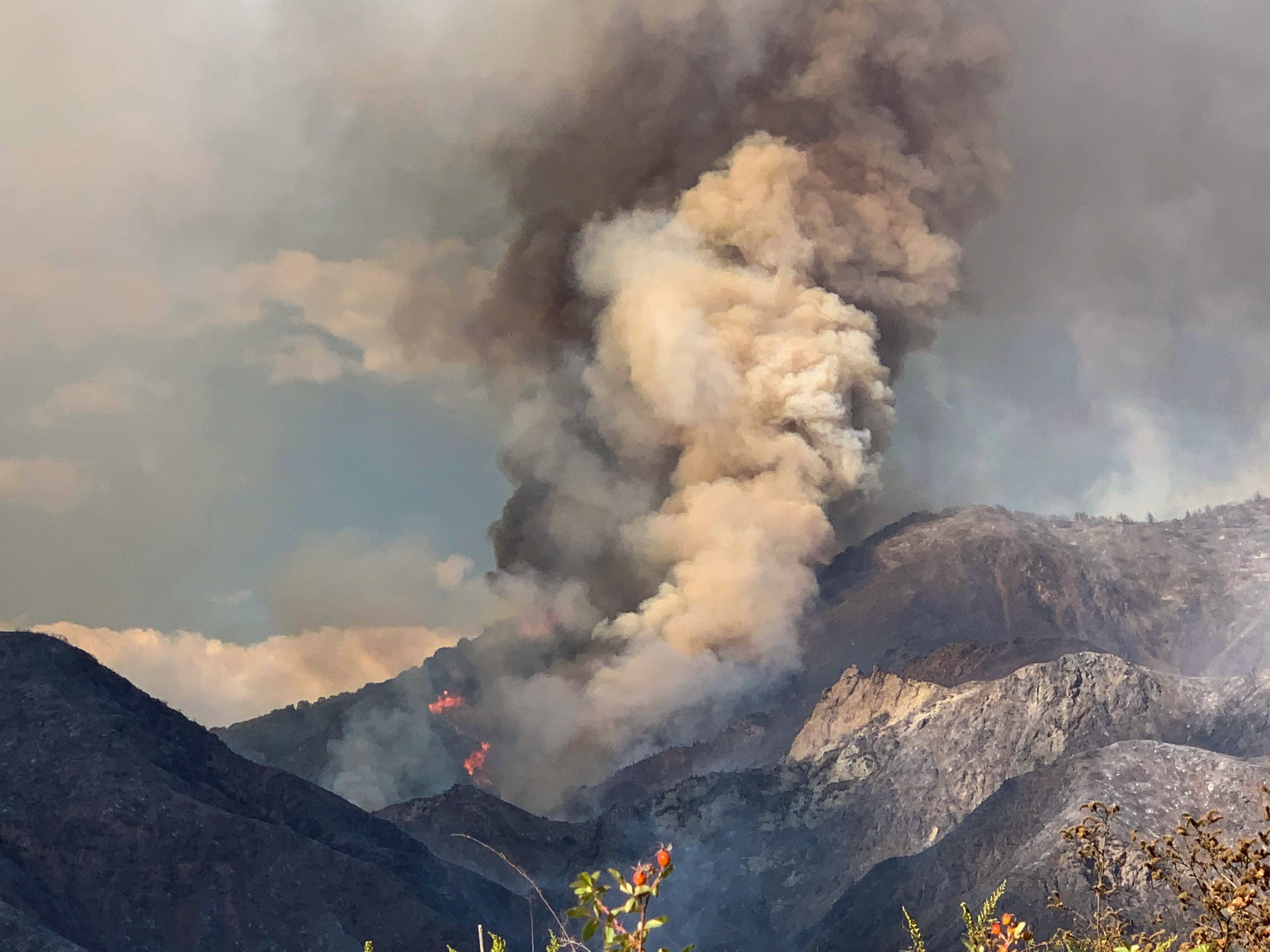
The 2020 El Dorado Fire was ignited by gender reveal pyrotechnics, burned 22,744 acres (9,204 ha) of forest and killed one firefighter

Some instances of attempted spectacular special effects at gender reveal events have caused injury, death, and large-scale damage:

- The 2017 Sawmill Fire in Arizona was caused by a gender reveal party that combined blue powder and Tannerite. Other dangerous stunts have involved fireworks and alligators.
- In October 2019, a woman was killed in Knoxville, Iowa, by flying shrapnel from the explosion of an improvised explosive device meant to reveal her grandchild's gender. The device, made from a metal cylinder packed with gunpowder and colored baby powder, was intended to project a display vertically, but the tape covering its top, which caused overpressure when the gunpowder was ignited, led it to explode and fragment in a manner similar to a pipe bomb. The force of the explosion was such that the shrapnel fragment that killed the victim continued through the air for another 144 yards (132 m) before coming to a rest in a field adjacent to the property where the party was taking place.
- In September 2020, a gender reveal pyrotechnic device started the El Dorado Fire near Yucaipa, California, destroying homes, prompting evacuations, burning thousands of acres, and causing the death of one firefighter.
- On February 21, 2021, the accidental explosion of an in-development gender reveal device in Liberty, New York, killed the father-to-be and injured his younger brother.
- On March 29, 2021, two people were killed when a plane crashed in the Caribbean Sea off the coast of Mexico near Cancún while carrying a trailing sign that read "It's a girl!"
- On September 2, 2023, a Piper PA-25 Pawnee crop duster crashed during a gender reveal party in Navolato, Sinaloa, Mexico. The plane had been employed to drop pink powder over the party, but crashed during the maneuvre when the aircraft's left wing separated from the fuselage. The pilot died on the way to the hospital.
- In May 2025, video emerged of Israeli soldiers detonating explosives they had placed in a Gazan residential building, leveling it and releasing blue smoke; they laughed that it was a "gender reveal" and "it's a boy".

== Transgender reveal parties ==
Some families of transgender people host gender reveal parties for transgender family members who come out during these parties. Carly Gieseler has noted that the traditional parties "disregard the experiences of trans, intersex, and nonbinary folk", and a transgender reveal party delivers the reversal, a celebration of gender unrelated to fetal sex.

In 2019, NBC reported on the virality of one Kentucky mother's "transgender-reveal photoshoot", in which she shared images of herself sporting a fake baby bump alongside her then twenty-year-old son swathed in a blanket inscribed with words "It's a Boy". The post was reportedly well-received, as the mother described, the majority of the response being "warm and positive" in nature.

In 2020, ABC News, The Mirror, and Metro reported on one Texan mother's choice to host a "second gender reveal party" for her then six-year-old daughter. Despite some negative feedback surrounding the child's age, the parents advised those considering throwing a traditional gender reveal party to wait until their child was at least a couple of years old, and to "be prepared that it might change".
