= Breezy Pines, Arizona =

- Populated place
- Location within the state of Arizona Breezy Pines, Arizona (the United States)
- Coordinates: 34°26′20″N 112°21′17″W
- Country: United States
- State: Arizona
- County: Yavapai
- Elevation: 5,945 ft (1,812 m)
- Time zone: UTC-7 (Mountain (MST))
  - Summer (DST): UTC-7 (MST)
- Area code: 928
- GNIS feature ID: 41088

Breezy Pine is a populated place situated in Yavapai County, Arizona, United States.
