= Frye Mesa Reservoir =

Reservoir in Graham County, Arizona, US

- Location within Arizona
- Location: Graham County, Arizona, United States
- Coordinates: 32°45′14″N 109°50′03″W
- Type: reservoir
- Basin countries: United States
- Surface area: 4 acres (1.6 ha)
- Average depth: 95 ft (29 m)
- Surface elevation: 5,500 ft (1,700 m)

Frye Mesa Reservoir is located in southeastern Arizona, 15 miles (24 km) southwest of Safford in the Coronado National Forest.

== Fish species ==
- Rainbow trout
- Brown trout
- Brook trout
- Gila trout
- Smallmouth bass
