= Icon (Luba album) =

Compilation album by Luba
- Released: 2014
- Genre: Pop, neo-soul
- Label: Universal Music Canada

Luba chronology
From The Bitter To The Sweet (2000)	Icon (2014)

Icon is a compilation album by the Canadian-Ukrainian singer-songwriter Luba. It is the first release by Luba for 14 years. Icon is a compilation of previously released songs, as well as a new track, Heaven, which was presented on Luba's MySpace around 2007. The album has been released by Universal Music Canada.

== Track listing ==
1. Let It Go (European Single Version) - appears on Secrets and Sins
2. Giving Away A Miracle - appears on All or Nothing
3. "When a Man Loves a Woman" (Live) - appears on Over 60 Minutes with Luba
4. Everytime I See Your Picture - appears on Secrets and Sins and Luba (EP)
5. Is She A Lot Like Me - appears on From The Bitter To The Sweet
6. Storm Before The Calm - appears on Secrets and Sins
7. Innocent (With An Explanation) - appears on Between The Earth & Sky
8. Little Salvation - appears on All or Nothing
9. How Many - appears on Between The Earth & Sky
10. No More Words - appears on All or Nothing
11. Heaven - previously unreleased, previewed on Luba's MySpace page
12. Let It Go (Acoustic Version) - appears on On Tour (EP)
