= Defunct local councils of the Boy Scouts of America in California =

The defunct Boy Scout councils are those which have been closed and merged with other councils.

== Defunct councils ==
=== Alameda Council ===
Alameda Council (#022)
- Owner: Boy Scouts of America
- Headquarters: Alameda, California
- Country: United States
- Founded: 1917
- Scout Executive: Charles Howard-Gibbon
- Website www.bsa-alameda.org

Alameda Council (#022) is one of the three smallest Boy Scout councils in the United States, serving youth in the city of Alameda. It was organized in December 1916, shortly after the organization of BSA councils in Berkeley and Oakland, making it the third oldest BSA council in Northern California. It is one of six BSA councils that serve the San Francisco Bay area.

=== San Francisco Bay Area Council ===
San Francisco Bay Area Council #028
- Owner: Boy Scouts of America
- Headquarters: San Leandro, California
- Country: United States
- Website www.sfbac.org

The SFBAC (#028) was formed by a merger of the San Francisco Area Council and Oakland Area Council in February 1964. Located in the San Francisco Bay Area, serving the cities of Colma, Daly City (northern section), San Francisco, Emeryville, Oakland, San Leandro, Hayward, Fremont, Union City, Newark, Pleasanton, Dublin, and Livermore, as well as unincorporated communities such as Castro Valley, San Lorenzo, and Sunol. In June 1916, the Oakland-Piedmont Council (#021) was chartered, changing its name in 1921 to the Oakland Area Council after Piedmont elected to organize their own council. In January 1917, the San Francisco Council (#051) was chartered, changing its name in 1924 to the San Francisco Area Council.

=== Los Angeles Area Council ===
Los Angeles Area Council (#033)
- Owner: Boy Scouts of America
- Headquarters: Los Angeles, California
- Country: United States
- Founded: 1915
- Website boyscoutsla.org

Los Angeles Area Council (LAAC) (#33) served most of the City of Los Angeles as well as several other cities in the greater Los Angeles area. It was one of five Boy Scouts of America councils in Los Angeles County, California.

The Los Angeles Area Council was founded in 1915 as the Centinela Council, changing its name in 1925 to the Los Angeles Council. In 1934 the San Antonio District (#046), founded in 1922; and the South Pasadena Council (#067), founded in 1927 merged into the LAC, with the name of the organization changing to the Los Angeles Metropolitan Area Council. The council name changed to LAAC in 1945. and currently merging into GLAAC.

=== Monterey Bay Area Council ===
Monterey Bay Area Council (#025)
- Owner: Boy Scouts of America
- Headquarters: Salinas, California
- Country: United States
- Founded: 1933
- Defunct: 2012
- Website http://mbacbsa.org

In July 2012, the Monterey Bay Area Council announced it would be merging with the Santa Clara County Council. Upon the departure of former Council Executive Albert Gallegos, the existing council board asked the Santa Clara County Council to operate the council while the merger is underway. The new combined council name has been selected to be the Silicon Valley Monterey Bay Council. The merger was finalized in December 2012.

The Santa Clara County Council and the Monterey Bay Area Council share borders on two sides. The Santa Clara Council has successfully balanced its budget from 2002 to 2012 and has attracted new membership every month for nearly four years. It was recognized by the National Council of the Boy Scouts of America as a Centennial Quality Council every year from 2006 and 2010 and was a Gold level Journey to Excellence Council in 2011. The Monterey Bay Area Council was on “conditional charters” during 2010 and 2011 and was given specific goals to balance its budget and increase its membership. The Council failed to reach those goals and in 2012 the national BSA gave the Monterey Bay Area Council a “transitional charter” and instructed it to seek a merger.

The announcement attributed the merger in large part to more than a million dollars in debt accumulated by the Monterey Bay Area Council during the construction of a fish ladder and a new dining lodge at Camp Pico Blanco along with declining enrollment. In September 2012, the combined councils announced that over 75 names had been suggested by volunteers for the new council, and that from among these names they had chosen Silicon Valley Monterey Bay Council as the combined council's name.

=== Mount Diablo Silverado Council ===
Mount Diablo Silverado Council (#023)
- Owner: Boy Scouts of America
- Headquarters: Pleasant Hill, California
- Country: United States
- Website mdscbsa.org

Mount Diablo Silverado Council serves chartered organizations and BSA units in Contra Costa County, Lake County, Napa County, Solano County (except the cities of Dixon, Rio Vista, and Vacaville), and the cities of Albany and Berkeley in northern Alameda County.

The Mount Diablo Silverado Council (#023) was formed in 1992 as the result of a merger between the former Silverado Area Council (#038) and the former Mount Diablo Council (#023). The Mount Diablo Silverado Council can trace its history back to the Berkeley Council which was organized in March 1916.

=== Old Baldy Council ===
Old Baldy Council (#043)
- Owner: Boy Scouts of America
- Headquarters: Ontario, California
- Country: United States
- Founded: 1917
- Defunct: 2006

The Old Baldy Council (#043) was founded in 1917 as the Pomona Council. It changed its name in 1921 to Old Baldy. The Old Baldy name is from Mount San Antonio, often called "Old Baldy" or "Mount Baldy", the highest peak in the San Gabriel Mountains.

On May 1, 2006, Old Baldy Council was dissolved, with the chartered organizations and units reassigned into two neighboring councils. The Sunset District (in Los Angeles County) joined with the San Gabriel Valley Council and the Golden Eagle and Trails End Districts (in San Bernardino County) merged with the California Inland Empire Council.

=== San Gabriel Valley Council ===
San Gabriel Valley Council #040
- Owner: Boy Scouts of America
- Headquarters: Pasadena, California
- Location: Los Angeles County
- Country: United States
- Founded: Jan. 1, 1919
- Website sgvcbsa.org

Located in Los Angeles County, California's San Gabriel Valley, the Boy Scouts of America's San Gabriel Valley Council (#040) is one of five councils serving Los Angeles County.

Greater Los Angeles Area Council (GLAAC) is a new Boy Scouts of America Council made from the merger of the Los Angeles Area Council and the San Gabriel Valley Council. The vote to merge was held on March 21, 2015. The new name Council, Greater Los Angeles Area Council, was announced on June 11, 2015. The new Council will continue with Scouting Service centers in Los Angeles and Pasadena. GLAAC has three Scout shops in Los Angeles, San Pedro and Pasadena. GLAAC operates eight BSA Camps in the greater Los Angeles area. Due to the large size of the two original councils, the merger is a process that will be completed over a time span.

== See also ==
- Scouting in California
