= Whispering Wind =

Whispering Wind or Whispering Winds may refer to:

== Music ==
- "Whispering Wind", a song by The Angry Boyscouts' later covered by the Heise Hill Band
- "Whispering Winds", an orchestral arrangement by Twilight Force from the 2014 album Tales of Ancient Prophecies
- "Whispering Wind", an album by Mary Rice Hopkins
- "Whispering Wind", a song by Ann Barnes
- "Whispering Wind", a song from Feet of Flames
- "Whispering Wind", a song by Green on Red from The Killer Inside Me
- "Whispering Wind", a song by Luba (then known as Lubomyra) from Lubomyra
- "Whispering Wind", a song by Moby from Play: The B Sides
- "The Whispering Wind", a song by Riders in the Sky from Always Drink Upstream from the Herd
- "The Whispering Wind (Blows On By)", a song by Mandy Barnett from I've Got a Right to Cry
- "Whispering Winds", a song from The Land Before Time V: The Mysterious Island
- "Whispering Winds", a 1952 song by Patti Page
- "Whispering Winds", a flute solo from Riverdance
- "Whispering Winds", a song composed by Corky Robbins

== Films ==
- The Whispering Wind, a non-feature film which won the Best Anthropological / Ethnographic Film award at the 33rd National Film Awards
- Whispering Winds (film), a 1929 American film

== Locations ==
- Whispering Winds, a ranch resided in by L. Ron Hubbard
- Whispering Winds, a unit of Camp Joe Scherman
- Whispering Winds Catholic Conference Center, a camp in Southern California, United States
- Whispering Winds Nudist Camp, host of the Starwood Festival

== Schools ==
- Whispering Wind, an elementary school in the Paradise Valley Unified School District
- Whispering Winds Charter School, a school in Chiefland, Florida, in the district of the School Board of Levy County

== Literature ==
- "Whispering Wind", a short story by Frederick Forsyth from The Veteran
- Whispering Wind, a 1957 memoir by Syd Kyle-Little and part of 20th century Australian outback literature
- Whispering Winds of Change: Perceptions of a New World, a 1993 book by Stuart Wilde

== Other ==
- Whispering Wind, a boat which raced in the 1958 Star World Championships
- Whispering Wind, a character in 1998 Hong Kong film The Storm Riders and other related films
- Mountain of the Whispering Winds, a fictional mountain in 1970 Christmas special Santa Claus Is Comin' to Town
