= Old Baldy Council =

Defunct Boy Scouts of America body

Old Baldy Council (#043)
- Owner: Boy Scouts of America
- Headquarters: Ontario, California
- Country: United States
- Founded: 1917
- Defunct: 2006

The Old Baldy Council (#043) was founded in 1917 as the Pomona Council. It changed its name in 1921 to Old Baldy. The Old Baldy name is from Mount San Antonio, often called "Old Baldy" or "Mount Baldy", the highest peak in the San Gabriel Mountains.

On May 1, 2006, Old Baldy Council was dissolved, with the chartered organizations and units reassigned into two neighboring councils. The Sunset District (in Los Angeles County) joined with the San Gabriel Valley Council and the Golden Eagle and Trails End Districts (in San Bernardino County) merged with the California Inland Empire Council.

Greater Los Angeles Area Council (GLAAC) is a new Boy Scouts of America Council made from the merger of the Los Angeles Area Council and the San Gabriel Valley Council, with part of the former Old Baldy Council. The vote to merge was held on March 21, 2015. The new name of the council, Greater Los Angeles Area Council, was announced on June 11, 2015. The new Council will continue with Scouting Service centers in Los Angeles and Pasadena. GLAAC has three Scout shops in Los Angeles, San Pedro and Pasadena. GLAAC operates eight BSA Camps in the greater Los Angeles area.

== Organization ==
Former Districts:

- Golden Eagle District served the towns of Chino, Chino Hills, Ontario, Montclair, and Claremont.
- Trails End District served the towns of Fontana, Rancho Cucamonga and Upland.
- Sunset District served towns of Diamond Bar, Walnut, La Verne, San Dimas, and Pomona

In the San Gabriel Valley Council the area that was formerly Old Baldy Council's Sunset District is now divided and added to expand the Valle Del Sol and Golden Eagle districts. The towns of Diamond Bar, Walnut, and Pomona that were part of the Old Baldy Council's Sunset District, become part of the San Gabriel Valley Council. The former formerly Old Baldy Council's cities of La Verne, San Dimas and Claremont were added to Valle De Sol District of the SGVC.

Old Baldy Council and its Districts held a Scout-0-Rama event each year at the L.A. County Fair grounds. Scout-O-Rama is a large outdoor event where Scouting groups have games, crafts, activities, skill events, displays and more.

== Old Baldy Scout Shop ==
The California Inland Empire Council operates the Old Baldy Scout Shop in the city of Montclair, California to serve the Old Baldy area after the closure of the Ontario shop and Headquarters. The Old Baldy scout shop was closed however in 2021.

== Camps ==
Holcomb Valley Scout Ranch
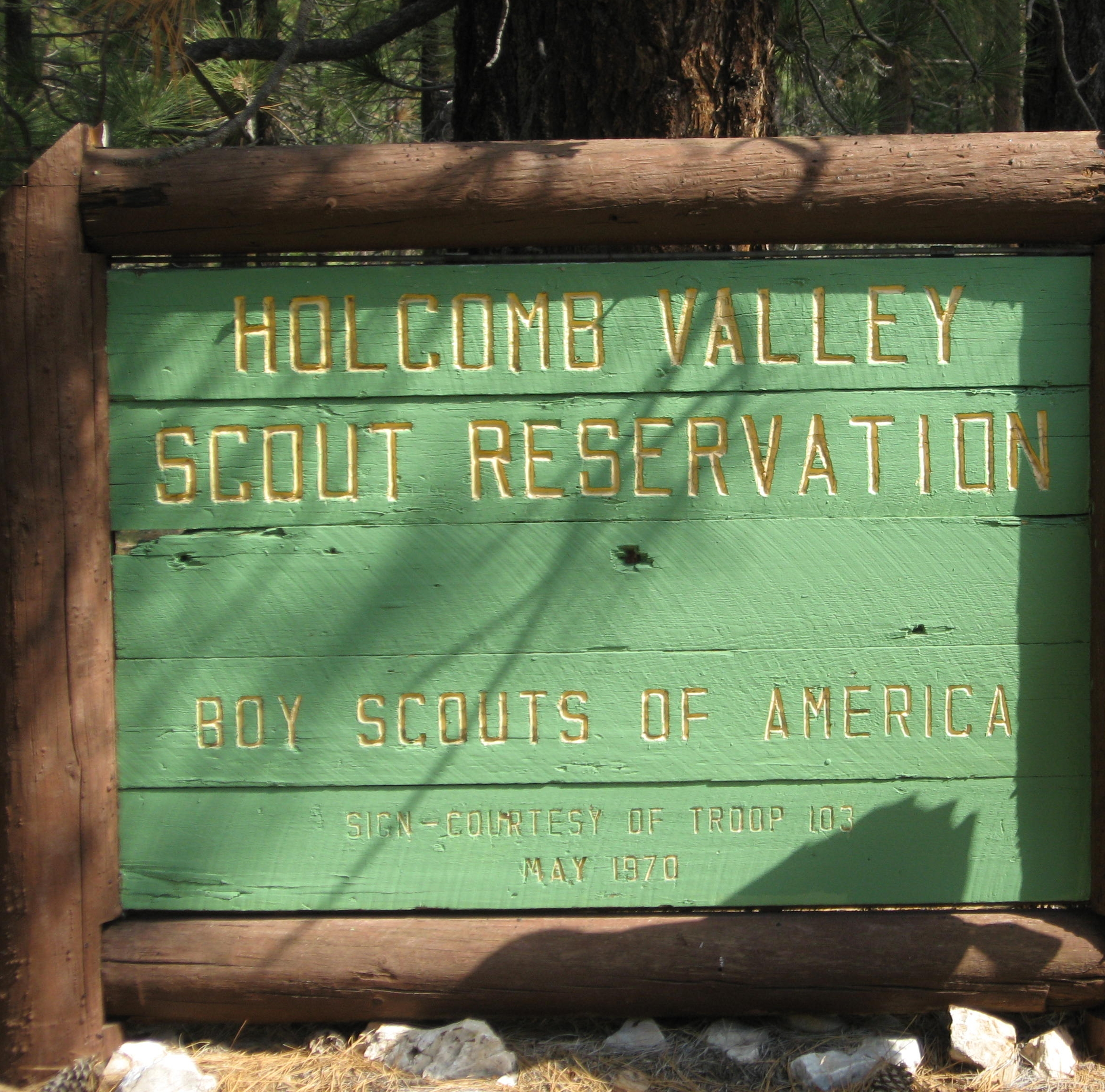
- Location: Fawnskin, California
- Coordinates: 34.3028°N 116.8960°W
- Website www.glaacbsa.org/holcomb

- Holcomb Valley Scout Ranch was opened by the Old Baldy Council in 1974 near Big Bear, the camp was transferred to the San Gabriel Valley Council in 2006.
- Circle B Scout Ranch was closed in 1974 by the Old Baldy Council after the successful opening and operation of Holcomb Valley Scout Ranch. Circle B Scout Ranch was a BSA Summer camp. Buckskin, youth leadership, camps were held there also. The Order of the Arrow's Navajo Lodge was active part of the camp. Opened in the summer of 1954, the camp was just east of Sequoia National Park, off Sherman Peak road, in the southern Sierra Nevada. West of Naval Air Weapons Station China Lake. The camp was at 6,000 feet (1,800 m) elevation and the geographic location coordinates of former camp are 35.976111°N 118.135278°W Circle B replaced the former summer camp of Tulakes located in the Barton Flats area, a camp operated by Old Baldy Council from 1924 until 1953, when they sold their lease to Grayback Council. It was on a 50-year lease from the forest service.

== Order of the Arrow ==
Old Baldy Council had an Order of the Arrow lodge, the Navajo Lodge # 98, that also was moved into the adjacent councils. The Lodge was California's Oldest continuously active OA Lodge, chartered January 17, 1937.

== See also ==
- Scouting in California
- San Gabriel Valley Council
