= Glenard P. Lipscomb =

American politician (1915–1970)

Glen Lipscomb
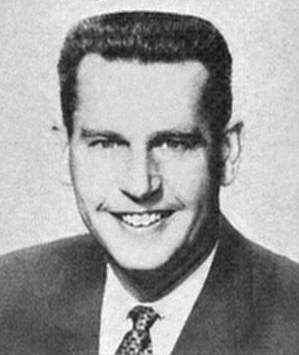
- Lipscomb in 1969

Member of the U.S. House of Representatives from California's 24th district
- In office November 10, 1953 – February 1, 1970
- Preceded by: C. Norris Poulson
- Succeeded by: John H. Rousselot

Member of the California State Assembly from the 56th district
- In office November 25, 1947 – November 10, 1953
- Preceded by: Ernest E. Debs
- Succeeded by: Seth J. Johnson

Personal details
- Born: Glenard Paul Lipscomb; August 19, 1915 Jackson, Michigan, U.S.
- Died: February 1, 1970 (aged 54) Bethesda, Maryland, U.S.
- Resting place: Forest Lawn Memorial Park (Hollywood Hills)
- Party: Republican
- Spouse: Virginia Sognalian Lipscomb (m. 1936)
- Children: 2
- Education: University of Southern California; Woodbury University
- Profession: Accountant

Military service
- Branch/service: United States Army
- Battles/wars: World War II

Glenard Paul (Glen) Lipscomb (August 19, 1915 – February 1, 1970) was a United States Congressman from the state of California from 1953 to 1970.

== Biography ==
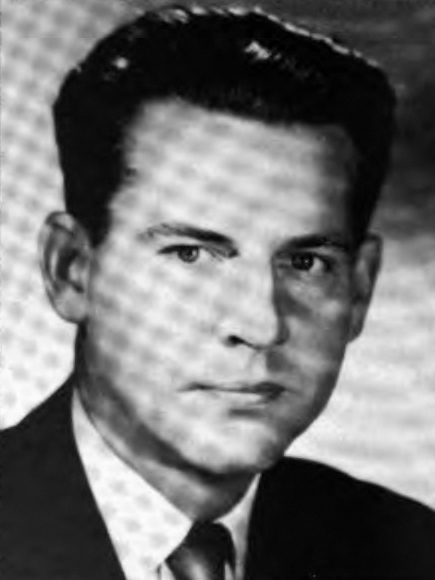
Lipscomb while in the California State Assembly in 1954.

Born in Jackson, Michigan, Lipscomb moved to California with his parents in 1920, where the family settled in Los Angeles. He was educated in the Los Angeles public schools, including Belmont High School (Los Angeles, California). After attending the University of Southern California and Woodbury College (now in Burbank), he became an accountant.

He served in the Army's Financial Corps during World War II and in 1947 was elected to the California State Assembly 56th district, where he served until 1953.

=== Congress ===
That year he won a special election to the U.S. House to replace Norris Poulson (who had been elected mayor of Los Angeles), representing California's twenty-fourth district. Lipscomb voted for the Civil Rights Acts of 1957 and 1960, as well as the 24th Amendment to the U.S. Constitution and the Voting Rights Act of 1965, but voted against the Civil Rights Acts of 1964 and 1968.

=== Death ===
Lipscomb continued to serve in the House for the rest of his life. He died of cancer at Bethesda Naval Hospital at the age of 54 on February 1, 1970 and was interred at Forest Lawn Memorial Park-Hollywood Hills.

=== Family and legacy ===
The submarine USS Glenard P. Lipscomb was named after him.

He was married to Virginia Sognalian Lipscomb, a classmate at Belmont High.

For a short time a BSA camp near Big Bear Lake was named after him: Camp Lipscomb.

== Electoral history ==
Glenard Lipscomb electoral history

Republican Glenard P. Lipscomb won the special election to replace fellow Republican Norris Poulson, who was elected Mayor of Los Angeles. Data for this special election is not available.

1954 United States House of Representatives elections in California, District 24
Party	Candidate	Votes	%
Republican	Glenard P. Lipscomb (inc.)	65,431	56.9
Democratic	George Arnold	49,592	43.1
Total votes		115,023	100.0
Turnout			
Republican hold			

1956 United States House of Representatives elections in California, District 24
Party	Candidate	Votes	%
Republican	Glenard P. Lipscomb (inc.)	84,120	61.9
Democratic	Fay Porter	51,692	38.1
Total votes		135,812	100.0
Turnout			
Republican hold			

1958 United States House of Representatives elections in California, District 24
Party	Candidate	Votes	%
Republican	Glenard P. Lipscomb (inc.)	68,184	56.4
Democratic	William H. Ware, Jr.	52,804	43.6
Total votes		120,988	100.0
Turnout			
Republican hold			

1960 United States House of Representatives elections in California, District 24
Party	Candidate	Votes	%
Republican	Glenard P. Lipscomb (inc.)	82,497	59.7
Democratic	Norman Hass	55,613	40.3
Total votes		138,110	100.0
Turnout			
Republican hold			

1962 United States House of Representatives elections in California, District 24
Party	Candidate	Votes	%
Republican	Glenard P. Lipscomb (inc.)	120,884	70.3
Democratic	Knox Mellon	50,970	29.7
Total votes		171,854	100.0
Turnout			
Republican hold			

1964 United States House of Representatives elections in California, District 24
Party	Candidate	Votes	%
Republican	Glenard P. Lipscomb (inc.)	139,784	67.9
Democratic	Bryan W. Stevens	65,967	32.1
Total votes		205,751	100.0
Turnout			
Republican hold			

1966 United States House of Representatives elections in California, District 24
Party	Candidate	Votes	%
Republican	Glenard P. Lipscomb (inc.)	148,190	76.3
Democratic	Earl G. McNall	46,115	23.7
Total votes		194,305	100.0
Turnout			
Republican hold			

1968 United States House of Representatives elections in California, District 24
Party	Candidate	Votes	%
Republican	Glenard P. Lipscomb (inc.)	152,180	72.8
Democratic	Fred Warner Neal	56,723	27.2
Total votes		208,903	
Republican hold			

== See also ==
- List of members of the United States Congress who died in office (1950–1999)

U.S. House of Representatives
Preceded by C. Norris Poulson	Member of the U.S. House of Representatives from California's 24th congressional district 1953–1970	Succeeded by John H. Rousselot
