= CIEC =

CIEC stands for:

- California Inland Empire Council, a council of the Boy Scouts of America
- International Commission on Civil Status, Commission internationale de l'état civil
