= Over 60 Minutes with Luba =

Greatest hits album by Luba
- Released: 1987
- Recorded: 1979–1987
- Genre: Pop, rock
- Length: 67:54
- Label: Capitol-EMI of Canada

Luba chronology
Between the Earth & Sky (1986)	Over 60 Minutes with Luba (1987)	All or Nothing (1989)

Over 60 Minutes with Luba is a compilation of popular songs from the first three albums on Capitol-EMI of Canada by Canadian singer, Luba and band. Two additional songs appear on this release, including the hit single "The Best Is Yet to Come" which is featured on the motion picture soundtrack for 9½ Weeks and a live version of the Percy Sledge classic "When a Man Loves a Woman". A 12" club mix of the Canadian gold smash "Let It Go" is also included on this album.

== Track listing ==
1. The Best Is Yet To Come – 3:54 (from the soundtrack 9½ Weeks, 1986)
2. When A Man Loves a Woman – 5:03 (previously unreleased)
3. Let It Go [Extended Club Mix] – 6:11 (previously unreleased)
4. Innocent (With An Explanation) – 3:40 (from Between the Earth & Sky, 1986)
5. Act Of Mercy - 5:31 (from Between the Earth & Sky, 1986)
6. Secrets And Sins - 3:41 (from Secrets and Sins, 1984)
7. Even In The Darkest Moments - 3:52 (from Between the Earth & Sky, 1986)
8. How Many - 4:14 (from Between the Earth & Sky, 1986)
9. Sacrificial Heart - 3:31 (from Secrets and Sins, 1984)
10. Storm Before The Calm - 3:28 (from Secrets and Sins, 1984)
11. Everytime I See Your Picture - 4:01 (from Secrets and Sins, 1984)
12. Strength In Numbers - 4:29 (from Between the Earth & Sky, 1986)
13. What You Believe - 4:26 (from Between the Earth & Sky, 1986)
14. Raven's Eyes - 3:22 (from Luba (EP), 1982)
15. Back To Emotion - 4:07 (from Between the Earth & Sky, 1986)
16. Resurrect The Love - 4:24 (from Secrets and Sins, 1984)

== Personnel ==
- Luba: Vocals
- Peter Marunzak: Drums & Drum Programming
- Michael (Bell) Zwonok: Bass & Backing Vocals
- Mark Lyman: Guitar & Backing Vocals
- Michel Corriveau: Keyboards
- Jeff Smallwood: Guitar & Backing Vocals
- The Sherwoods: Backing Vocals

=== Additional musicians ===
- Guitars: Alain Couture, Corrado Rustici
- Bass: Randy Jackson
- Keyboards: Pierre Marchand, Daniel Barbe, Sterling Crew, Preston Glass, Walter Afanasieff
- Drums/Percussion: Daniel Lanois, Narada Michael Walden, Andy Narell, Dick Smith
- Backing Vocals: Alain Couture, Shawne Jackson, Sharon Lee Williams, Daniel Barbe
- Emulator Programming: Alain Simard
- Saxophone: Kenny G on "How Many"
