= LAAC =

LAAC may refer to:

- Los Angeles Athletic Club
- Los Angeles Area Council
- Latin America Amateur Championship
- Lieu d'Art et d'Action Contemporaine, Dunkerque, a museum in France
- Long acting anticholinergic, a type of drug, such as tiotropium
- Left Atrial Appendage Closure
