= On Tour =

On Tour may refer to:

- On Tour (Yann Tiersen album), 2006
- On Tour (Ernest Tubb album), 1962
- On Tour (Trio X album), 2001
- On Tour (1990 film), a 1990 Italian film
- On Tour (2010 film), a 2010 French film
- Guitar Hero: On Tour series, a 2008 video game
- On Tour (song), a song by Bliss n Eso
- On Tour (EP), an EP by Luba
- Sphere On Tour, 1985
