= All or Nothing (Luba album) =

Studio album by Luba
- Released: 1989
- Recorded: 1988–1989
- Genres: Pop rock, classic rock, acoustic
- Length: 49:46
- Label: Capitol-EMI of Canada
- Producers: Joe Chiccarelli & Jimmy Vivino

Luba chronology
Over 60 Minutes with Luba (1987)	All or Nothing (1989)	Luba...Live On Tour (1990)

Professional ratings
Review scores
Source	Rating
Allmusic	3/5 stars

All or Nothing is the third full-length studio release on Capitol-EMI of Canada by Canadian singer, Luba and band. A follow-up to her previous album, Between the Earth & Sky (it was another hit), and achieved platinum status due to hit singles such as "Giving Away a Miracle," "Little Salvation", "No More Words", and "Wild Heart" (produced and includes various instrumental contributions by Tom Petty & The Heartbreakers guitarist Mike Campbell). Pianist and fellow Canadian Paul Shaffer from the Late Show with David Letterman has a solo on the song "As Good As It Gets." Numerous other musicians have contributed to the release as well. This would be the last studio album by Luba for a decade.

== Track listing ==
1. "Wild Heart" – 4:45
2. "On My Way" – 3:58
3. "Giving Away a Miracle" – 4:41
4. "No More Words" – 4:56
5. "As Good As It Gets" - 4:22
6. "Too Much of a Good Thing" - 5:03
7. "Little Salvation" - 3:30
8. "In Trouble Again" - 4:04
9. "Milena" - 5:16
10. "Promise Me Anything" - 4:02
11. "Bringing It All Back Home" - 5:09

== Personnel ==
- Luba: Vocals, Acoustic Guitar
- Jeff Smallwood: Guitars, Mandolin, Pedal Steel, Five String Banjo, Background Vocals
- Michel Corriveau: Organ, Piano, Wurlitzer, Harmonium, Synthesizers, Background Vocals
- Peter Marunzak: Drums, Background Vocals
- Michael (Bell) Zwonok: Bass
- Joe Chiccarelli : Producer, Engineer

=== Additional musicians ===
- Mike Campbell: Guitar, Bass, Keyboards, Mandolin on "Wild Heart"
- Mickey Curry: Drums on "Giving Away a Miracle"
- Seth Glassman: Bass
- Larry Hughes: Background Vocals
- Frank Pagano: Percussion
- Steve Reid: Percussion
- Paul Shaffer: Piano Solo on "As Good As It Gets"
- Dorion Sherwood: Background Vocals
- Bette Sussman: Additional Keyboards on "No More Words"
- Tom Torre: Fiddle on "Wild Heart"
- Jimmy Vivino: Rhythm Guitar on "In Trouble Again," Acoustic Guitar on "Little Salvation," Slide Guitar on "On My Way," Background Vocals
- Peter White: Classical Guitar on "Milena"
