= San Gabriel Valley Council =

Boy Scouts of America council serving Los Angeles County

San Gabriel Valley Council #40
- Owner: Boy Scouts of America
- Headquarters: Pasadena, California
- Location: Los Angeles County
- Country: United States
- Founded: January 1, 1919
- Defunct: July 2015
- Website https://www.glaacbsa.org

Located in Los Angeles County, California's San Gabriel Valley, the Boy Scouts of America's San Gabriel Valley Council (#40) was one of five councils serving Los Angeles County. It was headquartered in Pasadena.

Greater Los Angeles Area Council (GLAAC) is a new Boy Scouts of America Council made from the merger of the Los Angeles Area Council and the San Gabriel Valley Council. The vote to merge was held on March 21, 2015. The new name for the council, Greater Los Angeles Area Council, was announced on June 11, 2015. The new council centers is in Los Angeles. Due to the large size of the two original councils, the merger was a process which was completed over a time span, and finished in 2017.

GLAAC has three Scout shops in Los Angeles, San Pedro and Arcadia. GLAAC operates eight BSA camps in the greater Los Angeles area.

== History ==
With the founding of the BSA in 1910, the first goal of the San Gabriel Valley Scout leaders was to organize as new troops. Paid professionals, many of whom were YMCA leaders, were recruited to spread the new Scouting program. They were sent out into the San Gabriel Valley towns to organize new troops and recruit leaders. By March 1919, there were nine active troops with 190 boys in the SGV. The Pasadena Council (also known as the Pasadena District Council) of the Boy Scouts of America was organized March 3, 1919, with jurisdiction over Pasadena, Altadena and Lamanda Park.

A charter was granted by the BSA National Headquarters dated April 1, 1919 to the Pasadena District Council. Tallman Trask was hired to be the first Scout Executive. He had been a District Executive for the Los Angeles Council. He had also served as Los Angeles' camp director. Prior to joining the BSA, Trask was an executive for the YMCA and had run several camps for them. By October 1, 1919, there were 15 active troops with 299 scouts.

The council's name was changed in 1929 to Pasadena-San Gabriel Valley Council to better reflect the geographic area served by the council. In 1951 the name was changed to San Gabriel Valley Council to shorten it and better identify the 29 cities and towns it served.

== Organization ==
Former districts of the San Gabriel Valley Council:

- Golden Eagle District
  - City of Industry, Hacienda Heights, La Puente, Rowland Heights, West Covina, Valinda, Diamond Bar, Pomona and Walnut
  - The cities of Diamond Bar, Pomona and Walnut were added to Golden Eagle District when Old Baldy Council was split at the Los Angeles–San Bernardino county line on May 1, 2006, and was merged into the San Gabriel Valley Council and California Inland Empire Council.
- Lucky Baldwin District
  - Arcadia, Monrovia, Sierra Madre, Azusa, Bradbury, Duarte, Irwindale, and Temple City
- Mission Amigos District
  - Alhambra, Monterey Park, El Monte, San Gabriel, South San Gabriel and Rosemead
  - The city of Rosemead was part of the former El Camino Real District until 2007.
- Rose Bowl District
  - Altadena, La Cañada Flintridge, Pasadena and San Marino
- Valle De Sol District
  - Covina, Glendora, Charter Oak, La Verne, San Dimas and Claremont
  - The cities of La Verne, San Dimas and Claremont were added to Valle De Sol District when Old Baldy Council was split at the Los Angeles–San Bernardino county line on May 1, 2006, and was merged into San Gabriel Valley Council and California Inland Empire Council.
- A former district called Trails of the Valley District was moved into the Lucky Baldwin District and Mission Amigos District in 2010.
  - Azusa, Baldwin Park, Bradbury, Duarte, Irwindale, El Monte and South El Monte
  - Formerly known as San Gabriel River District
  - The cities of El Monte and South El Monte were part of the former El Camino Real District until 2007.

== Camps ==
- Holt Scout Ranch (now closed) was an SGVC camp located in the San Bernardino Mountains. It was named in honor of Herbert Brayton Holt on June 15, 1968. The camp was previously known as Camp Cedar Canyon, and opened in 1955. In 1975, it was sold to a private party. The camp was located off SR-38. 34.0907°N 116.96684°W The fire access road, which started at the hairpin curve on SR-38 connected to the camp entrance road. Just before the camp entrance (where the camp director's home was located), the fire access road forked to the left to make its way up the mountain. A picture of "Old Dobbs" is on many Holt Scout Ranch items.
- Camp Eaton (now closed) was formerly called Camp Cumorah Crest. It had five conference rooms; a dining hall; winterized dormitories for 125; and facilities for pool, softball, and basketball. It was located in the San Gabriel Mountains, part of the Angeles National Forest, off Hwy 2, the Angeles Crest Highway, on Sulphur Spring Road near Mt. Wilson. It was more of a conference center than a camp. It was sold when the SGVC started operating the camp at Holcomb Valley in 2005. It was named Camp Eaton, for the support of the camp from the Eaton family operators of the Forest Lawn Memorial Parks in Southern California.34.3485°N 117.984°W
- Camp Huntington (now closed), opened in 1920, was at the mouth of Rubio Canyon. Many scouts would take the Pacific Electric street cars (the Red Car) and then hike to camp. The camp was started by Henry Huntington. The camp was near entrance Rubio Pavilion of the Mount Lowe Railway, closed in 1938. By the early 1960s, the city's population had expanded and there were houses built right up to the camp's fence line. It was decided to close the camp, as it was now in the town of Altadena.34.203025°N 118.122883°W
- Camp San Antonio (now closed) was opened on Mount Baldy until 1970. Because of the closing of Catalina Island during World War II, there was a need for a summer camp close to the council, so this camp was opened. It was located just south of the current Manker Flats Campground at 6,300 feet. Camp San Antonio was closed in the 1970s.34.2622272°N 117.6336658°W

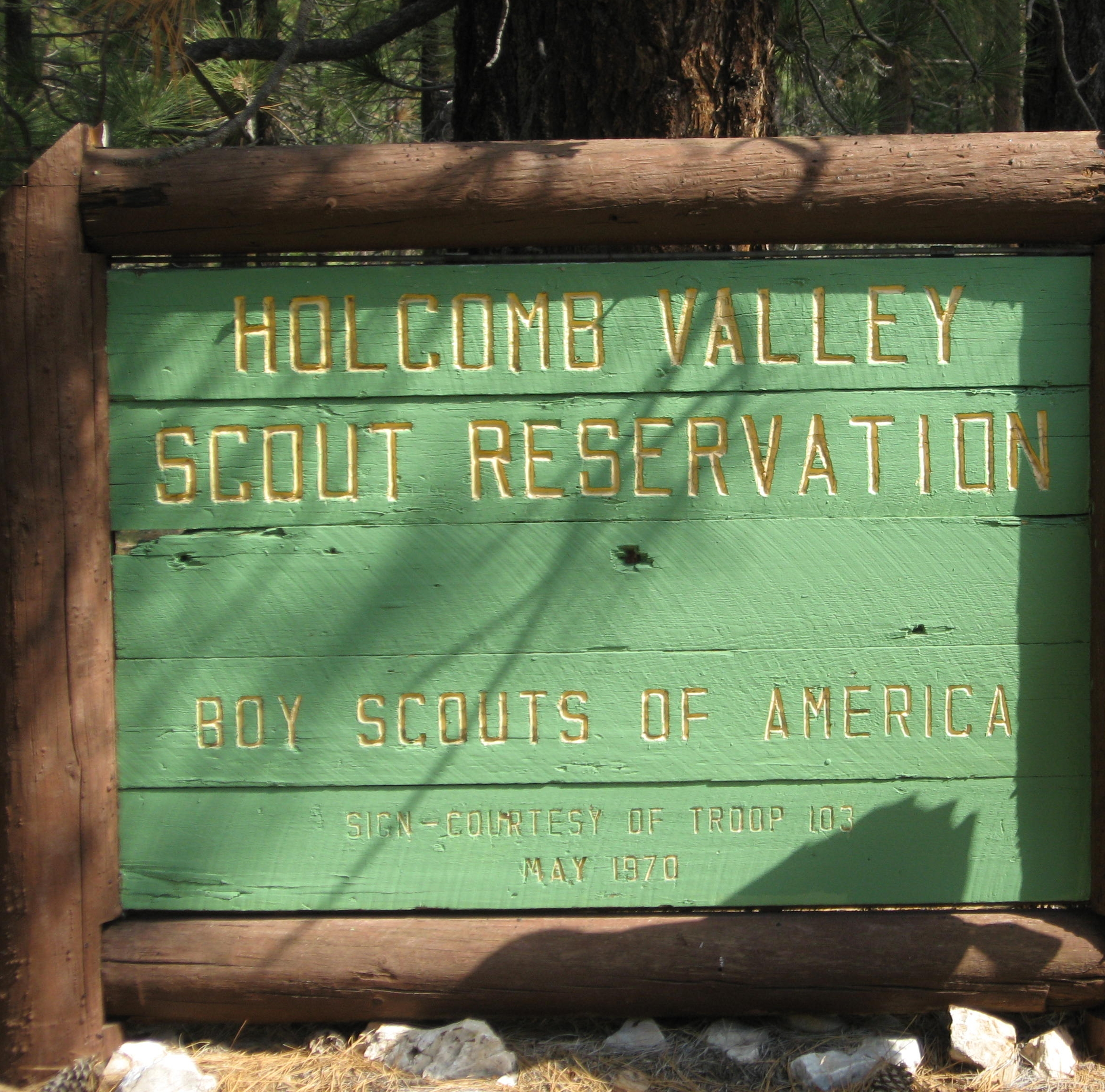
Former Holcomb Valley Scout Ranch

- Holcomb Valley Scout Ranch (now closed) was a BSA camp, at 7,500 feet (2,300 m) elevation, located north of Big Bear Lake in the old mining district of Belleville in the Holcomb Valley on the site of the old Hitchcock Ranch. The ranch is north of the town of Fawnskin. The camp offered a week-long Oak Badge-National Youth Leadership Training class, and offered a Boy Scout summer resident camp until 2012, when the program was ended. The camp was closed a few years later. One hike offered is to the Big Bear Discovery Center. Cougar Crest hike to Bertha Peak gives views of Big Bear Lake. Spring creek trail offers a more level long hike. South of the camp, not far away, is the Pacific Crest Trail. To the east and near the camp is the public USFS Holcomb Valley Camp Ground.

Holcomb Valley Scout Ranch was formerly part of Old Baldy Council. The Scout Ranch was turned over to the San Gabriel Valley Council in 2005. The Old Baldy Council took title to the property in 1965 from William Hitchcock. The Hitchcock Ranch is still part of the Holcomb Valley Scout Ranch. Guy Reide, Old Baldy's Scout Executive (1949–1966), in 1965 worked with William Hitchcock to have the ranch turned into a Scout camp. Loren Baldwin became the first camp ranger, and Holcomb Valley held its first Boy Scout summer resident camp in 1974. The camp is named after William F. Holcomb, who discovered gold there and staked a claim in May 1860 with his partner. Holcomb became known for his marksmanship. After 10 years of prospecting he still had no major success. As food sources were diminishing, some of the prospectors hired Holcomb to hunt for grizzly bear to provide food for the long winter months. While trailing a bear up Polique Canyon he found Holcomb Valley. Tracking the injured animal, he passed a quartz ledge shining with gold.

Many western films and TV shows were shot in Holcomb Valley. For a short time under Old Baldy Council the camp was called "Camp Lipscomb" after US Congressman Glenard P. Lipscomb.

=== Trask Scout Reservation ===
Trask Scout Reservation
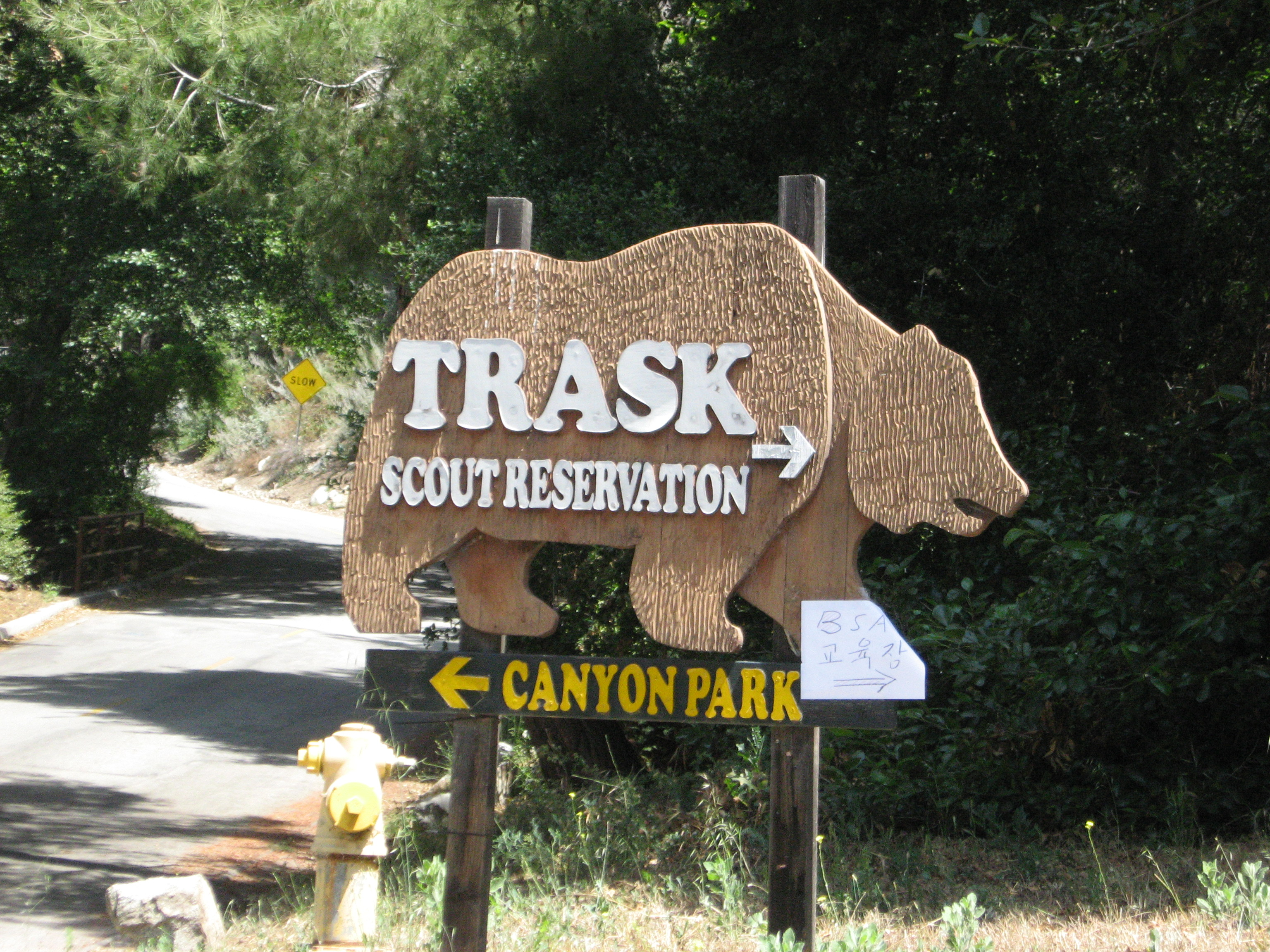
- Location: Monrovia, California
- Coordinates: 34.1919°N 117.9625°W
- Website https://www.glaacbsa.org/trask

Trask Scout Reservation is in Monrovia, California in the foothills of the San Gabriel Mountains. It is located above the sawpit dam off of Monrovia Canyon Park. Camp Trask offers Cub Scout programs, family camp programs and Boy Scout programs on a year-round basis. The camp has a full size fort used for many program activities, called Fort Rotary. The camp is in a riparian zone ecosystem. The canyon stream and the camp are shaded by deciduous trees, white alders and bigleaf maples, evergreen canyon and coast live oaks.

==== History ====
Originally known as Monrovia Scout Reservation, Camp Trask was purchased in 1966. The camp was dedicated as Tallman H. Trask Scout Reservation on May 13, 1972.

=== Camp Cherry Valley ===
Camp Cherry Valley
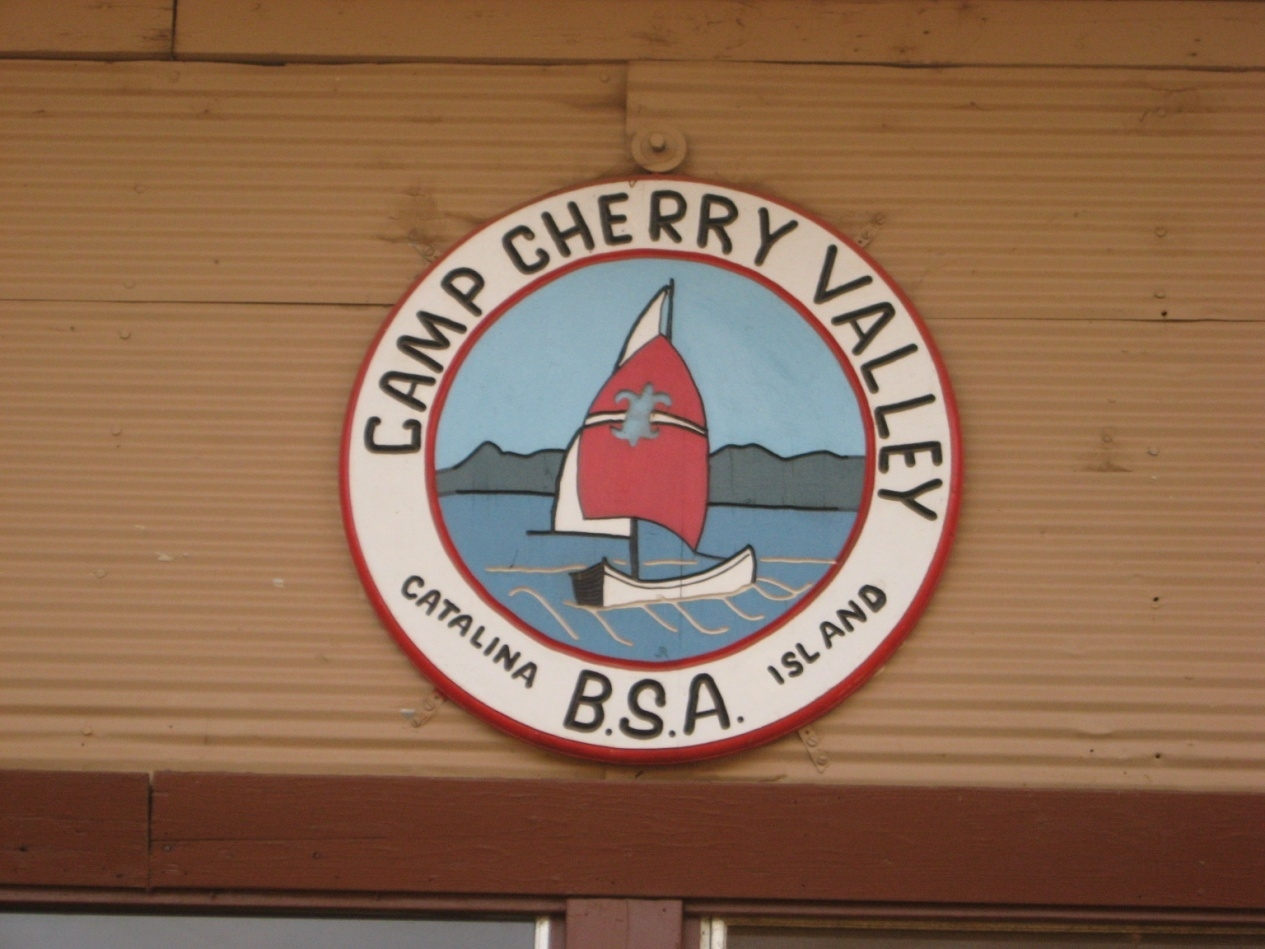
- Location: Santa Catalina Island, California
- Coordinates: 33.4503°N 118.503°W
- Website http://www.sgvcbsa.org/programs/camping/camp-cherry-valley

Camp Cherry Valley is a summer camp on the leeward side of Catalina Island, California, which is owned and operated by the Greater Los Angeles Area Council of the Boy Scouts of America. It is located two coves north of Two Harbors at Cherry Cove. The camp, valley, and cove get their name from the Catalina cherry trees native to the island. It also offers non-scouting programs on a year-round basis.

== Ta Tanka Lodge ==
Ta Tanka Lodge
- Headquarters: Pasadena, California
- Location: Los Angeles County
- Country: United States
- Founded: May 31, 1952
- Defunct: 2016
- Founders: E. Urner Goodman; Carroll A. Edson
- Website http://www.tatankalodge.org/

The San Gabriel Valley Council's Order of the Arrow lodge was the Ta Tanka Lodge (#488). In 2016 the Ta Tanka Lodge merged with the Siwinis OA Lodge to form the new lodge: Tuku'ut. Its totem is the Saber-Toothed Cat. Ta Tanka Lodge started with 120 members who chose the Sioux word ta tanka meaning "bull buffalo" as its name and as their totem a white buffalo.

The Order of the Arrow (OA) is the national honor society of the Boy Scouts of America (BSA). The OA's Ta Tanka Lodge has three goals: recognize outstanding Scouts, promote BSA camping and provide cheerful service to the SGVC, including its districts, Packs and Troops.

Since 1933 the Ta Tanka Lodge has hosted a weekend campout on the weekend after Thanksgiving, called Desert Caravan, held in various campgrounds in the Mojave Desert. Caravan was later moved to Labor Day weekend camp at Camp Holcomb Valley. Caravan is open to troops and families of the SGVC with events like treasure hunt, team games, dutch oven cobbler cook-off, chili cook-off and a campfire program.

Ta Tanka Lodge has four local chapters:

- Hunkpapa— Lucky Baldwin and Mission Amigos Districts
- Kiowa — Golden Eagle District
- Oglala Lakota — Rose Bowl District
- Teton Dakota — Valle Del Sol District

== See also ==
- Scouting in California
- Boy Scouts of America centennial
