= From the Bitter to the Sweet =

From The Bitter To The Sweet

Studio album by Luba
- Released: 2000
- Recorded: 1999
- Genre: Indie pop, soul
- Length: 50:11
- Label: Azure Music
- Producer: Borza Ghomeshi & Eric Lange

Luba chronology
| Luba...Live On Tour (1990) | From The Bitter To The Sweet (2000) | ICON (2014) |

From the Bitter to the Sweet is the latest release by Canadian singer Luba. A primarily solo work on her own label and her first in more than a decade, it did not produce as many sales or as much radio airplay as her previous albums. These songs are much more subdued than in earlier works, possibly due to her recent hard times. However, the album still won some critical acclaim. Featured singles include "Sorry," "Is She a Lot Like Me" and "Let Me Be the One."

== Track listing ==
1. Sorry – 5:05
2. Is She a Lot Like Me – 4:26
3. Let Me Be the One – 4:50
4. All Over Again – 4:51
5. Sooner Than Soon - 4:40
6. How Can I Trust You Now - 4:53
7. Inside Out - 4:22
8. From the Bitter to the Sweet - 4:41
9. I Am What I Am - 3:59
10. What Would It Take - 5:45
11. Anything At All - 2:39

== Personnel ==
- Luba: vocals, acoustic guitar
- Rick Haworth: electric guitar, octave mandolin
- Norman DiBlasio: piano, keyboards, drum programming
- Kevin DeSouza: bass
- Eric Lange: drums, percussion
- Don Meunier: classical and acoustic guitar
- Ligia Paquin: viola
- François Pilon: violin
- Sheila Hannigan: cello

=== Additional musicians ===
- Andrew Creegan: percussion, dulcimer on "Let Me Be the One"
- Pat Sheehan: acoustic and electric Guitars on "From the Bitter to the Sweet"
- Borza Ghomeshi: electric guitar on "I Am What I Am"
