= Chain Reaction (Luba album) =

Studio album by Luba
- Released: 1980
- Recorded: 1979
- Genre: Pop, new wave, rock n roll
- Length: 37:10
- Label: TGO
- Producer: Tony Green

Luba chronology
Любомира (1977)	Chain Reaction (1980)	Luba (EP) (1982)

Chain Reaction is the only album by Canadian band Luba featuring Luba Kowalchyk as vocalist. It was produced by Tony Green for his own label. The album contains songs in the early New Wave music style. It was made available on compact disc in 1996.

Note that initially Luba was the name of the band and not Luba Kowalchyk's stage name. In 1982, Luba Kowalchyk was signed by Capitol Records as the artist Luba and the remaining members served as her backup band.

== Track listing ==
1. Chain Reaction – 3:37
2. Runaround – 3:42
3. I Stand Alone – 4:53
4. Heaven In Your Eyes – 3:39
5. Lookin' At Love - 4:02
6. Stay - 5:03
7. Have A Heart - 3:29
8. Lovers In The Night - 3:42
9. Seems Like A Dream - 6:04
10. Black & White - 3:01

== Personnel ==
- Luba: Vocals
- Peter Marunzak: Drums
- Michael (Bell) Zwonok: Bass
- John Nestorowich: Rhythm Guitar, Vocals
- Mark Lyman: Lead & Rhythm Guitar
- Doug Short: Keyboards
