= Greater Los Angeles Area Council =

Council of the Boy Scouts of America in California

Greater Los Angeles Area Council (#33)
- Owner: Boy Scouts of America
- Headquarters: Los Angeles and Pasadena
- Country: United States
- Founded: 2015
- Membership: Los Angeles Area Council and San Gabriel Valley Council
- Website www.glaacbsa.org

Greater Los Angeles Area Council (GLAAC) is a Boy Scouts of America Council created from the merger of the Los Angeles Area Council and the San Gabriel Valley Council. The vote to merge was held on March 21, 2015. The new name for the Council, Greater Los Angeles Area Council, was announced on June 11, 2015. The new Council will continue with Scouting Service centers in Los Angeles and Pasadena. GLAAC has three Scout shops located in Downtown Los Angeles, San Pedro, and Pasadena. Also in Pasadena is a local service center. GLAAC operates seven camps in the greater Los Angeles area. Due to the large size of the two original councils, the merger was a process that was completed over a time span, and completed in 2017.

== History ==
| San Gabriel Valley Council #40; Founded 1919 | Los Angeles Area Council #33; Founded 1915 |
| Greater Los Angeles Area Council #33; Merged July, 2015 |

=== Los Angeles Area Council ===
Founded in 1915, the Los Angeles Area Council (LAAC) (#033) served most of the City of Los Angeles as well as several other cities in the greater Los Angeles area. It was one of five Boy Scouts of America councils in Los Angeles County, California. Since its founding in 1915, the Los Angeles Area Council served millions of youth, 54,567 youth in 2008.

The Los Angeles Area Council was founded in 1915 as the Centinela Council, changing its name in 1925 to the Los Angeles Council. In 1934 the San Antonio District (#046), founded in 1922; and the South Pasadena Council (#067), founded in 1927 merged into the LAC, with the name of the organization changing to the Los Angeles Metropolitan Area Council. The council name changed to LAAC in 1945. The LAAC was one of the first councils organized in the United States and is one of the largest councils still in existence.

=== San Gabriel Valley Council ===
Located in Los Angeles County, California's San Gabriel Valley, the Boy Scouts of America's San Gabriel Valley Council (#40) was one of five councils serving Los Angeles County, headquartered in Pasadena. With the founding of the BSA in 1910, the first goal of the San Gabriel Valley Scout leaders was to organize as new troops. Paid professionals, many of whom were YMCA leaders, were recruited to help start new Troops and spread the new Scouting program. They were sent out into the San Gabriel Valley towns to organize new troops and recruit leaders. By March 1919, there were nine active troops with 190 boys in the San Gabriel Valley. The Pasadena Council (also known as the Pasadena District Council) of the Boy Scouts of America was organized March 3, 1919, with jurisdiction over Pasadena, Altadena and Lamanda Park.

A charter was granted by the BSA National Headquarters dated April 1, 1919, to the Pasadena District Council. Tallman Trask was hired to be the first Scout Executive. Trask had been a District Executive for the Los Angeles Council. He had also served as Los Angeles' Camp Director. Prior to joining the BSA, Trask was an executive for the YMCA and had run several camps for them. By October 1, 1919, there were 15 active troops with 299 Scouts. The east part of the San Gabriel Valley Council came from the dissolved Old Baldy Council on May 1, 2006.

== Camps ==
- Camp Cherry Valley
- Camp Trask
- Firestone Scout Reservation
- Cabrillo Beach Youth Waterfront Sports Center
- Hubert Eaton Scout Reservation (renamed from Forest Lawn Scout Reservation in 2017)
- Log Cabin Wilderness Camp
- ~~Camp Holcomb Valley~~ (closed)

== Order of the Arrow ==
On March 16, 2016, the Ta Tanka OA Lodge of the San Gabriel Valley Council and the Siwinis OA Lodge of the Los Angeles Area Council voted and agreed on a new Lodge name and totem for the new Lodge of the Greater Los Angeles Area Council. The new Lodge is Tuku'ut and the totem is the Saber-Toothed Cat. The Order of the Arrow (OA) is the national honor society of the Boy Scouts of America. The OA provides leadership and service experience to OA Scouts.

Tuku'ut Chapters - Districts:

Huunut - San Gabriel Valley
Kangee - Pio Pico
Lakota - Pacifica
Los Lobos - El Camino Real
Nashoba - Metropolitan
Ogalala Lakota - Rose Bowl

== Districts ==
The Greater Los Angeles Area Council is administratively divided into districts to serve Scouts in an area.

- El Camino Real District
- Metropolitan District
- Pacifica District
- Pio Pico District
- Rose Bowl District
- San Gabriel Valley District

== See also ==
- Scouting in California
