= Luba (singer) =

Canadian singer (born 1958)

- Also known as: Luba, Lubomyra
- Born: Lubomyra Kowalchyk; 24 April 1958 (age 68); Montreal, Canada
- Genres: Pop; rock; pop rock; soul; R&B; Ukrainian folk; Caribbean calypso
- Occupations: Musician, singer-songwriter
- Instruments: Piano; guitar; flute
- Years active: 1978–1990; 2000–2001; 2007–present
- Labels: Capitol-EMI of Canada; Azure Music (Maple Music distribution); Universal Music
- Formerly of: Via Zorya, Luba (band)

Luba (born Lubomyra Kowalchyk (Ukrainian: Любомира Ковальчук), 24 April 1958) is a Canadian musician, singer, songwriter, and recording artist from Montreal. She was professionally active from 1980 to 1990, 2000 to 2001, and is active again as of 2007. At the beginning of her career, Luba performed with the traditional Ukrainian music group Via Zorya, with whom she released a self-titled album in 1973. In the 1980s, she sang with her own band, Luba, which released the album Chain Reaction in 1980. She went on to have a solo career using the mononym Luba. Two of her albums have been certified Platinum by the Canadian music industry (for sales in excess of 100,000 units). She has had nine top-40 hits on the Canadian pop charts. Her most successful song is a cover of Percy Sledge's "When a Man Loves a Woman", which reached number 6 on the Canadian pop chart and number 3 on the Canadian adult contemporary chart, in 1987.

Luba is a three-time winner of the Canadian music industry Juno award for Female Vocalist of the Year (1985–1987). Her success is limited to her native Canada, as she has never charted in the US or elsewhere. In addition to her Juno awards, Luba has also received CASBY and Félix Awards, and a Black Music Association Award for Female Entertainer of the Year. Throughout her career, Luba has released seven studio albums, two EPs, two compilation albums, and multiple singles.

== Biography ==
=== Early life ===
Luba Kowalchyk was born in Montreal, Quebec, Canada in 1958 to Ukrainian immigrant parents. Growing up, she studied piano, guitar, flute, and voice. During her teens, she traveled across Canada to perform traditional Ukrainian folk songs at weddings and festivals.

=== Early career ===
In 1975, then known as Lubomyra Kowalchyk, Luba released an album with a musical ensemble called Via Zorya. The record, Zorya, was released by the label Yevshan and featured traditional Ukrainian folk songs in new arrangements. Two years later, Luba released her first solo album, called Lubomyra, via SAGE Promotions. It again featured Ukrainian folk songs, but this time mixed with elements of jazz, blues, and rock. Both Ukrainian albums featured her future drummer Peter Marunzak. With high production values, Luba's Ukrainian recordings raised the bar for this music genre in the diaspora, setting a standard that was followed by artists such as Kvitka Cisyk and Darka & Slavko. Luba released a single in French in 1979 called "Le Doux Rendez-vous", through the Bobinason label. A year prior, she had formed a band under her first name, Luba. Their debut album, Chain Reaction, was released on an independent label in 1980 and received only minimal interest outside of their native Montreal.

=== Breakthrough in Canada ===
Luba enjoyed her greatest success in Canada between 1983 and 1987. Capitol-EMI signed her as a solo artist under the mononym Luba in 1982, and she released a self-titled EP that year, followed by the top-40 hit "Every time I See Your Picture" in early 1983. In 1984, Luba issued the album Secrets and Sins. It spawned the singles "Let It Go" and "Storm Before the Calm", both of which reached the Canadian top-40 charts. Luba earned her first Canadian music industry Juno award for Female Vocalist of the Year in 1985. Later the same year, she recorded several songs written by Stephen Lunt, Jon Stroll, and Kevin Gillis for the first season of the Canadian cartoon series The Raccoons. Several of these songs were later re-recorded by Lisa Lougheed for use in subsequent seasons. Two of Luba's songs are featured on the 1986 soundtrack to 9½ Weeks, a film starring Kim Basinger and Mickey Rourke. In 1986, Luba released Between the Earth & Sky, which included the single "How Many (Rivers to Cross)". This top-20 Canadian hit represented Canada at the 1985 World Popular Song Festival in Tokyo, Japan and made the finals. Also in 1986, Luba won her second Juno as Canada's best female vocalist. In 1987, Luba published Over 60 Minutes with Luba, a compilation of her hits with one new track, a live recording of "When a Man Loves a Woman". This track would become her biggest Canadian hit, peaking at number 6 on the RPM top 100. She would cap the year with her third Best Female Vocalist Juno.

=== All or Nothing; breaking into the US ===
By 1988, Luba's music was being played mainly in Canada, and her label brought in new management to promote her work in the United States. Her next album, All or Nothing, was recorded over a year and half across seven studios, using various session musicians. Released in the fall of 1989, the album included the singles "Giving Away a Miracle", "No More Words", and "Little Salvation". Her band recorded an acoustic, live-in-the-studio show in Toronto, which was released as Live on Tour in 1990. All or Nothing appeared on the RPM Top 100 chart that year and reached platinum status in Canada. With few sales in the US, her label then dropped her before the end of the year.

=== Withdrawal from music ===
During the 1990s, Luba experienced both professional and personal problems that resulted in her withdrawing from the music industry. In 1990, her marriage to band drummer and manager Peter Marunzak ended in divorce. Following her release from Capitol Records, she struggled to land a contract with another major record label. Her grandmother and then her mother both died, while her sister and only relative left in Canada, developed multiple sclerosis that required intensive care. Finally, Luba felt she was missing out on a regular life from years of long hours in the music industry. Altogether, she decided to put her career on hold and focus on other priorities. Luba's most notable performance during the 1990s was as the featured halftime performer at the 1991 Grey Cup game in Winnipeg, Manitoba.

=== Return ===
The latest album by Luba, From the Bitter to the Sweet, was released in 2000 on her own label, Azure Music. While it won some critical acclaim and produced the top-30 single "Is She a Lot Like Me?", it did not match the sales or radio airplay of her earlier work. At year's end, Luba was featured in a concert performance on a Canadian program entitled An Evening with the Stars, where she sang both new and old material.

Two new songs by Luba appeared on a member music page of the popular social networking site MySpace. One was a ballad called "Heaven", and the other, more upbeat, was titled "Time".

Luba moved from Canada in mid-2007 and currently lives in Anguilla.

On 18 February 2014, a new compilation album, titled ICON, was released by Universal Music Canada. It contains remastered versions of hits from her albums Secrets and Sins, Between the Earth & Sky, All or Nothing, and From the Bitter to the Sweet, as well as the track "Heaven". In August of that year, she performed her first live concert in fourteen years, at the Fierté Montréal festival.

On 13 August 2014, Luba performed at Et si l'amour, a free pride concert in Montreal. Luba stated, "I've also wanted to perform at a gay pride event for the longest time because my gay fans are some of my most dedicated fans, who stuck by me through the lean years. The gay community also loves survivors with big voices, and I fit the bill. It hasn't been a charmed career or a charmed life."

== Awards ==
Luba remains one of the more successful female artists in Canadian music history. Her three consecutive Juno awards for Female Vocalist of the Year put her in select company: only Anne Murray (9) and Celine Dion (6) have won more.

== Discography ==
=== Studio albums ===
- Zorya (1973) – with the musical ensemble Via Zorya (Віа Зоря)
- Любомира (1975)
- Chain Reaction (with her band, Luba – 1980)
- Secrets and Sins (1984)
- Between the Earth & Sky (1986)
- All or Nothing (1989)
- From the Bitter to the Sweet (2000)

=== EPs ===
- Luba (1982)
- On Tour (1990)

=== Compilations ===
- Over 60 Minutes with Luba (1987)
- ICON (2014)

=== Singles ===
Release date	Title	Chart peak		Album
Release date	Title	Canada	Canada A/C	Album
1975	"Kazka"			Любомира
1979	"Le Doux Rendez-vous"			
1980	"Chain Reaction"			Chain Reaction
1983	"Every time I See Your Picture"	23		Luba
1983	"Scarlet Letter"			Luba
1983	"Raven's Eyes"			Luba
1984	"Let It Go"	32		Secrets and Sins
1985	"Storm Before the Calm"	37	13	Secrets and Sins
1985	"Secrets and Sins"	95		Secrets and Sins
1985	"Sacrificial Heart"			Secrets and Sins
1986	"The Best Is Yet to Come"			9½ Weeks Soundtrack
1986	"How Many (Rivers to Cross)"	14		Between the Earth & Sky
1986	"Innocent (With an Explanation)"	61		Between the Earth & Sky
1986	"Strength in Numbers"	75		Between the Earth & Sky
1987	"Act of Mercy"	90		Between the Earth & Sky
1987	"When a Man Loves a Woman"	6	3	Over 60 Minutes with Luba
1989	"Giving Away a Miracle"	9		All or Nothing
1990	"Little Salvation"	11		All or Nothing
1990	"No More Words"	33	24	All or Nothing
2000	"Is She a Lot Like Me"	29	20	From the Bitter to the Sweet
2000	"Let Me Be the One"			From the Bitter to the Sweet

=== Other songs ===
- "Ain't No Planes" (1985) – from the cartoon series The Raccoons
- "Hang On, Hold On" (1985) – from The Raccoons
- "All Life Long" (1985) – duet with Curtis King Jr., from The Raccoons
- "Here I Go Again" (1985) – duet with Curtis King Jr., from The Raccoons
- "Keeping Track" (1987) – duet with Dorian Sherwood, appears in the 1987 movie of the same name
