= Camp Joe Scherman =

Camping and recreation facility in California

Coordinates: 33.647305°N 116.593652°W

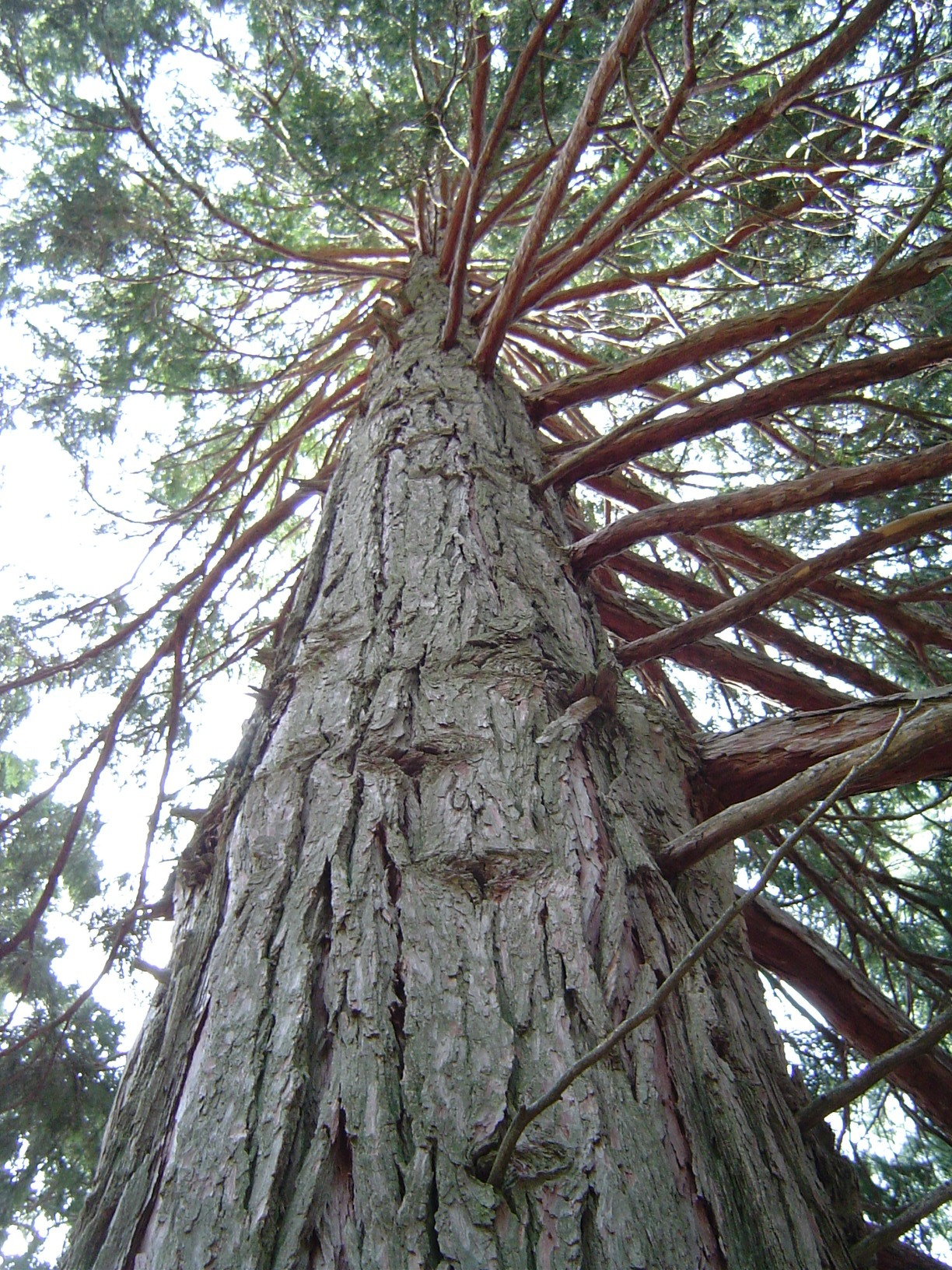
California incense cedar (Calocedrus decurrens) in the San Jacinto Mountains.

Camp Joe Scherman (often abbreviated Camp Scherman) is a 700-acre (2.8 km^{2}) camping and recreation facility owned and operated by the Girl Scout Council of Orange County (GSCOC) located off the Pines to Palms Highway in Riverside County in Southern California.

The camp is in the southern San Jacinto Mountains, at 5,500 feet (1,700 m) in elevation. The scenic property features rolling foothills of California montane chaparral and woodlands habitats below Pine Mountain, a junior Olympic-size pool, two ponds, and miles of trails for hiking and exploring.

Campers' activities include backpacking, sailing, canoeing, archery, horseback riding, swimming, arts and crafts, nature exploration, camping skills, games, drama, rock climbing, campfires, and outdoor cooking.

== History ==
The land was originally the homeland the Cahuilla Indians, and many locations in the camp have names derived from the Cahuilla language.

Joe Scherman (born 1902) was California's first state forest ranger for Orange County and was intimately involved in GSCOC's purchase of the property upon which Camp Scherman was established. All 700 acres (2.8 km^{2}) were originally owned by James Wellman, a somewhat legendary big-game hunter and good friend of Joe Scherman's. Scherman helped negotiate with Wellman for the property, and in 1959, the first 560 acres (2.3 km^{2}) were purchased for $96,500. Eighteen years later, in 1977, the final 140 acres (0.57 km^{2}) were purchased from the Wellman family to complete the property within Camp Scherman today. As of 29 October 2026, GSOC officially announced that they will not operate weekend camp, summer resident camp, or third-party camp programs at Camp Scherman's mountain center property during MY27. No permanent decisions about the future of programs hosted at Camp Scherman have been announced.

== Units ==
=== Upper Camp ===
Upper Camp refers to the part of camp up the hill from Morris Ranch Road, the main road through camp. The Upper Camp portion contains the main kitchen that serves the entire camp. Due to lack of enrollment, Upper Camp is not currently being used as a unit for campers, but facilities like the dining hall are used on occasion. Programs such as field archery with a compound bow are often hosted in Upper Camp as it provides an open space.

==== Keeway ====
Keeway means "North Wind". The unit consists of two-sided rustic cabins with six bunks on each side. It shares a biffy and a shelter with Wabanino. The shelter is unenclosed. Keeway borders the dirt road from TC-4, making it very easy to access from anywhere in camp. Two trailheads lead away from Keeway; one goes to Kitchiwani and the other goes to Adoette.

==== Kitchiwani ====
Kitchiwani is a portmanteau of "Kitchino" and "Shawani", which mean South and West Wind. Kitchiwani, often called Kitchi, is the only unit in camp that has both tents and cabins. The cabins are rustic, two-sided cabins with six bunks on each side. The tents are platform tents which sleep eight campers in cots with mattresses. The Kitchi shelter is unenclosed. It also contains a costume closet, which is used for theater units. A stage is set up on the grass and props and costumes from the Kitchi closet are used. Kitchiwani is adjacent to TC-4, and is the first unit campers see upon arrival there. It is very centrally located and provides easy access to the rest of camp. Two trailheads lead away from Kitchiwani: one goes to Keeway/Wabanino and the other goes to Morris Ranch Rd., the main road through camp.

==== Pa Solé ====
Pa Solé means "Sitters on the Hill". Pa Solé, often called Paso, is made up of rustic cabins with four bunks. The shelter is unenclosed. Due to a lack of water pressure, Paso is not currently being used as a unit for campers, but is sometimes used for special events. Pa Solé sits at the top of the steepest hill in camp, just up the hill from the Dining Hall, Health Center, Holly Tree, and the Ark, as well as Ribbonwood and Snoqualamie. Despite its proximity to these buildings, Pa Solé is not easily accessible from the rest of camp due to the hill one must climb to reach it. A major trailhead leads away from Paso, which splits into the Sr. Loop Trail, 6064, and Red Rock.

==== Ribbonwood ====
Ribbonwood is named for the tree of the same name, which is very prevalent in the area, whose bark peels away in long ribbons. Ribbonwood consists of platform tents with four beds each. Ribbonwood shares its fully enclosed shelter with Snoqualamie, and the biffy is attached to the shelter. Ribbonwood is just past the flagpole, near the Dining Hall, Holly Tree, and Health Center. A trailhead leads away from Ribbonwood to an off-property rock-climbing program area.

==== Snoqualmie ====
Snoqualmie means "Moon People". Snoqualmie, often referred to as Snoq, is made up of rustic cabins with eight bunks each. The shelter, which it shares with Ribbonwood, is fully enclosed, and the biffy is attached. Snoqualamie is very close to the Dining Hall, Health Center, and Holly Tree, as well as the main dirt road which runs through Upper Camp. Because of its accessibility and convenience to the rest of camp, Snoqualmie is usually used for younger campers. Campers who stay there are often referred to as "Snoqers".

==== Wabanino ====
Wabanino means "East Wind", and is often referred to as Waba. The unit consists of two-sided rustic cabins with six bunks on each side. It shares a biffy and a shelter with Keeway. The shelter is unenclosed. Wabanino borders the dirt road from TC-4, making it very easy to access from anywhere in camp. Two trailheads lead away from Wabanino: one goes to Kitchiwani and the other goes to Adoette.

==== Whispering Winds ====
Whispering Winds is made up of eight-person rustic cabins. The shelter is enclosed, and the biffy is attached. It lies just off the main road, downhill a bit from the Dining Hall. Its accessibility to the road makes it very easy to get anywhere in camp very quickly.

==== Wyeena ====
Wyeena is a platform tent unit, with four girls to a tent. It has a small unenclosed shelter. Wyeena is past Whispering Winds, set far back in the canyon. It is not very accessible, and therefore it takes a while to get most places in camp. Rattlesnake Trail leads away from Wyeena towards the Dining Hall.

=== Lower Camp ===
Lower Camp refers to the part of camp downhill from Morris Ranch Rd., the main road through camp. It contains most of the program areas.

==== Adoette ====
Adoette means "Big Trees". The unit consists of two-sided rustic cabins with six bunks on each side. Adoette, often referred to as Ado, has its own enclosed shelter, but shares a biffy with nearby Tawasi. Ado is mainly used for horseback riding units, due to its proximity to the Tack House and Arena. Adoette is a bit far back from the road, but is very convenient to the nearby program areas. A trail leads away from Ado towards the 101 Meadow.

==== Prim ====
Prim is the primitive unit in camp. Girls sleep outside on mattresses on tarps. Prim was originally in a clearing past the Ranch House Cabins, although recently it has been in the 101 Meadow. The old Prim had a steel frame shelter with a canvas over it, a fire pit, and Porta-Biffs. The new Prim, however, does not have a shelter, but has its own biffy. Two tents are put up each session: one for the campers' gear and changing, and the other for the counselors' gear and changing. If weather is poor, campers in Prim are relocated to another unit, often Tawasi.

==== Ranch House Cabins ====
The Ranch House Cabins are very different from the other units in camp. The cabins have heating and electricity, as well as attached biffies. Each cabin typically has four bedrooms, each with six bunks. The unit is very close to Massey Hall, although a bit far from the rest of camp. Due to its higher-end accommodations, the Ranch House Cabins are usually used for younger, new campers. Many weekend camps also use the Ranch House Cabins.

==== Tawasi ====
Tawasi is the newest and smallest unit in camp. It is made up of two-sided rustic cabins with six bunks each. The shelter is enclosed, and Tawasi shares a biffy with the adjacent Adoette. A trailhead leads away from Tawasi towards the 101 meadow.

==== Wanish ====
Wanish means "Stream". It consists of two-sided rustic cabins with six bunks on each side. The shelter is enclosed, and the biffy is at the top of a small hill. Wanish is very close to Promise Lake, and is therefore usually used by waterfront units. Wanish is very close to all the program areas, as well as Adoette and Tawasi, and is therefore extremely convenient to the rest of camp.

== Program Areas ==
Program Areas refer to the various locations in camp where campers can participate in recreational activities specific to that area.

=== Arena and Tack House ===
The Arena and Tack House area is between Adoette and Wellman Road. It consists of the tack house, riding arena, and stables. All the horses at camp live here, and all the tack is stored here. Girls learn to ride in the arena before advancing to trail rides. Tack House Parties and Rodeos are also held here. Tack House Parties are an all-camp activity where girls from different units can play games or have a dance in the arena and eat desserts, and Rodeos are an all-camp activity that allows the girls in the horseback riding units an opportunity to demonstrate what they learned that session.

=== Arts and Crafts ===
Arts and Crafts is the located just across the road from the museum. Camper can participate in numerous art projects here, from candle dipping to pet-rocks. There is also a rack of lanyard string that anyone can use for lanyards and other various projects. The Arts and Crafts building has an indoor space with tables, as well as an outdoor area with picnic tables. All Camp Dinner is often served from these picnic tables. It also has a large refrigerator where extra food can be taken and stored. Arts and Crafts used to be located on the other side of the road, in a building which has not been used for many years due to safety concerns. It is now in the BOMB (Big Old Maintenance Building), which used to hold maintenance equipment downstairs and campers upstairs.

=== Honor Lake ===
The smaller of the two lakes at camp, Honor Lake is located just downhill from the pool, on the way to OCR and Archery. It is used primarily for canoeing, and campers are not allowed to swim in this lake. Due to the recent drought conditions, camp is no longer pumping extra water into the lake, and the water level has steadily been getting lower. Because of this, the lake has not been used much in recent summers. The lake was named for Honor E. Haynes, a Girl Scout volunteer who helped purchase the land for camp.

=== Pooh Corner ===
Pooh Corner is a small area in the trees behind the Dining Hall where Pooh and his friends live. Made for a younger audience, campers can have Pooh Parties, where they can read stories and eat Pooh Food (graham crackers and frosting).

=== Pool ===
The Pool area is located next to the Golf Course and the Meadow, across the road from Promise Lake. It consists of a junior-olympic sized pool, cubbies, a biffy, a picnic area, camper changing area and showers, pool house, and staff changing room and showers. Summer resident campers go swimming at the pool every day. The pool is also available for other programs, such as night swims, polar bear swims, and swamping. Certified lifeguards are always on duty when anyone is on the pool deck. The pool consists of a deep end, middle end, and shallow end. Campers must pass a basic swim test to swim in the deep or middle ends during summer resident camp.

=== Ropes Course ===
New as of Summer 2016, the Ropes Course is located just past Wanish and Promise Lake. It consists of a shaded picnic area as well as several structures related to each challenge in the course. The Ropes Course at Camp Scherman is a low-ropes course. The elements are focused mostly on teamwork rather than heights. Elements rage greatly in difficulty in order to make the course suitable for both younger and older campers. Some of the major elements include the Team Wall, Spiderwebs, and tightropes. Scherman Helmets must be worn any time a person is being lifted in any way.

== See also ==
- Scouting in California
- Girl Scouts of the USA
