= Lubomyra =

Studio album by Lubomyra Kowalchyk
- Released: 1977
- Genre: Traditional, Ukrainian folk music, folk, jazz, blues
- Language: Ukrainian
- Label: SAGE Promotions
- Producer: Luba Kowalchyk, Peter Marunzak

Lubomyra Kowalchyk chronology
Зоря (1975)	Lubomyra (1977)	Chain Reaction (1980)

Lubomyra (Cyrillic: Любомира) is the second full-length release, and first solo album by the Canadian-Ukrainian singer-songwriter Luba, then known under her full name Lubomyra. It was released around 1977 by SAGE Promotions and features eleven tracks, two of which ("Carpathia" and "Starry Eyes") were combined into one full-length song. All the songs are traditional or covers of popular Ukrainian songs, with a new arrangement, featuring elements of jazz, blues and rock. The song "Kazka" was composed by Luba herself. The album is currently out of print.

== Track listing ==
Track number	English title	Ukrainian Title	Transliteration	Lyrics	Music	Source
A1	Fairy Tale	Казка	Kazka	O. Levycky	L. Kowalchyk	-
A2	Sleep My Little One	Колискова	Koliskova	unknown	G. Gudzio	
A3	An Orchard In Bloom	Половина саду цвіте	Polovina sadu tsvite	unknown	P. Marunchak	
A4	Fortune Teller	Мені ворожка ворожила	Meni vorozhka vorozhila	Traditional	Traditional	
A5	Mama	Мама	Mama	unknown	G. Gudzio	
B1	Carpathia	А я люблю Прикарпаття	A ya lyublyu Prikarpatya	D. Tsyhankow	M. Karpenko	
B2	Starry Eyes	Запалали очі зорями	Zapalali ochi zoryami	A. Kushnirenko	M. Bakai	-
B3	Autumn Leaf	Жолтий лист	Zholtiy list	W. Hromczev	W. Iwasiuk	
B4	Whispering Wind	Вітер віє	Viter Vie	T. Shevchenko	T. Shevchenko	
B5	Pretty Lady	Дівка файна	Divka fayna	Traditional	Traditional	-
B6	A Song Of Freedom	Воля	Volya	Traditional	Traditional	-

== Personnel ==
- Lubomyra Kowalchuk - Vocals
- Gerald Gudzio - Acoustic guitar, rhythm guitar
- Peter Marunczak Jr - Percussion
- Yourko Kulycky - Keyboards
- Paul Anthony - Lead rhythm guitar
- John Jason - Bass
- Peter Humenny - Mandolin
- Steve-Geoff-Gordon - Brass
- Engineering: Gaetan Desbiens, Dave Boke, Mark Laschuk
- Photography: Irene Studios, Asbed Patakian
