= Luba (EP) =

EP by Luba
- Released: 1982
- Recorded: 1982
- Genre: Pop rock, hard rock
- Length: 15:44
- Label: Capitol-EMI of Canada

Luba chronology
Chain Reaction (1980)	Luba (1982)	Secrets and Sins (1984)

Luba is the debut EP by Canadian singer Luba, released on Capitol-EMI of Canada. Included is the hit single "Everytime I See Your Picture", a popular song in Canada at that time, which eventually jumpstarted her major singing career. The EP was available on vinyl record and cassette tape.

== Track listing ==
1. "Scarlet Letter" – 4:43
2. "Everytime I See Your Picture" – 3:52
3. "Paramour" – 3:50
4. "Raven's Eyes" – 3:19
