= On Tour (EP) =

EP by Luba
- Released: 1990
- Recorded: 1990
- Genre: Pop rock, acoustic
- Length: 22:15
- Label: Capitol-EMI of Canada

Luba chronology
All or Nothing (1989)	On Tour (1990)	From The Bitter To The Sweet (2000)

On Tour is a five song EP by Canadian singer, Luba. It was released in 1990, a year later after her album All or Nothing, featuring four tracks, recorded life during the All Or Nothing tour, and a fifth one, an acoustic version of her single "Let It Go".

== Track listing ==
1. Wild Heart (Live) – 5:00
2. Bringing It All Back Home (Live) - 4:55
3. Everytime I See Your Picture (Live) – 4:05
4. "When a Man Loves a Woman" (Live) – 4:15
5. Let It Go (Acoustic Version) – 4:00
