= Between the Earth & Sky (Luba album) =

Studio album by Luba
- Released: 1986
- Recorded: 1985
- Genres: Pop, new wave
- Length: 43:59
- Label: Capitol-EMI of Canada
- Producers: Pierre Bazinet; "Luba" (Note: The band – the quotation marks appear in the original credit on the album); Narada Michael Walden (Note: "How Many" only)

Luba chronology
Secrets and Sins (1984)	Between the Earth & Sky (1986)	Over 60 Minutes with Luba (1987)

Professional ratings
Review scores
Source	Rating
AllMusic	Link

Between the Earth & Sky is a 1986 album by Canadian singer Luba and her band, the follow-up to her breakout album Secrets and Sins. The album helped Luba win a second Juno Award for "Female Vocalist of the Year", and was also her first album to go platinum in Canada. Various musical artists appear on Between the Earth & Sky, including a saxophone solo by jazz musician Kenny G on the hit single "How Many" (produced by Narada Michael Walden). Other popular singles on the album include "Strength in Numbers", "Act of Mercy" and "Innocent (With an Explanation)".

== Track listing ==
All songs composed by Luba.

1. "Strength in Numbers" – 4:27
2. "How Many" – 4:14
3. "What You Believe" – 4:28
4. "Even in the Darkest Moments" – 3:52
5. "Back to Emotion" – 4:09
6. "Act of Mercy" – 5:29
7. "Innocent (With an Explanation)" – 3:41
8. "Take It Like a Woman" – 4:35
9. "Lay Down Your Love" – 4:23
10. "Between the Earth and Sky" – 4:41

== Personnel ==
- Luba: vocals
- Peter Marunzak: drums, drum programming and noise
- Michael (Bell) Zwonok: bass
- Mark Lyman: guitars
- Alain Couture: guitars and vocals

Additional musicians

- Daniel Barbe: keyboards and backing vocals
- Alain Simard: emulator programming
- The Sherwoods: backing vocals
- Kenny G: sax solo on "How Many"
- Sterling Crew: keyboards on "How Many"
