= Secrets and Sins =

Studio album by Luba
- Released: 1984
- Recorded: 1984
- Genre: Alternative pop, rock, new wave, pop
- Length: 39:16
- Label: Capitol-EMI of Canada
- Producer: Daniel Lanois

Luba chronology
Luba (EP) (1982)	Secrets and Sins (1984)	Between the Earth & Sky (1986)

Secrets and Sins is the first full-length album on Capitol-EMI of Canada by Canadian singer, Luba and band. Produced by Daniel Lanois, this breakout album won Luba Juno Awards for "Female Vocalist of the Year" in 1985. Included is the calypso-reggae style hit single "Let It Go", later featured on the motion picture soundtrack for 9½ Weeks. Other popular singles include "Secrets and Sins", "Storm Before the Calm" and "Everytime I See Your Picture".

== Track listing ==
1. "Secrets and Sins" – 3:43 *
2. "Everytime I See Your Picture" – 4:01 *
3. "Let It Go" – 3:45 *
4. "Sacrificial Heart" – 3:30
5. "Still the Voices" - 4:37
6. "Young Guns" - 3:29
7. "One with You" - 5:10
8. "Private Wars" - 3:15
9. "Storm Before the Calm" - 3:21 *
10. "Resurrect the Love" - 4:25

* Different releases contain different mixes of these songs.

== Personnel ==
- Luba – lead and backing vocals
- Peter Marunzak – drums, percussion
- Michael (Bell) Zwonok – bass, backing vocals
- Mark Lyman – guitars, backing vocals
- Pierre Marchand – keyboards, backing vocals
- Dick Smith, Daniel Lanois – additional percussion
- Shawne Jackson, Sharon Lee Williams – additional backing vocals
