= Los Angeles Area Council =

Council of the Boy Scouts of America

Greater Los Angeles Area Council (#033)
- Owner: Boy Scouts of America
- Country: United States
- Founded: 1915
- Defunct: July 2015
- Website glaacbsa.org

Founded in 1915, the Greater Los Angeles Area Council (GLAAC) (#033) served most of the City of Los Angeles as well as several other cities in the greater Los Angeles area. It was one of five Boy Scouts of America councils in Los Angeles County, California. Since its founding in 1915, the Los Angeles Area Council has brought its purpose and values to millions of youth. The Council served 54,567 youth in the Greater Los Angeles Area in 2008 alone.

Greater Los Angeles Area Council (GLAAC) is a new Boy Scouts of America Council made from the merger of the Los Angeles Area Council and the San Gabriel Valley Council. The vote to merge was held on March 21, 2015. The new name for the Council, Greater Los Angeles Area Council, was announced on June 11, 2015. The new Council will continue with Scouting Service centers in Los Angeles and Pasadena. GLAAC has three Scout shops in Los Angeles, San Pedro and Pasadena. GLAAC operates eight BSA Camps in the greater Los Angeles area. Due to the large size of the two original councils, the merger is a process that will be completed over a time span.

== History ==
The Los Angeles Area Council was founded in 1915 as the Centinela Council, changing its name in 1925 to the Los Angeles Council. In 1934 the San Antonio District (#046), founded in 1922; and the South Pasadena Council (#067), founded in 1927 merged into the LAC, with the name of the organization changing to the Los Angeles Metropolitan Area Council. The council name changed to LAAC in 1945. The LAAC was one of the first councils organized in the United States and is one of the largest councils still in existence.

Cubmaster Don Murphy organized the first pinewood derby, which was raced on May 15, 1953 in Manhattan Beach, California, by Pack 280C.

== Organization ==
The following are the former districts and the communities they served:

- Frontier District - served the communities of Maywood, South Gate, Artesia, Bellflower, Cerritos, Compton, Downey, Hawaiian Gardens, La Mirada, Lynwood, Norwalk and Paramount
- North Star District - served the Los Angeles communities of downtown Los Angeles, Angelino Heights, Atwater Village, Chavez Ravine, Chinatown, Echo Park, Filipinotown, Griffith Park, Hancock Park, Harvard Heights, Highland Park, Hollywood, Koreatown, Little Tokyo, Los Feliz, Larchmont Village, Mount Washington, Silver Lake, South Park, Thai Town, Toy District, Virgil Village; and South Pasadena.
- Pacifica District - served the communities of Carson, El Segundo, Gardena, Harbor City, Hermosa Beach, Lomita, Manhattan Beach, Palos Verdes Estates, Rancho Palos Verdes, Redondo Beach, Rolling Hills Estates, San Pedro, Torrance and Wilmington
- Pioneer District (existed in 1958) - served the communities of [unknown]
- Rio Hondo District - served the communities of Montebello, Pico Rivera, Santa Fe Springs and Whittier
- Thunderbird District - served the Los Angeles neighborhoods of Firestone Park, Baldwin Hills, Central and King, Boyle Heights and Wagner; the South Los Angeles neighborhoods of Watts, Leimert Park (near Koreatown), August F. Haw, Westchester, Exposition Park, Crenshaw District, Windsor Hills) and the communities of Lawndale, Hawthorne and Inglewood

== Camps ==
- Cabrillo Beach Youth Waterfront Sports Center 33.7150°N 118.2841°W

In 1946, the LAAC leased the Cabrillo Camp property. It is located at the base of the cliffs directly below Fort MacArthur. The camp was open to both Scouts and other youth groups. The camp utilized the old military Quonset huts and portable trailers.

In the late 70s, the Port of Los Angeles granted the Scouts a long-term lease.

With money donated by Steven Spielberg in 1987, the Spielberg Center opened a swimming pool, campgrounds, dining area, craft center, Scout Shop, staff quarters, boat house and amphitheater. The facility is 12.3 acres (0.019 sq mi; 0.050 km^{2}) and the building is 25,000 square feet (2,300 m^{2}) of Spanish and Mediterranean architecture.

- Firestone Scout Reservation, (elev. 500 ft) 33.9423°N 117.8474°W is a semi-primitive camp located just east of State Route 57 in Tonner Canyon between Diamond Bar and Brea, California. The facilities are available to most non-profit youth groups in addition to Scouting organizations.
- Hubert Eaton Scout Reservation (elev. 5,300 ft) 34.2511°N 117.1270°W (renamed from Forest Lawn Scout Reservation in 2017 and originally known as the Lake Arrowhead Boy Scout Camps) HESR is a group of Boy Scout and Cub Scout Resident Summer Camps located 3 miles (5 km) east of Lake Arrowhead, California on more than 2,000 acres (8 km^{2}) in the San Bernardino National Forest.
  - Circle X Ranch at Big Horn is a Boy Scout Resident Summer Camp, opened in 1950 as Camp Big Horn.
  - Camp Pepperdine was a Cub Scout Resident Summer Camp for the 2007 and 2008 seasons; it was formerly a primitive camping facility that opened in 1960.
  - Camp Pitchess, (Now Closed) formerly Camp Cedar, opened in 1953 as a Cub Scout Resident Summer Camp; it burned in the Waterman Canyon Wildfire, October 2003.
  - Camp Pollock — adjacent to what was once Camp Pitchess, is a year-round training center with an indoor climbing wall and cabins. It opened for the 2009 season as the Cub Scout Resident Summer Camp.
  - John Wayne Outpost is a wilderness camping area that opened in 1979.
  - Northrop Family Camp opened in 1955 is now a staff housing area and used for select program activities.
- Log Cabin Wilderness Camp (elev. 9,640 ft) is a high adventure base camp located in the Inyo National Forest. The camp is near the Tioga Pass Road on the eastern slopes of the Sierra Nevada bordering the Hoover Wilderness and Yosemite National Park.
- Camp Circle X - Closed located in the Triunfo Pass (now part of the Santa Monica Mountains NRA, (operated by the NPS))

=== Log Cabin Wilderness Camp ===
Log Cabin Wilderness Camp
- Owner: Los Angeles Area Council
- Coordinates: 37.9767°N 119.174°W
- Website http://www.logcabincamp.org

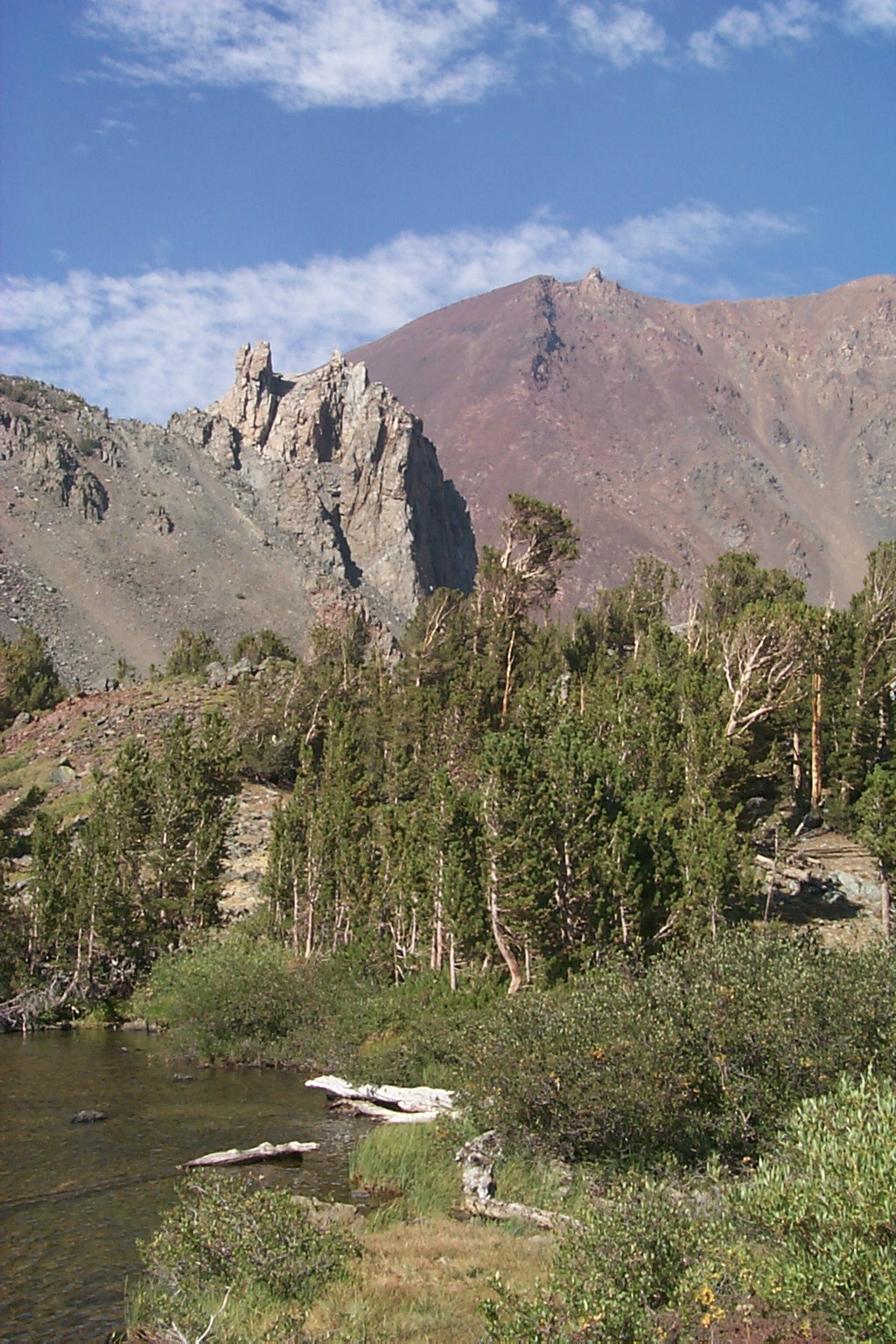
Dunderberg Peak

Log Cabin Wilderness Camp is a Boy Scout camp operated by the Los Angeles Area Council and is located in the Inyo National Forest.

"Log Cabin" is a high adventure camp. The camp is near the Tioga Pass Road on the eastern slopes of the Sierra Nevada bordering the Hoover Wilderness and Yosemite National Park. It is the highest Boy Scout camp in the country, at approximately 9,800 feet (3,000 m) above sea level. It was originally the site of the Log Cabin Gold Mine, which operated in the early 20th century. The mine was donated to Council in 1971. Programs offered at Log Cabin include High Country Gateway backpacking, Sierra Nevada Mountain Man, Peak Bagging, ranger training and COPE

== National Youth Leader Training ==
The council offers National Youth Leadership Training. Formerly known as Brownsea 22 Junior Leader Training, NYLT is an intense six-day outdoor experience for Boy Scout Troop youth leaders ages 13–17.. The Los Angeles Area Council holds an NYLT encampment each August on the Forest Lawn Scout Reservation.

== Order of the Arrow ==
The Order of the Arrow (OA) is the national honor society of the Boy Scouts of America. The OA provides leadership and service experience to OA Scouts.

Siwinis Lodge was the local lodge of the Order of the Arrow. Siwinis Lodge was founded in December 1943 a BSA charter was granted in April 1944 as Lodge #252. The name Siwinis, means "Big Pine". The name came from a summer camp song.

On March 16, 2016 the Ta Tanka OA Lodge of the San Gabriel Valley Council and the Siwinis OA Lodge of the Los Angeles Area Council voted and agreed on a new Lodge name and totem for the new Lodge of the Greater Los Angeles Area Council. The new Lodge is Tuku'ut and the totem is the Saber-Toothed Cat.

== See also ==
- Scouting in California
