= Scouting in California =

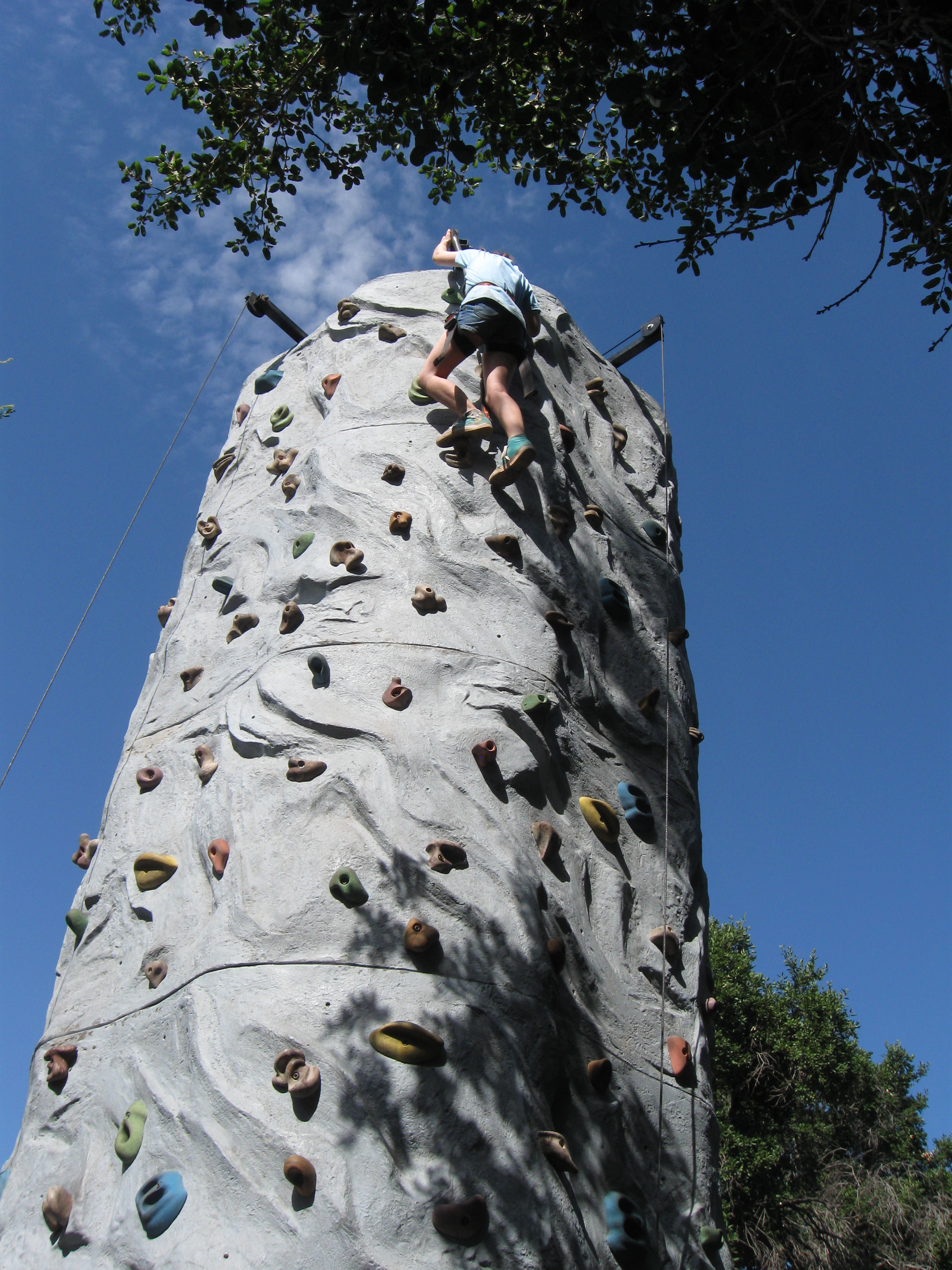
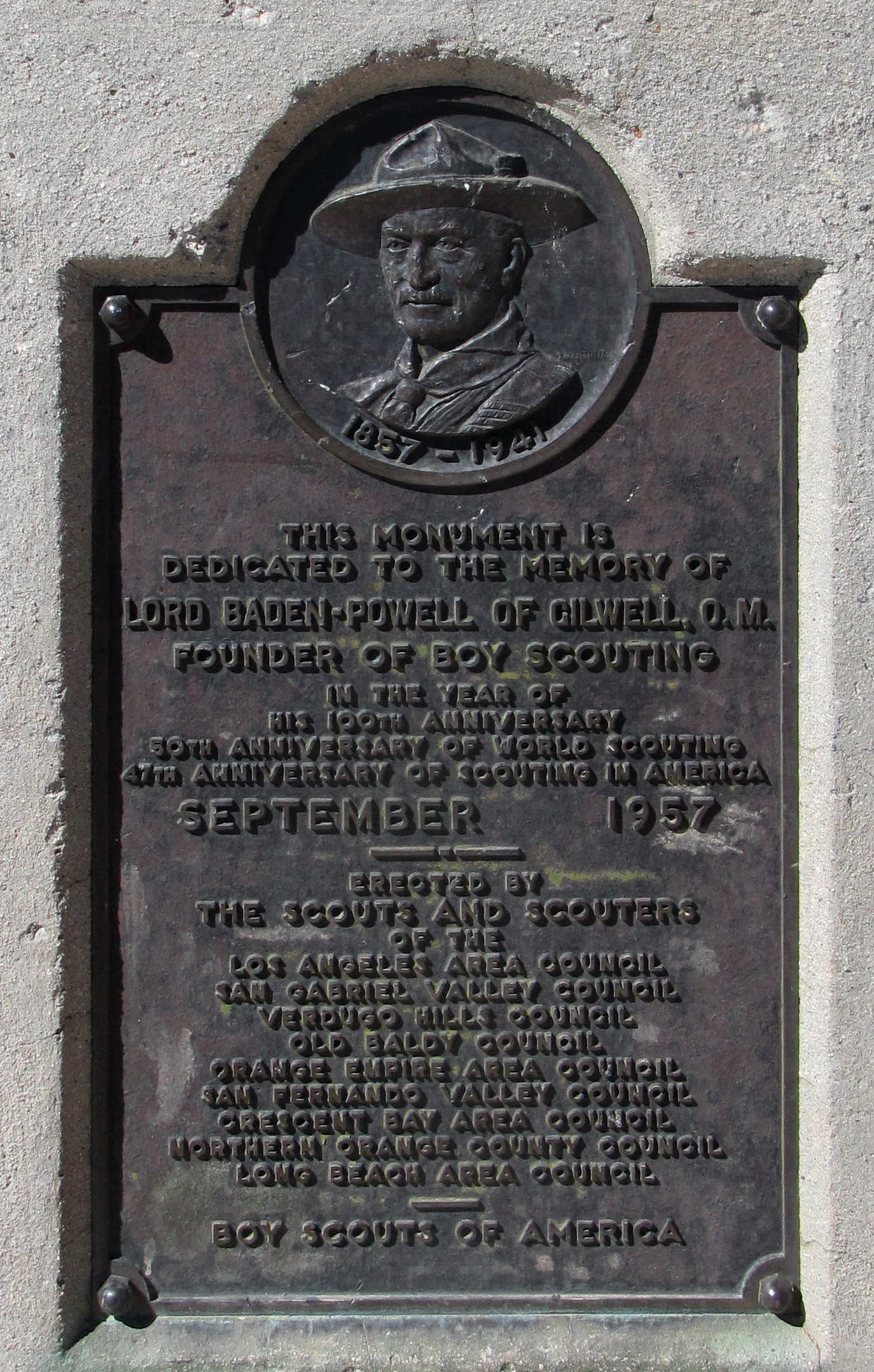
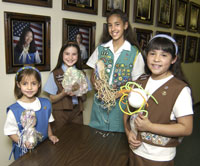
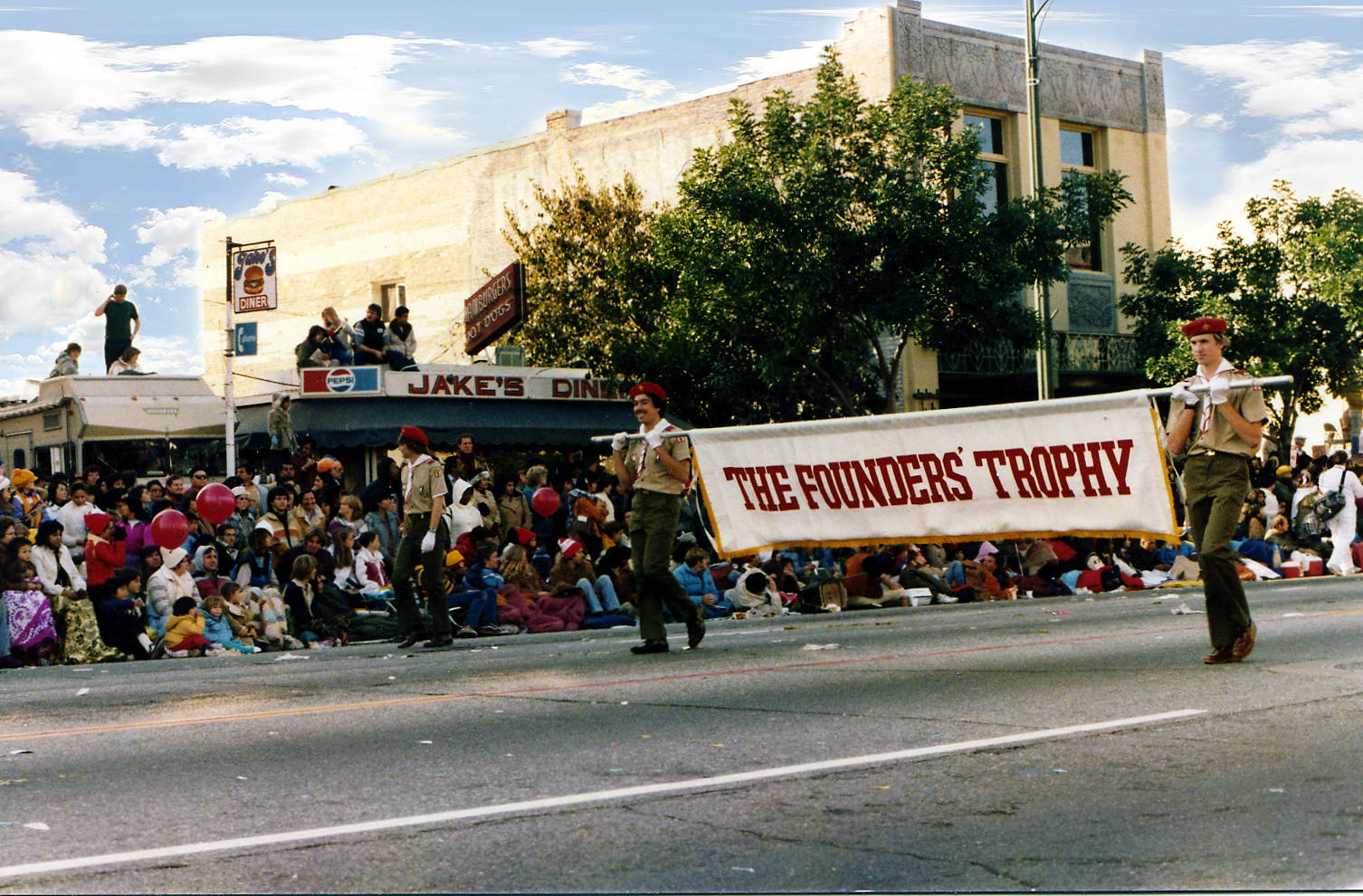
- Corriganville Regional Park Baden Powell Memorial Girl Scouts at JPL Scouts at the Tournament of Roses Parade

Scouting in California has a long history, from the 1910s to the present day, serving thousands of youth in programs related to their environments.

== Early history (1910–1950) ==
In the early days of ″Scouting″ there were several different ″Scouting″ type organizations. Some of the organizations known to have members in California were:

- American Boy Scout (also known as the United States Boy Scout organization)
- Boy Scouts of America (BSA)
- Girl Scouts of the USA
- California Boy Scouts
- Peace Scouts of California

The Boy Scouts of United States (a wing of the National Highway Protective Association), Young Men's Christian Association and the Salvation Army may have also had ″Scouting″ type programs in California.

In 1914, parents and Chinese-American boys organized their own Boy Scout troop in San Francisco, the first troop for Chinese Americans and possibly the first troop in San Francisco. It was recognized as Troop 3 once San Francisco became a council. The troop continues today.

Girl Scouting officially started in California by 1917 when Lou Henry Hoover helped form a troop in Palo Alto. In 1922 the first service unit in the western United States, Service Unit 1, was set up in Palo Alto by Lou Henry Hoover, then president of the Girl Scouts of the US, and is now part of the Girl Scouts of Northern California council.

== Recent history (1950–1990) ==
The 1953 National Scout Jamboree was held at Irvine Ranch, California. Jamboree Road in Newport Beach, California was named to commemorate the site of the 1953 event.

The 1973 National Order of the Arrow Conference was held at the University of California, Santa Barbara.

== Boy Scouting in California today ==
There are twenty-four Boy Scouts of America local councils in California.

=== California Inland Empire Council ===
California Inland Empire Council (#045)
- Owner: Scouting America
- Headquarters: Redlands, California
- Country: United States
- Founded: 1916
- President: Scott "Mac" McLeod
- Council Commissioner: Matt Flanagan
- Scout Executive: Joseph Daniszewski
- Website bsa-ciec.org

The California Inland Empire Council (CIEC) was formed in 1973 through the merger of the Arrowhead Area (#048) and Riverside Area Councils (#045). In 1974 Grayback Council (#024) also merged into the new council. In 2006, the council acquired the San Bernardino County portions of Old Baldy Council (#043). The council territory includes all of Riverside and San Bernardino Counties.

=== Crater Lake Council ===
Crater Lake Council serves Scouts in Oregon and California.

=== Golden Empire Council ===
Golden Empire Council (#047)
- Owner: Scouting America
- Headquarters: Sacramento, California
- Country: United States
- Founded: 1917
- Website gec-bsa.org

The Golden Empire Council (#047), first chartered in 1920, serves Scouts in a large section of Northern California, primarily the Sacramento Valley and the northern Sierra Nevada mountains. The council headquarters are located in Sacramento. The council covers 16 counties in Northern California: Amador, Butte, Colusa, El Dorado, Glenn, Nevada, Placer, Sacramento, Solano, Shasta, Sierra, Sutter, Tehama, Trinity, Yolo, and Yuba counties.

=== Golden Gate Area Council ===
San Francisco Bay Area Council #028
- Owner: Scouting America
- Headquarters: San Leandro, California
- Country: United States
- Website sfbac.org

The SFBAC (#028) was formed by a merger of the San Francisco Area Council and Oakland Area Council in February 1964. Located in the San Francisco Bay Area, serving the cities of Colma, Daly City (northern section), San Francisco, Emeryville, Oakland, San Leandro, Hayward, Fremont, Union City, Newark, Pleasanton, Dublin, and Livermore, as well as unincorporated communities such as Castro Valley, San Lorenzo, and Sunol. In June 1916, the Oakland-Piedmont Council (#021) was chartered, changing its name in 1921 to the Oakland Area Council after Piedmont elected to organize their own council. In January 1917, the San Francisco Council (#051) was chartered, changing its name in 1924 to the San Francisco Area Council.^{[a]}

=== Greater Los Angeles Area Council ===
Greater Los Angeles Area Council (#33)
- Owner: Scouting America
- Headquarters: Los Angeles and Pasadena
- Country: United States
- Founded: 2015
- Membership: Los Angeles Area Council and San Gabriel Valley Council
- Website www.glaacbsa.org

The Greater Los Angeles Area Council (GLAAC) is the council made from the merger of the Los Angeles Area Council and the San Gabriel Valley Council. The vote to merge was held on March 21, 2015. The new name Council, Greater Los Angeles Area Council, was announced on June 11, 2015. The new Council will continue with Scouting Service centers in Los Angeles and Pasadena. GLAAC has three Scout shops in Los Angeles, San Pedro and Pasadena. GLAAC operates eight BSA Camps in the greater Los Angeles area. Due to the large size of the two original councils, the merger is a process that will be completed over a time span.

=== Greater Yosemite Council ===
Greater Yosemite Council (#059)
- Owner: Scouting America
- Headquarters: Modesto, California
- Country: United States
- Founded: 1917
- Website yosemitescouting.org

The Greater Yosemite Council (#059) is a local council of the Boy Scouts of America based in Modesto, California. It was founded in 1920 as the Modesto Council. In 1921 Modesto changed its name to the Stanislaus County Council, and in 1922 to the Yosemite Area Council. In 1998, the council changed its name to the Greater Yosemite Council. In 1997, the Forty Niner Council (#052) merged with the Yosemite Area Council.

The Forty Niner Council was founded in 1918 as the Stockton Council. In 1922 Stockton changed its name to San Joaquin, and in 1929 to San Joaquin-Calaveras Council. In 1957, San Joaquin-Calaveras Council changed its name to Forty Niner Council.^{[a]}

==== Organization ====
The council reorganized eight districts into three in 2011. The 49er District. Calaveras District, and the Big Valley District were combined into the Gold Country District. The Chief Tenaya District and the Golden Heritage District, and Waukeen District formed the Sierra Valley District. The El Capitan District and the Wawona District became the Rio Del Oro District.

==== Camps ====
- Camp John Mensinger
- Camp McConnell

==== Order of the Arrow ====
- Toloma Lodge #64

=== Las Vegas Area Council ===
Formerly Boulder Dam Area Council, Las Vegas Area Council serves Scouts in Nevada, California and Arizona.

=== Long Beach Area Council ===
Long Beach Area Council (#032)
- Owner: Scouting America
- Headquarters: Long Beach, California
- Country: United States
- Founded: 1919
- Scout Executive: John Fullerton
- Website longbeachbsa.org

The Long Beach Area Council (LBAC), headquartered in Long Beach and founded in 1919, is one of five Boy Scouts of America councils in Los Angeles County, California.^{[a]}

=== Los Padres Council ===
Los Padres Council (#053)
- Owner: Scouting America
- Headquarters: Santa Barbara, California
- Country: United States
- Founded: 1915
- Website lpcbsa.org

The Los Padres Council was founded in 1917 as the Santa Barbara Council. The Santa Barbara Council changed its name in 1929 to the Mission Council and stayed that way until 1994. In 1994, the Santa Lucia Area Council merged with the Mission Council to form the Los Padres Council. The Santa Lucia Area Council (#056) was founded in 1933, as the San Luis Obispo County Council. The Central Coast Counties council (#025), founded in 1922 merged into Santa Barbara in 1924.^{[a]}

=== Marin Council ===
Marin Council (#035)
- Owner: Scouting America
- Headquarters: San Rafael, California
- Country: United States
- Founded: 1919
- President: Chris Cardinal
- Council Commissioner: Sam Guyton
- Scout Executive: Michael Dybeck
- Website www.boyscouts-marin.org

One of the four councils that serves the San Francisco Bay area, the Marin Council was formed in 1910. In 1918 it absorbed the Mill Valley and Sausalito Councils.^{[a]} The Marin County's Scouting community was born just six months after the national Boy Scouts of America organization in 1910.

==== Camps ====
- Camp Marin-Sierra (Chubb Lake) located in Emigrant Gap, CA. The camp features 320-acres of forested terrain with significant facilities, including Ibach And Murray lodges, a rifle, shotgun and archery range, full commercial kitchen, rock climbing wall, camp fire bowl and waterfront facilities. Marin Sierra hosts resident camp for Scouts BSA troops and Venture crews. The facility is also used year-round by various Scout units and is staffed by a full-time ranger.
- Camp Tamarancho located in Fairfax, CA. 412 acre camp available for year-round use, the camp has developed facilities including a full commercial kitchen, archery and rifle ranges, a chapel and both developed and primitive campsites. Tamarancho hosts BSA units from around Northern California as well as Marin Council programs such as Cub Scout day camp. The camp is staffed by a full time ranger. Surrounding the camp is one of the Bay Area’s largest network of maintained single-track mountain bike trails.
- Media related to Camp Tamarancho at Wikimedia Commons

==== Order of the Arrow ====
- Talako Lodge #533

=== Nevada Area Council ===
Nevada Area Council serves approximately 14,000 youth through chartered organizations and BSA units in northern Nevada and northeastern California. The parts of California served by the NAC are Alpine County, Lassen County, Plumas County, the northern portion of Mono County, and the eastern portions of El Dorado County, Placer County, and Sierra County.

=== Orange County Council ===
Orange County Council (#039)
- Owner: Scouting America
- Headquarters: Orange, California
- Country: United States
- Founded: 1921
- Website ocbsa.org

Founded in 1920 as the Orange County Council, the council was formed by the merger of the North Orange Council (#037) and the Orange Empire Council (#039) in 1972. The North Orange Council was founded in 1944 as the Northern Orange County and changed its name to North Orange in 1965.^{[a]}

Orange County Council is one of the 20 largest councils by traditional membership in the nation. In 2008 it had over 40,000 youth members.

=== Pacific Skyline Council ===
Pacific Skyline Council (#031)
- Owner: Scouting America
- Headquarters: Foster City, California
- Country: United States
- Founded: 1932
- Website pacsky.org

One of the six councils that serves the San Francisco Bay area, the Pacific Skyline Council was founded in 1940 as the Stanford Area Council (#031).^{[a]} In 1994, the Stanford Area Council merged with the San Mateo County Council (#020) to form the current council.

=== Piedmont Council ===
Piedmont Council (#042)
- Owner: Scouting America
- Headquarters: Piedmont, California
- Country: United States
- Founded: 1921
- Website piedmontbsa.org

The Piedmont Council (California) of BSA serves chartered organizations and BSA units located in the city of Piedmont, located in the East Bay hills and surrounded by the city of Oakland. The council was first chartered in 1921, and by some measurements is the smallest in the BSA, but has a high level of activity and serves a high percentage of the available youth living in Piedmont.^{[a]} Piedmont Council is one of the six councils that serves the San Francisco Bay Area.

=== Redwood Empire Council ===
Redwood Empire Council #041
- Owner: Scouting America
- Headquarters: Santa Rosa, California
- Country: United States
- Founded: 1919
- Website redwoodbsa.org

Redwood Empire Council is the local council of the Boy Scouts of America that serves youth in Mendocino and Sonoma counties in California.

The Petaluma Council (#041) was founded in 1919, later named the Petaluma Area Council. This council renamed itself the Sonoma-Mendocino Area Council when the Scouting districts of northern Sonoma County and Mendocino County were separated from Silverado Area Council in 1942. In 1992, the Sonoma-Mendocino Council merged with the Redwood Area Council (#044), to form the Redwood Empire Council. The Redwood Area Council was founded in 1923.^{[a]}

=== San Diego-Imperial Council ===
San Diego-Imperial Council #049
- Owner: Scouting America
- Headquarters: San Diego, California
- Country: United States
- Founded: 1916
- Website sdicbsa.org

The San Diego-Imperial Council is headquartered in San Diego, California, and serves youth members and volunteer leaders through Scout units in San Diego and Imperial counties of Southern California, as well as a portion of Arizona. Founded in 1916 as the Coronado Council, and the San Diego Council, in 1917 the two council merged to make the San Diego County Council (#049). Founded in 1922, the Imperial County Council (#029) changed its name to Imperial-Yuma Area Council in 1929, and changed the name again in 1959 to Desert Trails Council. In 1993 Desert Trails and San Diego County merged to become Desert Pacific Council. Desert Pacific Council was renamed to San Diego-Imperial Council on January 3, 2005.^{[a]}

=== Silicon Valley Monterey Bay Council ===
Silicon Valley Monterey Bay Council
- Owner: Scouting America
- Headquarters: San Jose, California
- Location: Santa Clara County, Santa Cruz County, San Benito County, Monterey County
- Country: United States
- Founded: August 20, 1920
- Founders: John Crummey, Robert Bentley, Jr., Archer Bowden
- Scout Executive: Jason Stein
- Website svmbc.org

Silicon Valley Monterey Bay Council (#055), the result of a council merger between the Santa Clara County Council and the Monterey Bay Area Council, is a Boy Scouts of America council headquartered in San Jose, California. As of 2022, the council serves over 9,200 youth in Boy Scout troops, Cub Scout packs, Venturing crews, and Explorer posts.

=== Sequoia Council ===
(not to be confused with the Sequoyah Council located in Tennessee and Virginia)

Sequoia Council #027
- Owner: Scouting America
- Headquarters: Fresno, California
- Country: United States
- Founded: 1919
- President: Richard Schneider
- Council Commissioner: Mark Millett
- Scout Executive: Currently Vacant
- Website seqbsa.org

The Sequoia Council serves Fresno, Madera, Kings and Tulare Counties in California. Founded in 1919 as the Fresno Council, it changed its name to Sequoia Council in 1925. In 1992, the Mount Whitney Area Council (#054) merged into Sequoia.^{[a]}

=== Southern Sierra Council ===
Southern Sierra Council #030
- Owner: Scouting America
- Headquarters: Bakersfield, California
- Country: United States
- Founded: 1919
- Website sscbsa.org

The Southern Sierra Council serves Kern, Inyo, and Mono counties in California. Founded in 1919 as the Bakersfield Council, it changed its name to the Kern County Council in 1921, and then to the Southern Sierra Council in 1965.^{[a]}

=== Ventura County Council ===
Ventura County Council #057
- Owner: Scouting America
- Headquarters: Camarillo, California
- Country: United States
- Founded: 1921
- Website vccbsa.org

Ventura County Council of the Boy Scouts of America was officially chartered as Council 57 on June 23, 1921, after a series of meetings that followed a proposal put forward at a County Chamber of Commerce meeting on March 28, 1921 in the Masonic Hall. Mr. C. H. Whipple, then of Moorpark and later Oxnard, became the president; and Col. J.L. Howland became commissioner. Harvey R. Cheesman, an assistant Scout executive in the Los Angeles Council, became the first Scout Executive, assuming his duties on July 11.^{[a]}

=== Verdugo Hills Council ===
Verdugo Hills Council #058
- Owner: Scouting America
- Headquarters: Glendale, California
- Country: United States
- Founded: 1920
- Website vhcbsa.org

Verdugo Hills Council (VHC) is one of five Boy Scouts of America councils in Los Angeles County, California. Headquartered in Glendale. It was founded in 1920 as the Glendale Council, changing its name in 1922 to the Verdugo Hills Council (#058).^{[a]}

=== Western Los Angeles County Council ===
Western Los Angeles County Council (#051)
- Owner: Scouting America
- Headquarters: Van Nuys, California
- Country: United States
- Founded: 1917
- Website bsa-la.org

The Western Los Angeles County Council (WLACC) (#051) is one of five Boy Scouts of America councils in Los Angeles County, California. Headquartered in Van Nuys, the council services over 30,000 youth spanning six districts including the San Fernando Valley, Santa Clarita Valley, Antelope Valley, Malibu, and much of West Los Angeles.

The Western Los Angeles County Council was formed in 1972 with the merger of the Crescent Bay Council (#026) and the San Fernando Valley Council (#050) to form the Great Western Council. The Great Western Council was renamed Western Los Angeles County Council in 1985.^{[a]}

== Girl Scouting in California ==
Girl Scouting in California
- Map of Girl Scout Councils in California

There are 13 Girl Scout councils serving California of which 8 have headquarters there.

=== Girl Scouts Arizona Cactus-Pine Council ===
In California, serves a small portion of far eastern San Bernardino County in the south-east of the state.

Headquarters: Phoenix, Arizona Website: www.girlscoutsaz.org

=== Girl Scouts of California's Central Coast ===
Girl Scouts of California's Central Coast
- Owner: GSUSA
- Headquarters: Camarillo, California
- Country: United States
- Chief Executive Officer: Gina M. Jaeger
- Board Chair: Tammie Helmuth
- Chief Operating Officer: Karen Skole
- Website girlscoutsccc.org

This council was formed by the merger of Monterey and Tres Condados councils on October 1, 2007. It serves approximately 10,000 girls in Ventura, Santa Barbara, San Luis Obispo, San Benito, Monterey and Santa Cruz counties.

Camps:

- Arnaz Program Center was dedicated in 1982 and is located on 36 acres near Ojai Valley
- Alisal Program Center features an after school program and is located in the Salinas, California area

=== Girl Scouts of Central California South ===
Girl Scouts of Central California South
- Owner: GSUSA
- Headquarters: Fresno, California
- Country: United States
- Chief Executive Officer: Dr. Russel Statham
- Board Chair: Keith Pretzer
- Website girlscoutsccs.org

Girl Scouts of Central California South was formerly Girl Scouts Golden Valley Council before expansion and renaming in October 2008. It serves about 11,000 girls in Fresno, Kern, Kings, Madera and Tulare Counties.

=== Girl Scouts of Greater Los Angeles ===
Girl Scouts of Greater Los Angeles
- Owner: GSUSA
- Headquarters: Los Angeles, California
- Country: United States
- Website girlscoutsla.org

The new council, "Girl Scouts of Greater Los Angeles", is a merger on December 1, 2008 of Angeles Girl Scout Council, Girl Scout Council of Greater Long Beach, Joshua Tree Council (southeastern portion), Mt. Wilson Vista Council, Spanish Trails Council, and San Fernando Valley Girl Scout Council. It serves nearly 45,000 girls and has over 22,000 volunteers.

==== Camps ====
- Camp Mariposa in Altadana
- Montrose Program Center in Montrose
- San Gabriel Program Center in San Gabriel, CA
- El Potrero de la Cienega is 390 acres (160 ha) in Cleveland National Forest
- Twin Valleys is 25 acres (10 ha) near Wrightwood
- La Casita Program Center near Claremont
- Johnstone Program Center
- Covina Program Center
- Chino Program Center
- Camp Lakota is nearly 60 acres (24 ha) in Los Padres National Forest
- Camp Osito Rancho is 160 acres (65 ha) in Big Bear Lake in the San Bernardino Mountain Range

=== Girl Scouts Heart of Central California ===
Girl Scouts Heart of Central California
- Owner: GSUSA
- Headquarters: Sacramento, California
- Country: United States
- Chief Executive Officer: Linda Farley
- Board Chair: Robin Kren
- Website girlscoutshcc.org

Girl Scouts Heart of Central California (GSHCC) serves nearly 27,000 girls and 10,000 volunteers in 18 counties (Alpine, Amador, Calaveras, Colusa, El Dorado, Glenn, Mariposa, Merced, Nevada, Placer, Sacramento, San Joaquin, Solano, Stanislaus, Sutter, Tuolumne, Yolo, and Yuba). GSHCC was formed on June 1, 2007, by the merger of the old Muir Trail and Tierra del Oro councils. The main headquarters is in Sacramento with an additional office in Modesto. Both offices feature large meeting spaces for troops and community members, as well as interactive STEM centers that host weekly activities. Given the natural surrounding environment in the Northern Central Valley, this council has a large and historical presence in outdoor activities such as camping, stewardship, and backpacking.

Residential camps:

- Camp Menzies has 175 acres (71 ha) near Arnold in the Sierra Nevada mountains. The land was donated to the Girl Scouts in the 1940s by Charles Menzies, a Stockton businessman, who purchased the land in 1907 from a Miwok tribe.
  - The camp features a wide variety of class summer camp activities, such as archery, horseback riding, overnight expeditions, swimming, canoeing, arts & crafts, and outdoor skill building. The camp is rustic, hilly, and features open-air mesh wall cabins for the campers.
- Camp Golden Timbers is a volunteer-run, week-long summer camp located in Pinecrest, Tuolumne County, California.
- Camp Fleming is located on 440 acres (180 ha) outside of Placerville, California and is used for events such as volunteer run 'camporees', trainings (such as First Aid or backpacking skills), an annual Fall Festival, and various leadership opportunities for Girl Scouts and volunteers. It is ADA accessible.

=== Girl Scouts of Northern California ===
Girl Scouts of Northern California
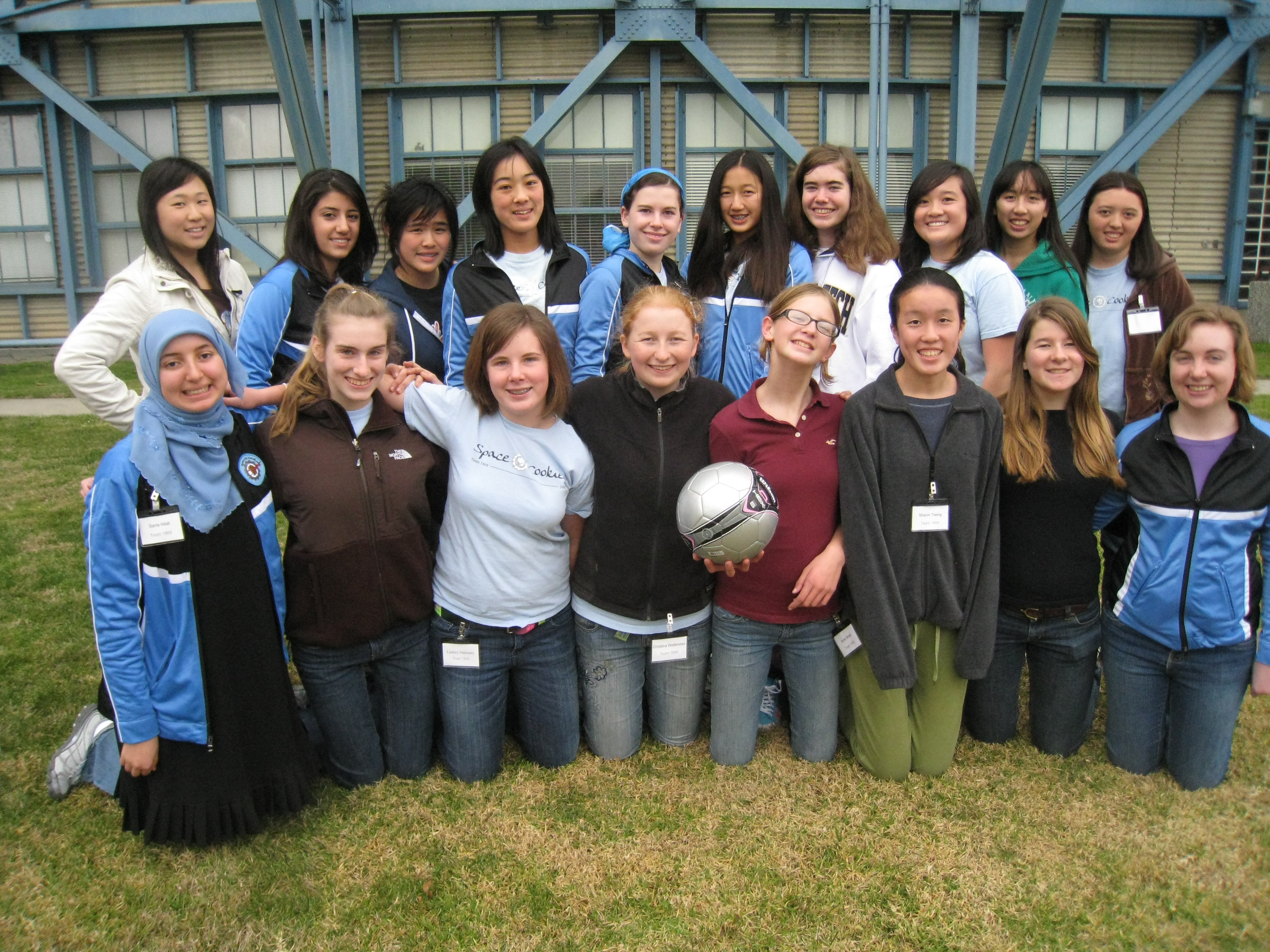
- The Space Cookies are getting ready for their tenth season of FIRST Robotics.
- Owner: GSUSA
- Headquarters: Alameda, California and San Jose, California
- Country: United States
- Chief Executive Officer: Mary-Jane Strom
- Board Chair: Diana Bell
- Website www.girlscoutsnorcal.org

A new council formed by the merger of Konocti, San Francisco Bay Area, Santa Clara County, Sierra Cascade, and Napa-Solano councils on October 1, 2007. It serves over 50,000 girls in 19 counties (Alameda, Butte, Contra Costa, Del Norte, Glenn, Humboldt, Lake, Marin, Mendocino, Napa, Santa Clara, San Francisco, San Mateo, Shasta, Siskiyou, Solano, Sonoma, Tehama, and Trinity).

Known for it annual "Golden Gate Bridging" where Junior Girl Scouts bridging to Cadette Girl Scouts walk across the Golden Gate Bridge. This event was started in 1981 with one troop, but now has several thousand scouts involved each year, many of them from outside of the council. The council has also joined with NASA Ames to have several Girl Scout robotics teams nicknamed Space Cookies; including the 80 or so strong troop/team that competes in the FIRST competition and another troop with multiple teams that participates in the VEX competitions.

==== Camps ====
- Camp Bothin is in a canyon in Marin county north of San Francisco.
- Camp Butano Creek is 145 acres (59 ha) located in old growth redwoods in San Mateo County next to Butano State Park
- The Cove is a wilderness camp near Napa, California
- Camp Deer Lake is a high adventure camp located at 6,800 ft (2,100 m) in Tahoe National Forest (Closed)
- Camp Sugar Pine is located in Calaveras County, California in the Sierra Nevada foothills
- Twin Canyon is 35 acres (14 ha) in the East Bay hills near to Briones Regional Park
- Camp Two Sentinels, located at 8,000 ft (2,400 m) on Lake Kirkwood in Eldorado National Forest Two Sentinels Girl Scout Camp - Home
- Skylark Ranch 280 acres (110 ha) on the Pacific coast north of Santa Cruz and near to Año Nuevo State Reserve.
- Hidden Falls has 90 acres (36 ha) in the redwood forests of the Santa Cruz Mountains.

===== Camp Bothin =====
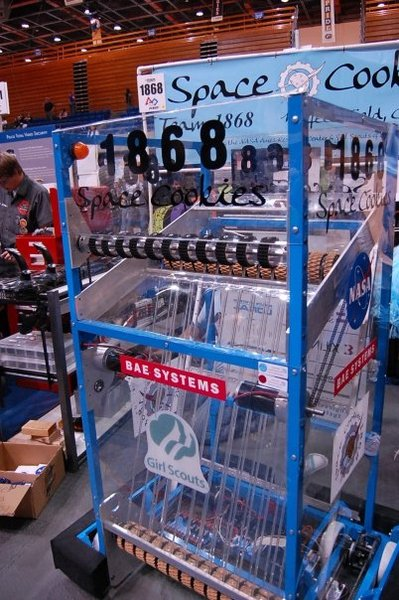
The Space Cookies' 2011 robot "Mazarine" placed first in the Sacramento FIRST Regional, and the team received the Engineering Inspiration Award.

Camp Bothin officially known as the Bothin Youth Center, is a Girl Scout summer camp. Since 1948 it has been located in Marin County, California. The site is managed by Girl Scouts of Northern California and supported mostly through private foundation grants and individual donations.

===== Convalescent home =====
In 1905 Camp Bothin was established as "Hill Farm", a convalescent home for women and children, near Fairfax, California, on property then owned by Henry E. Bothin. Before antibiotics, medicine had few treatments other than rest and good food for many illnesses, especially tuberculosis (TB). The patients were initially housed in an old farmhouse. Normally, Hill Farm was home to 30 patients, but during the summer the mild climate allowed as many as 60, who were housed in tents and slept on cots. During this time, Miss Elizabeth H. Ashe was director.

In 1910, the officers formed the corporation named Bothin Convalescent Home for Women and Children. Mr. Bothin deeded 152 acres (62 ha) of land to this corporation. The old farm house was torn down and a rustic building, now known as Manor House, was erected that could accommodate 40 patients. It had deep sleeping porches (fresh air was considered important for TB patients) and an outdoor dining room.

That same year the Arequipa Sanatorium, directed by Dr. Philip King Brown, was opened to serve women in the first stages of TB. At the time, the only known treatment was rest and good nutrition, in the hopes that the lungs could recover and heal. The name Arequipa, taken from a city in Peru, was said to be a Native American word signifying 'place of rest.' Following the 1906 San Francisco earthquake, dust- and ash-filled air had contributed to a tuberculosis epidemic in San Francisco.

With the help of local artists and members of the area's philanthropic community, Dr. Brown introduced therapeutic handcrafts to the women, to combat idleness and avoid the stigma of charity. The hospital hired potter Frederick Hurten Rhead to teach patients and develop a pottery studio. Work from the Arequipa pottery is now highly prized among collectors. In 1913 Rhead was dismissed for not being sufficiently businesslike, as he led his students to experiment with glazes and techniques, and tried to get the best materials for them. His successor at the pottery was directed to reduce production costs.

In 1917, the Bothin Helping Fund was incorporated. This organization, now known as the Bothin Foundation, was responsible for raising the $30,000 needed to build Stone House. It was here that professional and business women could come to rest and recuperate after illness.

As treatment methods for TB changed, the need for the Bothin Convalescent Hospital was reduced. The Bothin property was abandoned from 1922 to 1940.

===== Girl Scout camp =====
In 1948, Miss Ashe offered a small building now known as Little House to the San Francisco Girl Scouts for troop camping. A few years later she made Manor House available for Girl Scout use, and by 1955 the entire Bothin property was offered to the Council for its use. The Girl Scouts developed the property as a camp, and added a swimming pool. They changed the name to the Henry E. Bothin Youth Center.

In the 1950s, Arequipa was closed as a hospital. In 1959 the property was leased to the Girl Scouts. By 1963 both sides of the property began to operate as the Henry E. Bothin Youth Center.

===== Timeline =====
1905
Hill Farm convalescent home for children opened by Henry E. Bothin
1910

- Bothin Convalescent Home Board founded and 152 acres (0.62 km^{2}) is deeded.
- Manor House built.
- Arequipa built.

1917
Bothin Helping Fund was incorporated to distribute funds under the terms of H. Bothin.
1919
Stone House completed.
1922–1940
Bothin was abandoned.
1948
Use of Little House and Bothin property was offered to Girl Scouts.
1948–1953
During this time, 181 troops, representing 2221 Girl Scouts and 556 leaders, made use of Bothin.
1954
Severely crippled and intellectually disabled Girl Scouts attend camp sessions.
1955

- Use of Bothin offered to Girl Scout for at least 10 years.
- Name changed to Henry E. Bothin Youth Center.

1959
Use of Arequipa offered to Marin Girl Scout Council.
1963
Entire property becomes Henry E. Bothin Youth Center.

=== Girl Scouts of Orange County ===
Girl Scout Council of Orange County
- Owner: GSUSA
- Headquarters: Irvine, California
- Country: United States
- Website girlscoutsoc.org

The council serves nearly 18,000 girls and 12,000 adult volunteers representing every zip code in Orange County (OC). Council offices are located in Irvine, CA.

==== Properties ====
The Argyros Girl Scout Leadership Center (GSLC) located in Newport Beach is Orange County’s hub for Girl Scout STEM (Science, Technology, Engineering, and Math) programs. Visits to the GSLC provide OC Girl Scouts various opportunities to practice leadership the Girl Scout way as they explore 21st Century careers and learn how they can take action to make the world a better place.

In addition to The Argyros Girl Scout Leadership Center, Camp Scherman, and Council Office, Girl Scouts of Orange County operates 4 program centers, located in Anaheim, Laguna Beach, Yorba Linda, and Seal Beach.

Beginning in the fall of 2020 Girl Scouts of Orange County began operating two new Girl Scout Activity Centers located in the Brea Mall and the Shops at Mission Viejo.

==== Camps ====
- Camp Joe Scherman

=== Girl Scouts San Diego ===
Girl Scouts San Diego Council
- Owner: GSUSA
- Headquarters: San Diego, California
- Country: United States
- Chief Executive Officer: Interim Gerry Keshka
- Board Chair: Rick Brooks
- Website sdgirlscouts.org

The council serves about 35,000 members in San Diego and Imperial counties.

Girl Scouts San Diego operates three services centers, based in the city of San Diego, the city of Escondido, and Imperial Valley. The local camps are Camps Winacka and Whispering Oaks both in the Cuyamaca Mountains near Julian. Winacka has 625 acres (253 ha) with two small lakes. Whispering Oaks has 58 acres (23 ha).

=== Girl Scouts of San Gorgonio Council ===
Girl Scouts of San Gorgonio Council
- Owner: GSUSA
- Headquarters: Redlands, California
- Country: United States
- Chief Executive Officer: Cynthia H. Breunig
- Board Chair: Debbie Gradias
- Website gssgc.org

This council serves more than 10,000 girls in Riverside and San Bernardino counties. Council camps are Camp Azalea Trails with 12 acres (4.9 ha) high in the San Jacinto Mountains near Idyllwild and Camp WiWoCa in Yucaipa.

=== Girl Scouts of Southern Nevada ===
In California it serves girls in southern Inyo country.

=== Girl Scouts of The Sierra Nevada ===
This council serves 4,500 girls and 2,000 volunteers in northern Nevada and northeast California Camps:

- Camp Wasiu II was founded in 1988 and is located on 45 acres near Sierra City, California

== International Scouting units in California ==
Cambodian Scouting in exile existed at least into the early 1990s in Los Angeles, alongside fellow Vietnamese Scouting in exile and Laotian Scouting in exile groups. Colonel Oleg Pantyukhov, Chief Scout of Russia, moved to the United States, where large troops of Russian Scouts were established in cities such as San Francisco, Burlingame, California, Los Angeles, etc. Also, Külföldi Magyar Cserkészszövetség Hungarian Scouting maintains four troops in Los Angeles and two in San Francisco. There is also a branch of Polish Scouting for girls in the San Francisco Bay Area.

== See also ==
- Defunct local councils of the Boy Scouts of America in California
- Mount Baden-Powell, California
- Silver Moccasin Trail
- Mount Shasta
- Asociación de Scouts de México, A.C.
