= California Inland Empire Council =

Boy Scout council in California

California Inland Empire Council (#045)
- Owner: Boy Scouts of America
- Headquarters: Redlands, California
- Country: United States
- Founded: 1973
- Scout Executive: Matt Bear
- Website https://iescouts.org/

The California Inland Empire Council (CIEC) of the Boy Scouts of America serves the Inland Empire of California. The service area comprises San Bernardino and Riverside Counties. The CIEC is headquartered in Redlands, California where it has offices and a Scout Shop.

The CIEC was formed in 1973 by merging the Arrowhead Area (#048) and Riverside Area Councils (#045). In 1974, Grayback Council (#024) also merged into the new council. In 2006, the council acquired the San Bernardino County portions of Old Baldy Council (#043). The council territory includes all of Riverside and San Bernardino Counties.

== History ==
The Riverside Area Council (#045) was founded in 1919 as the Riverside Council. 1927 the Hemet-San Jacinto Valley Council (#028) merged into the Riverside Area Council (#045). In 1944, the council changed its name to Riverside County and Redlands, and then in 1945, it went back to Riverside County. The Grayback Council (#024) was founded in 1945 as the Redlands Area Council. It changed its name in 1952. The Arrowhead Area (#048) council was formed in 1922 as the San Bernardino Valley Council. Before adopting Arrowhead Area in 1933, the council was known as the San Bernardino District from 1923 to 1933.

Old Baldy Council; 1921-2006
San Bernardino Valley Council; 1922-1923	San Bernardino District Council; 1923-1933	Arrowhead Area Council; 1933-1972	California Inland Empire Council; 1973-Present (2022)
Hemet-San Jacinto Valley Council; 1923-1927
Riverside Council; 1919-1920	Riverside County Council; 1920-1944	Riverside County & Redlands; 1944-1945	Riverside County Council; 1945-1972
Redlands Council; 1919-1921	Redlands Area; 1945-1952	Greyback Council; 1952-1974

== Organization ==
- Gray Arrow District - Redlands and San Bernardino Area
- High Desert District - Hesperia to Barstow
- Mt. Rubidoux District - Greater Riverside, Hemet, and San Jacinto
- Sunrise District - Palm Springs, Rancho Mirage, Palm Desert, and other desert communities.
- Tahquitz District - Temecula, Menifee, and Lake Elsinore
- Temescal District - Corona, Norco, and Chino Hills
- Old Baldy District - Ontario, Montclair, Upland, and Rancho Cucamonga

== Camps ==
- Camp Emerson, in Idyllwild-Pine Cove, California. The council has operated since 1919, largely on land donated to the former Riverside County Council by developer and humanitarian Lee Emerson. Camp Emerson has two major distinctions: it is the longest continuously operated Scout Camp west of the Mississippi and has the highest climbing tower for a scout camp west of the Mississippi. Camp Emerson provides a year-round program and camping to Scouts, their families, and outside organizations.
- Camp Helendade SOLD 2000 (no longer owned by the council), near Running Springs, California. Council operated since 1960. It was partially burned in the California October 2007 fires. Camp Helendade was given to Arrowhead Area Council in 1960 by Helen and Dade Davis, replacing Camp Arataba, which is located in the Barton Flats area. Camp Arataba, part of the history of Arrowhead Area Council since the 1920s, was the victim of a lodge fire in 1960. The loss inspired the Davises to donate the land for a camp to the Boy Scouts. Camp Helendade was originally called Camp Running Springs. Still, Edward Saxton, the Scout Executive of Arrowhead Area Council at the time, wanted to name the new camp in a manner that honored the donors. Hence, the name Helendade (Helen + Dade) was selected.

== Order of the Arrow ==
The council is served by the Cahuilla Lodge #127. It currently has six chapters. The Lodge was formed on January 1, 1973, from the merger of Tahquitz Lodge # 127 and Wisumahi Lodge # 478. In 1974, the Lodge welcomed A-tsa Lodge # 380 into the family to make the territory of the Lodge as we know it today. With the merger of the Old Baldy Council, Navajo Lodge #98 also was merged into the Cahuilla Lodge. The Lodge has received many awards, local and national, in its history, including the National Service Award (2001), the E. Urner Goodman Camping Award (most recently in 2006), and the Section W4B Spirit Award (17 times in 29 years; most recently in 2006 (tie)).

== See also ==
- Scouting in California
