= El Dorado Fire =

2020 wildfire in Southern California, US

- Part of the 2020 California wildfires
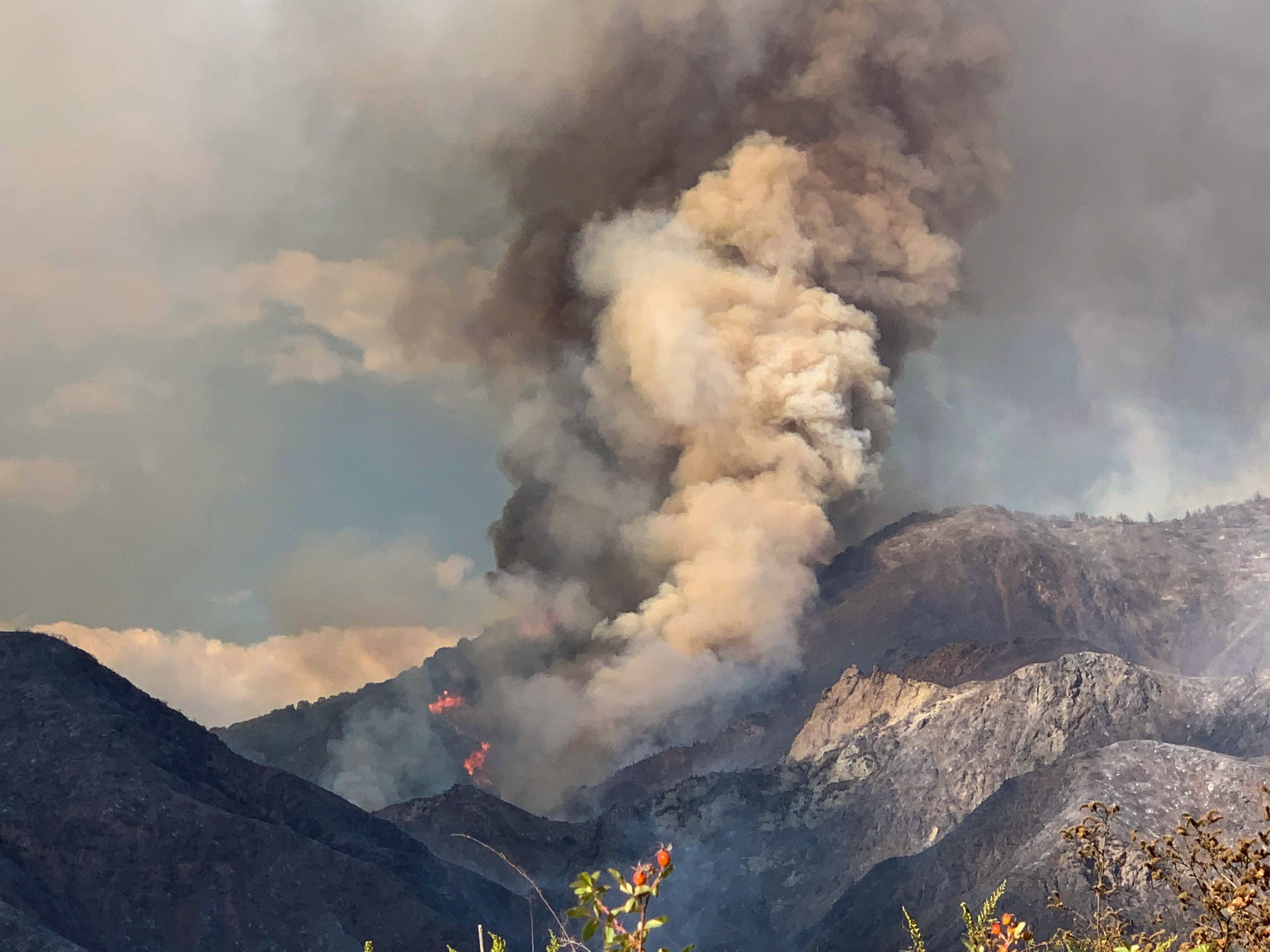
- El Dorado Fire on September 5, 2020
- Date: September 5 –; November 16, 2020; (73 days)
- Location: San Bernardino and Riverside counties, Southern California, United States
- Coordinates: 34°03′29″N 116°59′22″W

Statistics
- Burned area: 22,744 acres (9,204 ha; 35.538 mi^{2})

Impacts
- Deaths: 1 firefighter
- Injuries: 12
- Structures destroyed: 10 structures destroyed, 6 structures damaged
- Cost: ≥$42 million

Ignition
- Cause: Pyrotechnic device at gender reveal party

Map
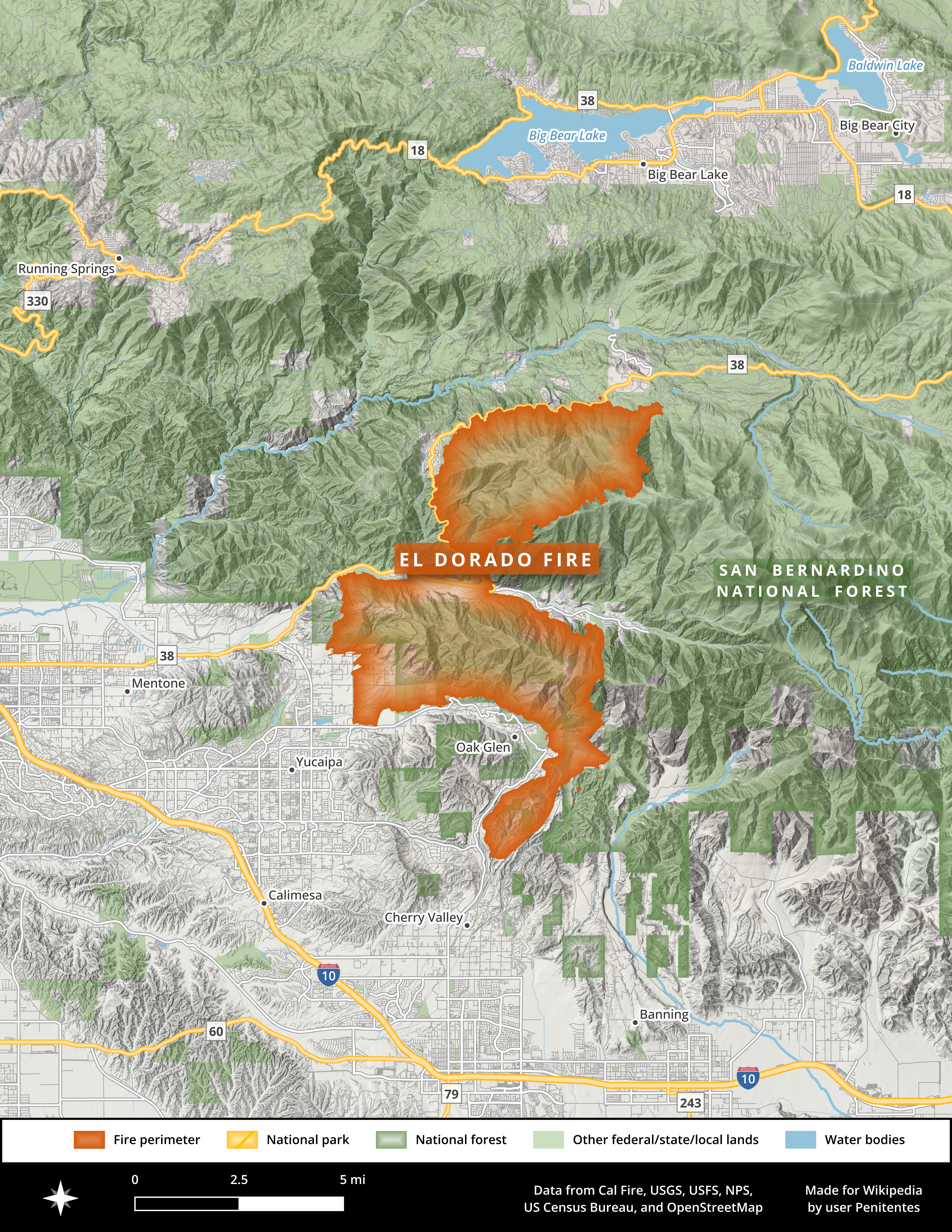
- The fire largely burned in the San Bernardino National Forest south of Big Bear Lake and north of Oak Glen

- Location in Southern California

The El Dorado Fire was a wildfire that burned 22,744 acres (9,204 ha; 35.538 mi^{2}; 92.04 km^{2}) in San Bernardino and Riverside counties of California, United States, from September to November 2020. It was ignited on September 5 by a pyrotechnic device at a gender reveal party in El Dorado Ranch Park and quickly spread to the San Gorgonio Wilderness Area of the San Bernardino National Forest. Burning over a 71-day period, the fire destroyed 20 structures and killed one firefighter, for which the couple hosting the party were charged with involuntary manslaughter.

== Cause ==
The fire began at 10:23 a.m. (PDT) on September 5, 2020, when Angela Renee Jimenez and Refugio Manuel Jimenez Jr. set off a smoke bomb at a gender reveal photoshoot at the El Dorado Ranch Park near Yucaipa, in southern San Bernardino County. Heat from the smoke bomb caused nearby dry grass to catch on fire, which spread rapidly. According to the California Department of Forestry and Fire Protection (CAL FIRE), the Jimenezes attempted to extinguish the fire with bottled water, then reported the fire to the authorities and cooperated with their investigation. The cause of the fire inspired widespread mockery and condemnation against gender reveal parties, and was frequently compared to the 2017 Sawmill Fire, ignited by an exploding target at a gender reveal party in Arizona.

== Progression ==
First responders arrived and began to attempt suppression of the El Dorado Fire at 10:40 a.m., when it had an area of five acres (2.0 ha). Because of the steep terrain, temperatures exceeding 100 °F (38 °C), and low humidity, the fire spread rapidly northward and grew to an area of 7,050 acres (2,850 ha) on September 6. In response to the fire's spread, California Governor Gavin Newsom declared a state of emergency in San Bernardino County, and evacuations were ordered in Mountain Home Village, Oak Glen, Forest Falls, and Yucaipa. A 12-mile (19 km) stretch of California State Route 38 and the San Gorgonio Wilderness Area of the San Bernardino National Forest (SBNF) were closed.

On September 7, the fire grew to 9,671 acres (3,914 ha). Firefighters halted its advance south, though evacuation notices were issued to residents of Riverside County, to the south of San Bernardino County, and the SBNF was closed. Lower temperatures and higher humidity on September 8 briefly slowed the spread of the El Dorado Fire, which grew to 11,259 acres (4,556 ha) and prompted more evacuations in San Bernardino County. On September 9, the annual Santa Ana winds fanned the El Dorado Fire, which grew to 14,043 acres (5,683 ha) by the morning of September 12.

In spite of winds, continued high temperatures, and low humidity, firefighters made enough progress containing the spread of the El Dorado Fire to allow for the lifting of evacuation orders in Yucaipa and Oak Glen on September 10, September 11, September 12, and September 13, and Riverside County on September 10. Angelus Oaks and Forest Falls were evacuated at the same time, however, and residents of Big Bear were advised to evacuate. On September 15, CAL FIRE estimated that the spread of the fire, then at 17,892 acres (7,241 ha), was 61 percent contained.

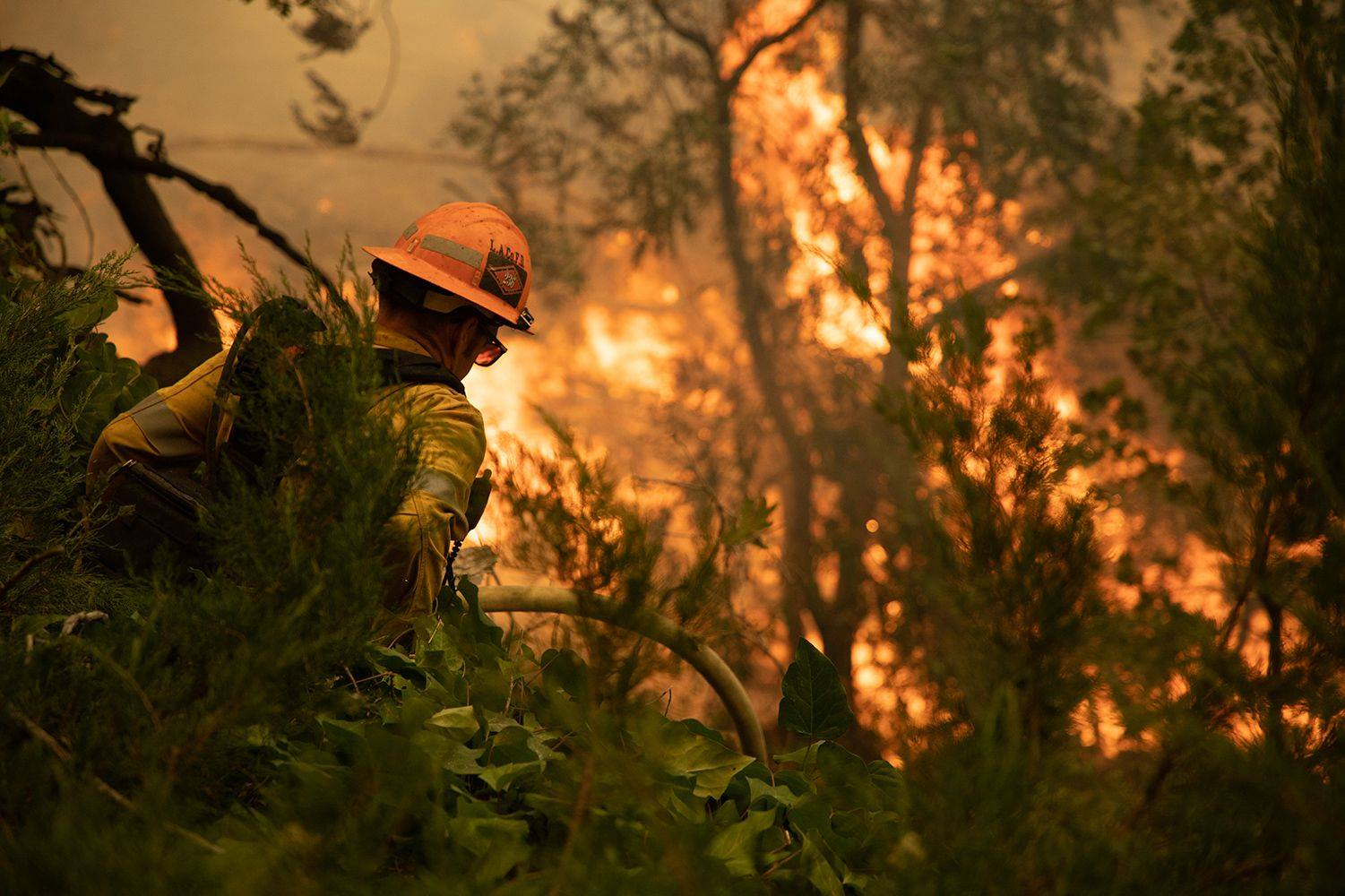
A firefighter at the El Dorado Fire on September 10

On September 17 the El Dorado Fire crossed State Route 38 and grew to 21,678 acres (8,773 ha) by the next day. While U.S. Forest Service Hotshot crews conducted controlled burns near Angelus Oaks on September 17, wind gusts created local fires that resulted in the death of a firefighter. On September 18 residents of Forest Falls and Mountain Home Village were allowed to return to their homes. By September 24, the fire had grown to 22,604 acres (9,148 ha), but was estimated to be 81 percent contained and the evacuation order for Angelus Oaks was lifted. Containment reached 93 percent on September 28, and it continued to burn until November 16.

== Effects ==
The El Dorado Fire burned 22,744 acres (9,204 ha) over 71 days, reaching its maximum extent by September 29. It cost $42,269,660 to suppress. The fire resulted in the death of a single firefighter and 13 other injuries; 20 buildings were destroyed. State Route 38 was reopened on September 29, 2020. Some areas of the SBNF remained closed until April 2022.

=== Environmental consequences ===
The El Dorado Fire burned steep mountain terrain already prone to landslide, rockfall, and debris flow hazards. Landslides and rockfalls began in September 2020 as the fire eroded the soil of its burn scar, and plagued San Bernardino County during and after its duration. Storms and the threat of mudflows triggered evacuation orders and advisories for communities in San Bernardino and Riverside Counties in January 2021, July 2021, December 2021, and September 2022.

=== Prosecution ===
The San Bernardino County District Attorney's Office began assembling a case for the prosecution of the Jimenezes in January 2021. The couple were formally charged with involuntary manslaughter, a felony, among other felony and misdemeanor charges on July 20, 2021; they pleaded not guilty. The Jimenezes requested the dismissal of all charges against them in December 2021 and again in October 2022. The judge denied the dismissal of most of the charges both times. On January 23, 2023, a Superior Court judge in San Bernardino dismissed one charge out of 30 against the Jimenezes.

On February 9, 2024, after pleading guilty to one felony count of involuntary manslaughter and two felony counts of recklessly causing fire to an inhabited structure, Refugio Manuel Jimenez Jr. was sentenced to one year in county jail and two years of felony probation and community service. Angelina Jimenez, who pleaded guilty to three misdemeanor counts of recklessly causing a fire to another's property, was sentenced to one year of summary probation and community service. Additionally, the couple was ordered to pay $1,789,972 in restitution to victims of the fire.

== See also ==
- 2020 California wildfires
