= KLJR-FM =

Radio station in Santa Paula, California

Coordinates: 34.326°N 119.039°W

- Santa Paula, California; United States
- Broadcast area: Oxnard–Ventura, California
- Frequency: 96.7 MHz
- Branding: La Mejor 96.7 FM

Programming
- Format: Classic Spanish Adult Contemporary and Ranchera music

Ownership
- Owner: Lazer Media; (Lazer Licenses, LLC)
- Sister stations: KXTT, KJOR, KSMY, KXSB, KAEH

History
- First air date: 1976; 50 years ago (as KAAP-FM)
- Former call signs: KAAP-FM (1976–1982); KKBZ-FM (1982–1986); KIEZ (1986–1989); KXPT (1989–1990); KXBS (1990–1998); KCZN (1998–2004)
- Call sign meaning: La MeJoR

Technical information
- Licensing authority: FCC
- Facility ID: 35925
- Class: A
- ERP: 280 watts
- HAAT: 457 meters (1,499 ft)
- Repeater: 96.7 KLJR-FM1 (Ventura) (booster)

Links
- Public license information: Public file; LMS
- Webcast: Listen Live
- Website: KLJR-FM Online

KLJR-FM (96.7 MHz "La Mejor") is a radio station that is licensed to Santa Paula, California and broadcasts to the Oxnard–Ventura radio market. The station is owned by Lazer Media and airs a classic Spanish Adult Contemporary and Ranchera music format.

== History ==
=== Early years ===
The station went on the air as KAAP-FM in 1976 with an adult contemporary format. In 1982, it became album rock outlet KKBZ-FM ("The Buzz") before flipping to soft rock four years later as KIEZ. After being sold in 1989, KIEZ became KXPT ("The Point"), switching to smooth jazz.

On August 10, 1990, KXPT changed its call letters to KXBS and adopted an oldies format called "The Bus 96.7". In 1995, the station began airing a short-lived alternative rock format.

In April 1997, KXBS flipped to Spanish Adult Contemporary music.

=== Radio Lazer era (1997–present) ===
In November 1997, Lazer Broadcasting purchased KXBS for $1 million, retaining the Spanish Adult Hits format. The station's callsign changed to KCZN on September 18, 1998, to match the new "Corazón" branding.

KCZN adopted the current call letters, regional Mexican format, and slogan in 2004, switching to KLJR-FM on September 2.

KLJR-FM has one booster station, KLJR-FM1 in Ventura, also broadcasting on a frequency of 96.7 MHz.
