= KCAL =

KCAL may refer to:

- KCAL (AM), a radio station (1410 AM) licensed to Redlands, California, United States
- KCAL-FM, a radio station (96.7 FM) licensed to Redlands, California, United States
- KCAL-TV, a television station (channel 9) licensed to Los Angeles, California, United States
- kcal, kilocalorie (1,000 calories), a unit of energy (sometimes referred to as 1 Calorie, with a capital C, as opposed to a small c).
