= Barton Flats, California =

Recreation area in California

Barton Flats is a recreation area located in the San Bernardino National Forest near San Gorgonio Mountain. The nearest major town is Big Bear Lake, California.

== History ==
A fire began approximately at 4:00 p.m. on June 17, 2015, behind Camp de Benneville Pines in the Jenks Lake area of Barton Flats. The cause remains unknown.

The flames traveled east and southeast. The surrounding Mojave Desert was filled with ash and smoke, hiding the sun for three days. On June 27, rain put out the fire.

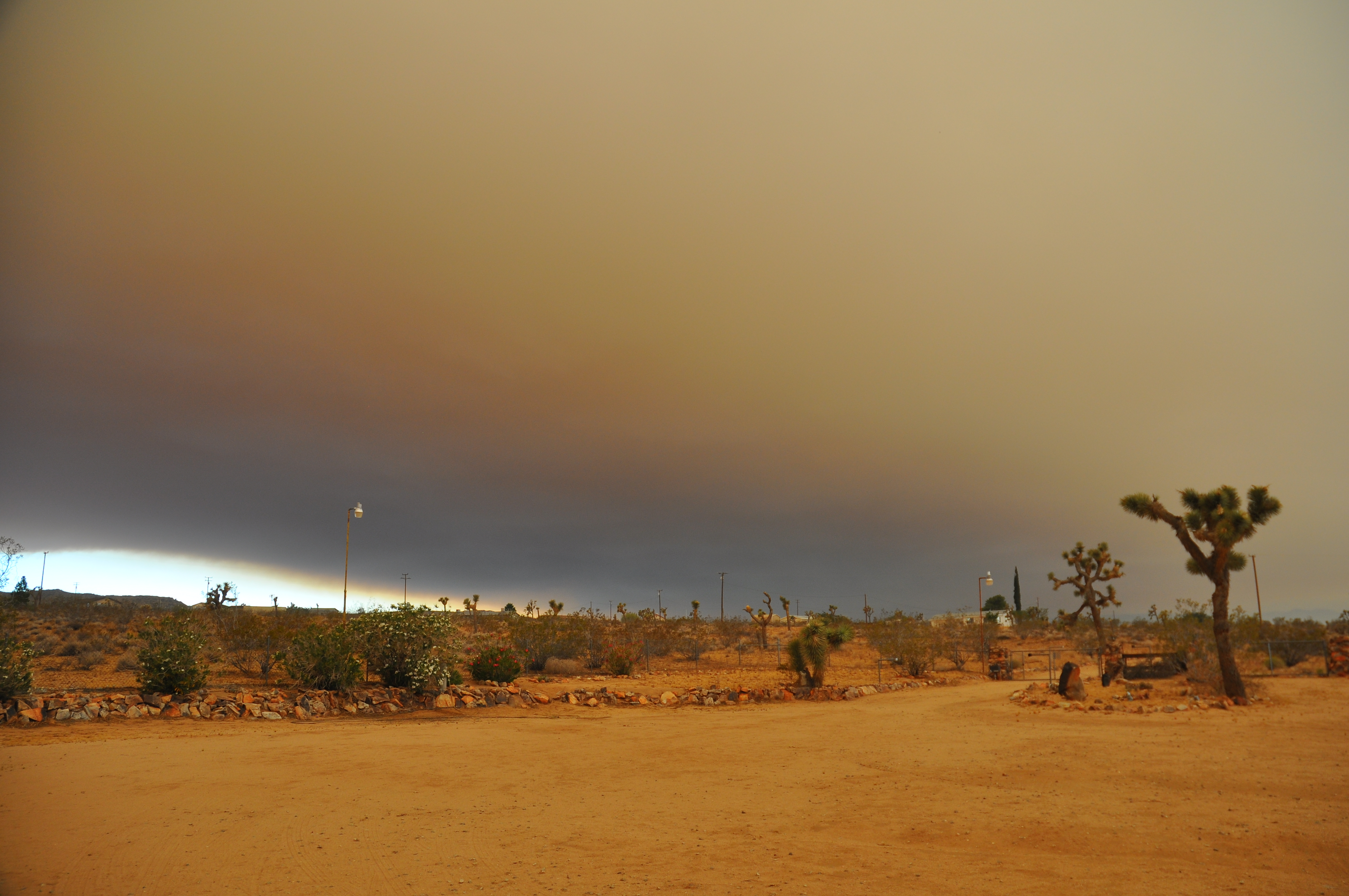
Mojave Desert, southeast and below San Gorgonio Mountain, June 18, 2015

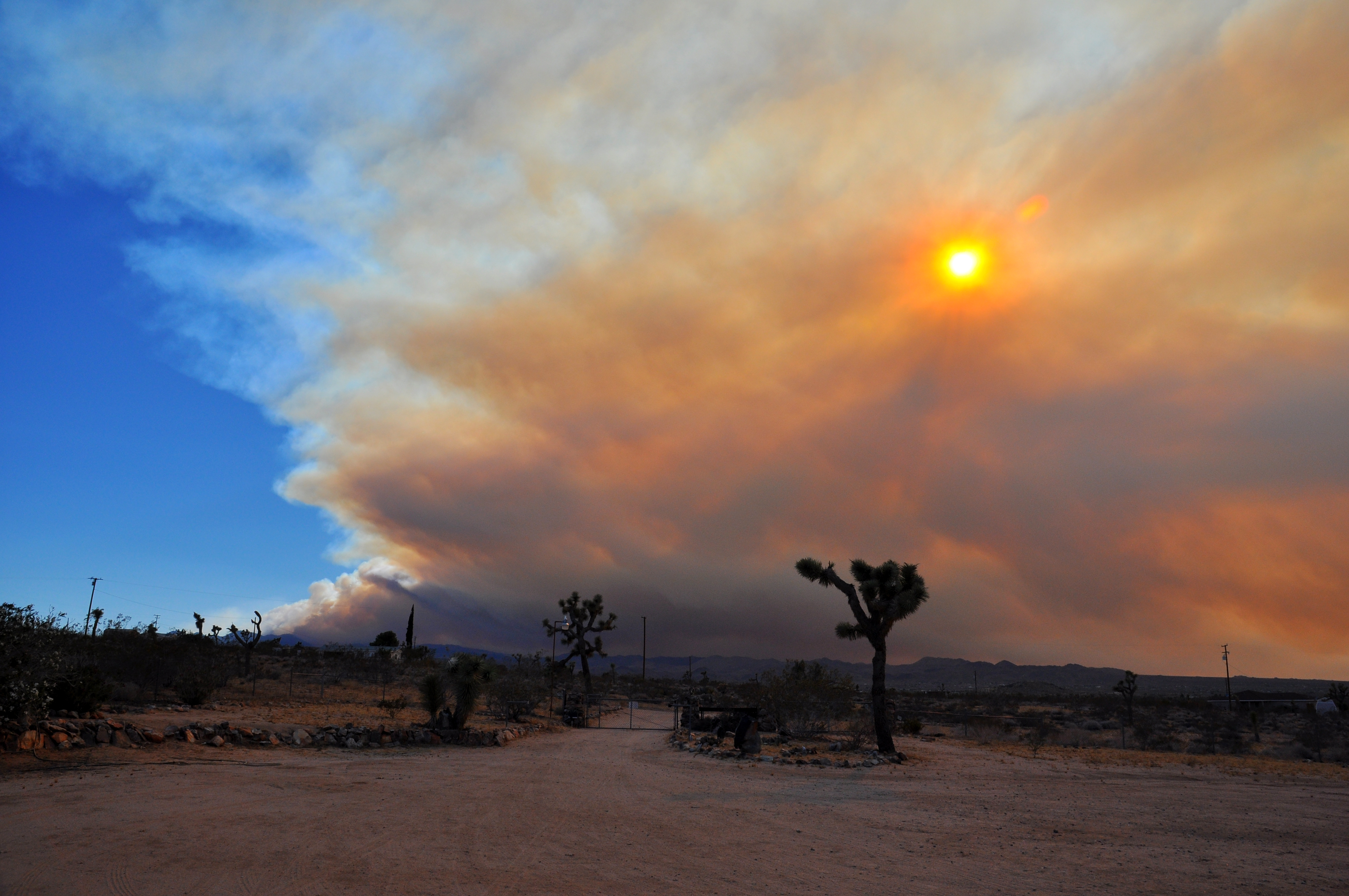
Six days later on 24 June, 2015, the Barton Flats fire was still going strong

== Geography ==
Barton Flats is the southern gateway to Big Bear Lake, California, via California State Route 38.

Jenks Lake is located in the Barton Flats area. In addition, there are several trailheads located in Barton Flats. Most notably, the South Fork Santa Ana River trail.
