= California State Route 330 =

State highway in San Bernardino County, California, United States

State Route 330
- SR 330 highlighted in red

Route information
- Maintained by Caltrans
- Length: 15.422 mi (24.819 km)
- Existed: 1972 (from SR 30)–present

Major junctions
- South end: SR 210 in San Bernardino
- North end: SR 18 at Running Springs

Location
- Country: United States
- State: California
- Counties: San Bernardino

Highway system
- State highways in California; Interstate; US; State; Scenic; History; Pre‑1964; Unconstructed; Deleted; Freeways
← SR 299	→ SR 371

State Route 330 (SR 330) is a state highway in the U.S. state of California, connecting SR 210 in the city of San Bernardino with the San Bernardino National Forest and SR 18 at Running Springs. SR 330 is also known as City Creek Road in the San Bernardino Mountains.

== Route description ==
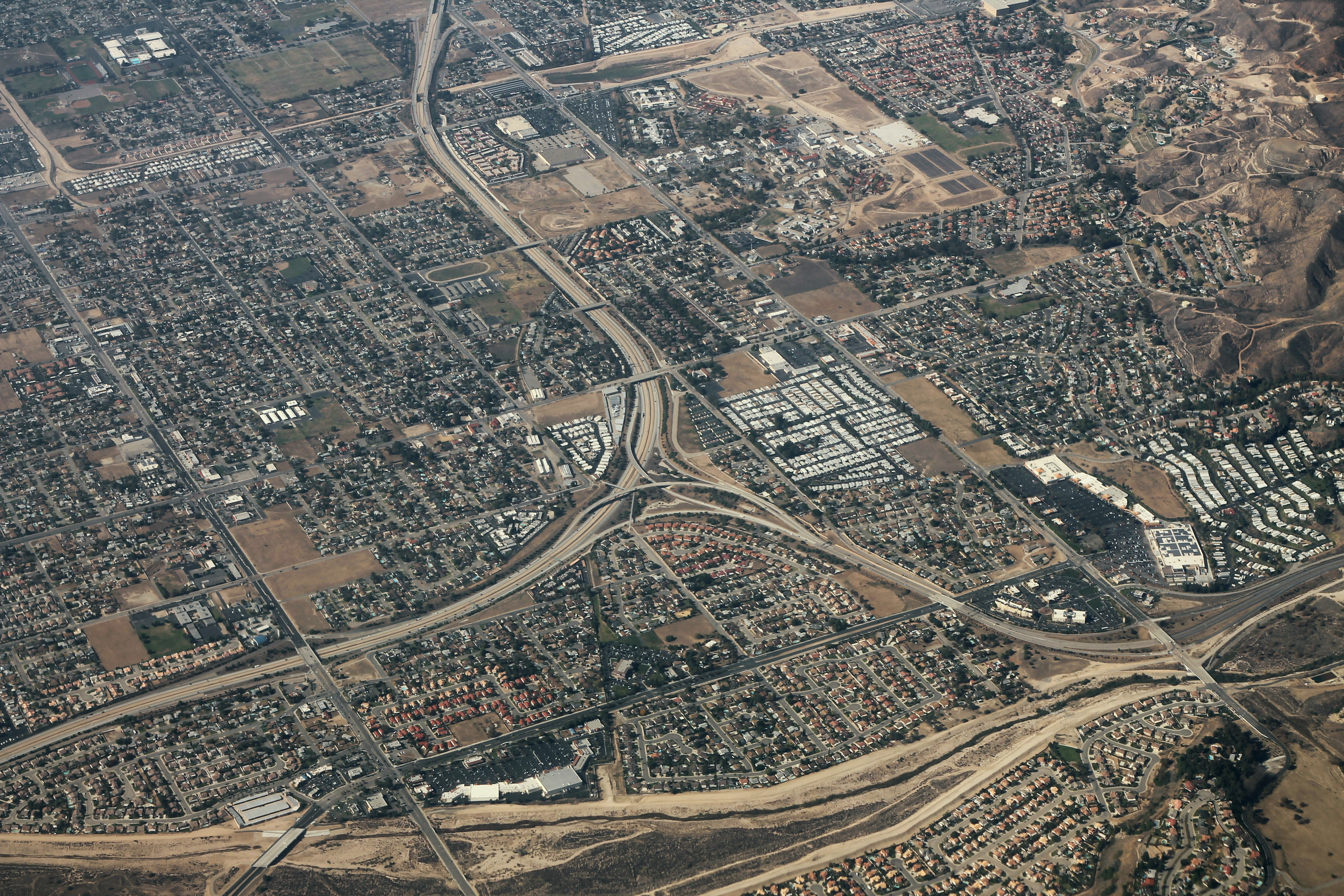
CA 330 junction with CA 210

Route 330 is defined in section 603 of the California Streets and Highways Code, and that the highway is "from Route 210 near Highland northeasterly to Route 18".

At its southern terminus, SR 330 begins in San Bernardino at SR 210. It is a four lane freeway for approximately a mile, then turns into a two-lane expressway for four additional miles and a conventional two-lane highway for the remainder of its length. It runs northeasterly from the San Bernardino Valley into the mountains to Running Springs, where it ends at State Route 18. The entire route is in San Bernardino County.

SR 330 consists of approximately 15 miles (24 km) of six-percent grade road, and is one of three roads from the San Bernardino Valley to the resorts of the San Bernardino National Forest. It alternates between long, straight stretches and curved sections. There are three passing lanes, at the 2,200-foot (670 m) level, the 4,000-foot (1,200 m) level, and the 5,600-foot (1,700 m) level.

SR 330 is part of the California Freeway and Expressway System, and the southernmost freeway portion is part of the National Highway System, a network of highways that are considered essential to the country's economy, defense, and mobility by the Federal Highway Administration. SR 330 is eligible to be included in the State Scenic Highway System, but it is not officially designated as a scenic highway by the California Department of Transportation.

== History ==
SR 330 was originally a part of Legislative Route 207, defined in 1937. It was signed as SR 30 until 1972, when that route was redefined to continue south along former SR 106 rather than continue northeasterly along SR 330.

Not including Interstate and U.S. highways, SR 330 was one of only three routes in California which is numbered based on the number of a current or former parent route (the others being SR 299 and SR 371). This relationship was lost once the remaining portions of former SR 30 were signed as SR 210.

In December 2010, a part of SR 330 was washed out, forcing the closure of the entire route for several months. Access to the route was restricted to local residents only. It was reopened in May 2011. Its closure was cited as a reason for low attendance at ski resorts for the year, as SR 330 links to the resorts.

== Major intersections ==
All exits are unnumbered along the freeway segment of SR 330 between SR 210 and Highland Avenue. Except where prefixed with a letter, postmiles were measured on the road as it was in 1964, based on the alignment of Route 30 as it existed at that time, and do not necessarily reflect current mileage. Postmile prefixes include: R reflecting a realignment in the route since then, M indicating a second realignment, L referring to an overlap due to a correction or change, and T indicating postmiles classified as temporary. Segments that remain unconstructed or have been relinquished to local control may be omitted. The entire route is in San Bernardino County.

Location	Postmile	Destinations	Notes
San Bernardino	R28.70	SR 210 (Foothill Freeway) – Redlands, Pasadena	Southbound exit and northbound entrance; former SR 30; future I-210; SR 210 exit 81
San Bernardino–Highland line	R29.60	Highland Avenue	
San Bernardino		North end of freeway	
Running Springs	43.89	SR 18 (Hilltop Boulevard) – Running Springs	Interchange with northbound exit only
Running Springs	43.89	SR 18 west (Hilltop Boulevard) – Lake Arrowhead	Interchange with southbound exit only
Running Springs	44.12	SR 18 – Big Bear Lake, Lake Arrowhead	
1.000 mi = 1.609 km; 1.000 km = 0.621 mi: Incomplete access
