= Mountain Home Village, California =

Unincorporated community in California, United States

Mountain Home Village
- Unincorporated community
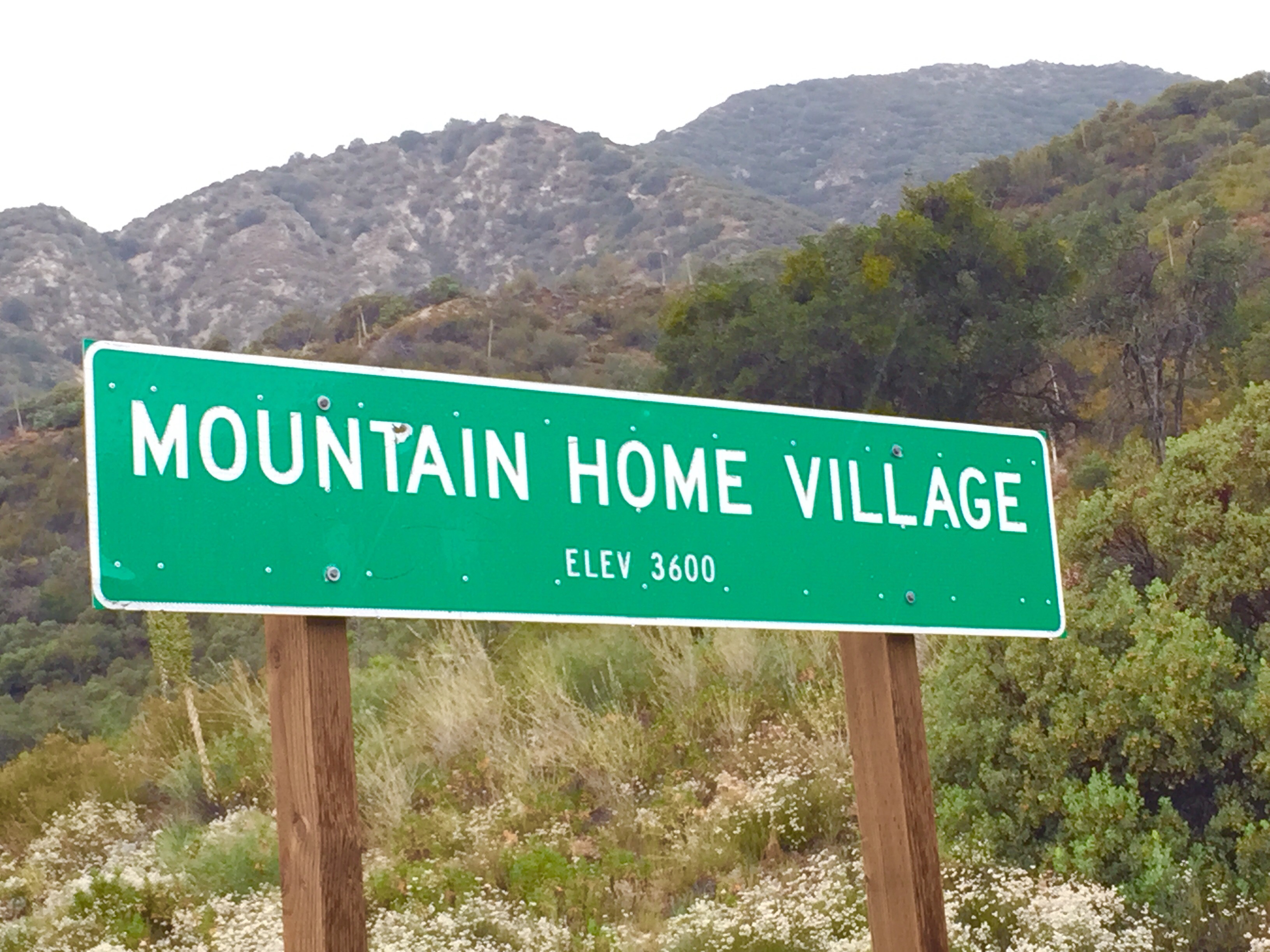
- Mountain Home Village sign

- Location within California Location within the United States
- Coordinates: 34°06′02″N 116°59′57″W
- Country: United States
- State: California
- County: San Bernardino
- Elevation: 3,691 ft (1,125 m)

Population (2010)
  - Total: 170
- Time zone: UTC-8 (Pacific (PST))
  - Summer (DST): UTC-7 (PDT)
- Postal code: 92359
- Area code: 909
- GNIS feature ID: 1656579

Mountain Home Village is an unincorporated community in San Bernardino County, California, United States with a population of 170 full-time residents as of 2010. Mountain Home Village is located along California State Route 38 5.2 miles (8.4 km) north-northeast of Yucaipa. It is located less than a mile east from the Thurman Flats Picnic Area, and the Loch Leven- and Mill Creek Campgrounds are located in the village. It is also where Mill Creek and Mountain Home Creek (which starts in Lake Shadow by nearby Angelus Oaks in the north) meets, while other creeks in area includes Skinner Creek, East Fork Mountain Home Creek, and Frustration Creek. The Mentone Boulders is also located nearby, which is a well-known rock-climbing area. It is located in the San Bernardino Mountains, just at the edge of the San Andreas Fault and offers some extraordinary valley views, and on clear days, also views of the City of San Bernardino. There are also numerous hiking trails located by the village. It is located within the San Bernardino National Forest and is surrounded by pine forest. Its elevation is 3600 feet. In 1956, the Christian Church (Disciples of Christ) purchased a resort in Mountain Home Village and started the Loch Leven Camp & Retreat Center.
