= KXRS =

Radio station in Beaumont, California

Coordinates: 34.0281°N 116.9786°W

- Beaumont, California; United States
- Broadcast area: Inland Empire
- Frequency: 105.5 MHz (HD Radio)
- Branding: Radio Lazer 105.5 FM

Programming
- Format: Regional Mexican

Ownership
- Owner: Lazer Media; (Lazer Licenses, LLC)
- Sister stations: KXSB, KAEH, KCAL-AM

History
- First air date: November 9, 1963 (as KHYE-FM at 105.7)
- Former call signs: KHYE-FM (1963-1978); KHYE (1978-1994)
- Former frequencies: 105.7 MHz (1963-2025)
- Call sign meaning: eXtra RiverSide

Technical information
- Licensing authority: FCC
- Facility ID: 36829
- Class: A
- ERP: 3,100 watts
- HAAT: 312 meters

Links
- Public license information: Public file; LMS
- Website: radiolazer.com/san-bernardino/

KXRS (105.5 FM, "Radio Lazer 105.5 FM" ) is a radio station broadcasting a Regional Mexican music format. Licensed to Beaumont, California, it serves the Inland Empire area. The station is currently owned by Lazer Media. KXRS Has Singal Interfernce in Western Riverside County With 105.5 KBUE FM In Orange County Region.
