= Rim of the World Scenic Byway =

The Rim of the World Scenic Byway is an 107-mile (172 km) National Forest Scenic Byway through the San Bernardino National Forest in the U.S. state of California. It consists of the following routes:

- California State Route 138 from near the Cajon Pass to near Crestline
- California State Route 18 from near Crestline to Big Bear Dam
- California State Route 38 from Big Bear Dam to the San Bernardino National Forest boundary near Mill Creek Canyon
