= Onyx Summit =

Mountain pass in San Bernardino County, California, United States

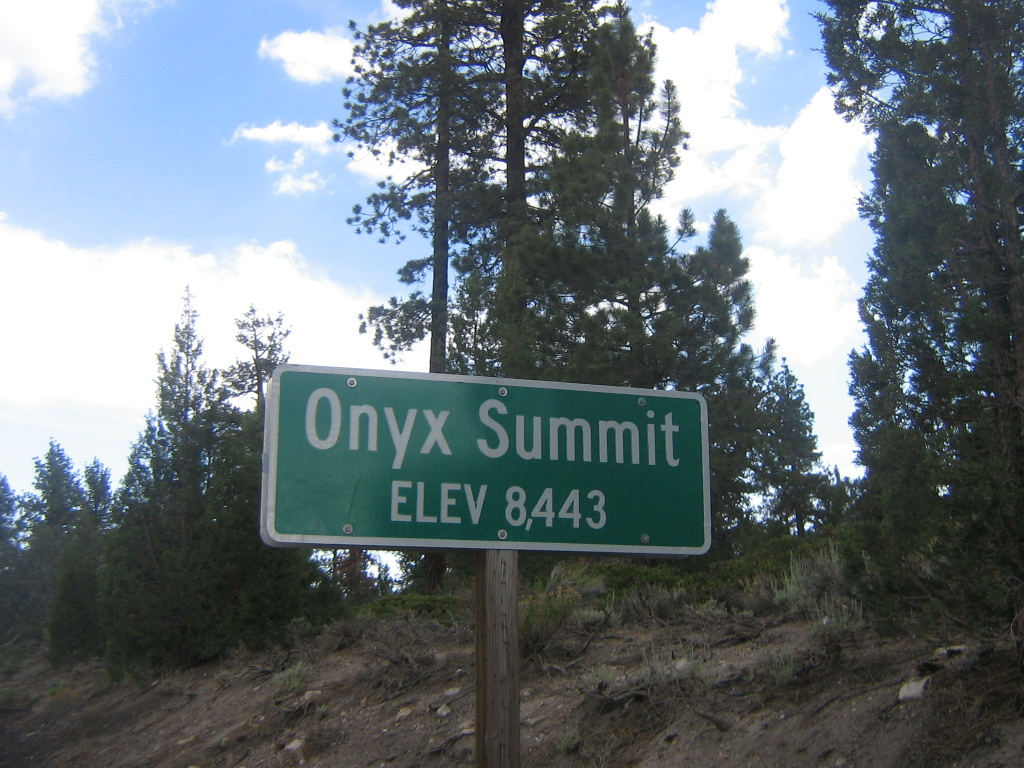

- Location within southern California Location within California
- Elevation: 8,443 feet (2,573 m)
- Traversed by: SR 38

Third Approach
- Location: San Bernardino County, California, United States
- Range: San Bernardino Mountains
- Coordinates: 34°11.533′N 116°43.133′W

Onyx Summit is a mountain pass located in the San Bernardino Mountains in the southwestern part of San Bernardino County, California, United States. Situated at an elevation of 8,443 ft. (2,573 m), it is the highest mountain pass in Southern California. California State Route 38 traverses it at postmile 39.37 in the eastern part of San Bernardino National Forest.

== See also ==
- List of mountain passes in California
