= KXSB =

Coordinates: 34.213°N 116.867°W

- Big Bear Lake, California; United States
- Broadcast area: San Bernardino County, California / West Riverside County, California
- Frequency: 101.7 MHz
- Branding: La Mejor 101.7 FM y 103.7 FM

Programming
- Format: Spanish Adult Hits

Ownership
- Owner: Lazer Media; (Lazer Licenses, LLC)
- Sister stations: KXRS, KAEH, KCAL-AM

History
- Call sign meaning: eXtra San Bernardino

Technical information
- Licensing authority: FCC
- Facility ID: 43999
- Class: A
- ERP: 300 watts
- HAAT: 431 meters (1,414 ft)

Links
- Public license information: Public file; LMS
- Website: https://lamejornetwork.com/san-bernardino/

KXSB (101.7 FM) is a radio station broadcasting Spanish-language Adult Hits format. It is known as La Mejor. Licensed to Big Bear Lake, California, United States, it serves San Bernardino County, California. The station is currently owned by Lazer Media. It is simulcast on KIQQ-FM, which serves the High Desert area.
