= Jenks Lake =

Lake in the state of California, United States

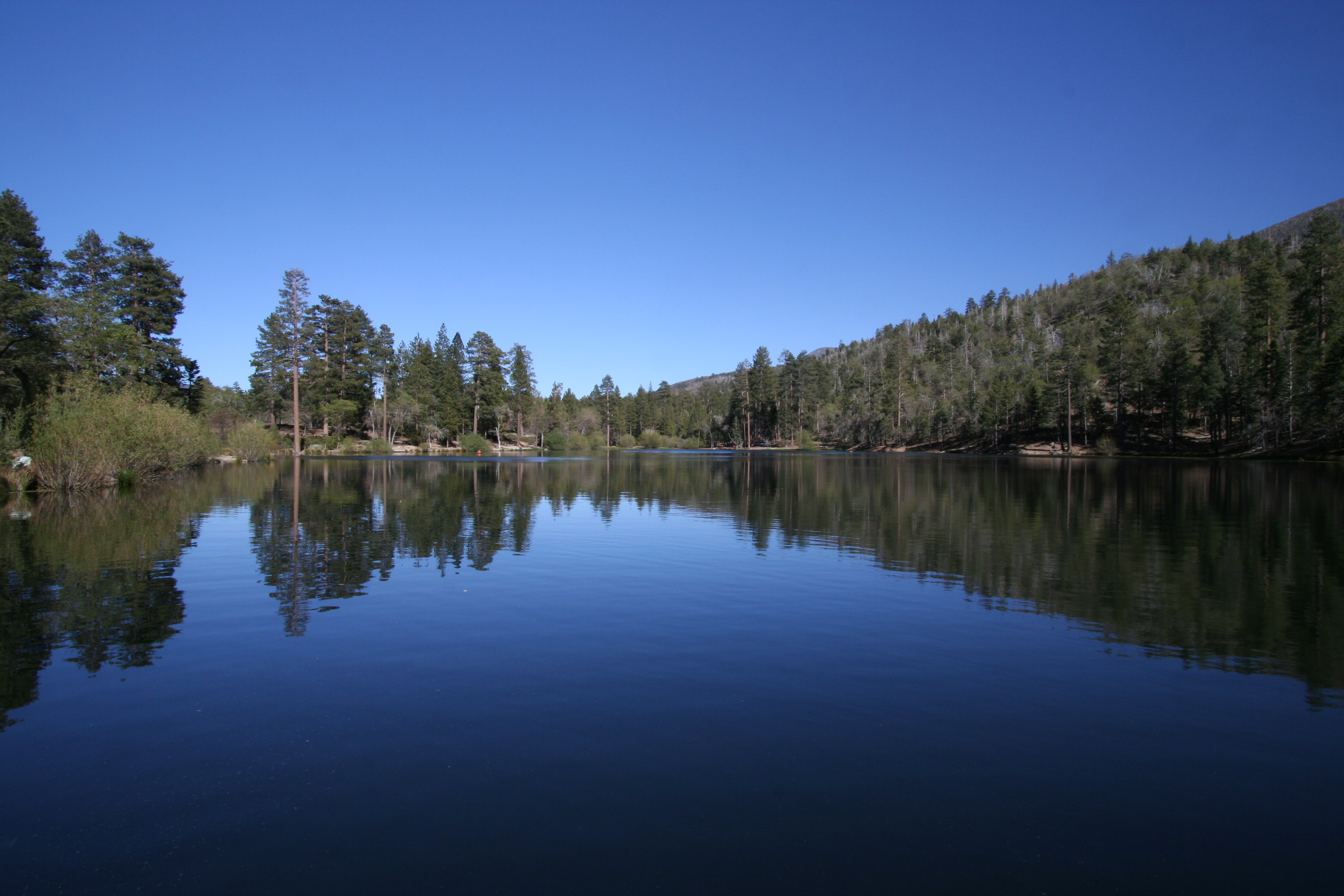

- Location within California Location within the United States
- Location: San Bernardino National Forest; San Bernardino County, California, United States
- Coordinates: 34.164454°N 116.881973°W
- Primary inflows: Frog Creek
- Basin countries: United States
- Surface elevation: 2,054 m (6,739 ft)

Jenks Lake is a lake in the San Bernardino National Forest near Angelus Oaks in San Bernardino County, California. The lake offers several fish species including bass, catfish, bluegill, and rainbow trout. Trout season usually runs from April to October.

Although the lake is man-made, it receives water diverted from the Santa Ana River via a flume, visible from the popular South Fork Trail.

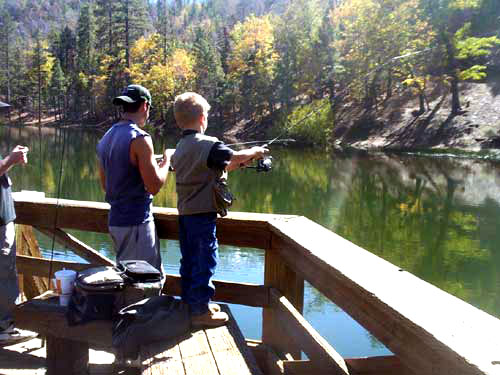
Casting a lite fishing rod with 2-lb line

== Area lakes and rivers ==
- Green Valley Lake
- Big Bear Lake
- Arrowbear Lake
- Santa Ana River

== See also ==
- List of lakes in California
