= California State Route 18 =

State route in Los Angeles and San Bernardino counties in California, United States

State Route 18
- SR 18 highlighted in red

Route information
- Maintained by Caltrans
- Length: 117.21 mi (188.63 km)
- Existed: 1934–present
- Tourist routes: Rim of the World Scenic Byway

Major junctions
- Clockwise end: SR 210 in San Bernardino
- SR 138 near Crestline; SR 173 near Lake Arrowhead; SR 330 in Running Springs; SR 38 in Big Bear Lake; I-15 in Victorville; US 395 at the Victorville–Adelanto border
- Counterclockwise end: SR 138 near Llano

Location
- Country: United States
- State: California
- Counties: San Bernardino, Los Angeles

Highway system
- State highways in California; Interstate; US; State; Scenic; History; Pre‑1964; Unconstructed; Deleted; Freeways
← SR 17	→ SR 19

State Route 18 (SR 18) is a state highway in the U.S. state of California. It serves as a primary route into the San Bernardino Mountains, both from the Riverside–San Bernardino metropolitan area from the south and the Mojave Desert from the north. SR 18 runs from State Route 210 in San Bernardino to State Route 138 in Llano. SR 18 also forms a concurrency with State Route 38 in Big Bear City and another with Interstate 15 in Victorville.

== Route description ==
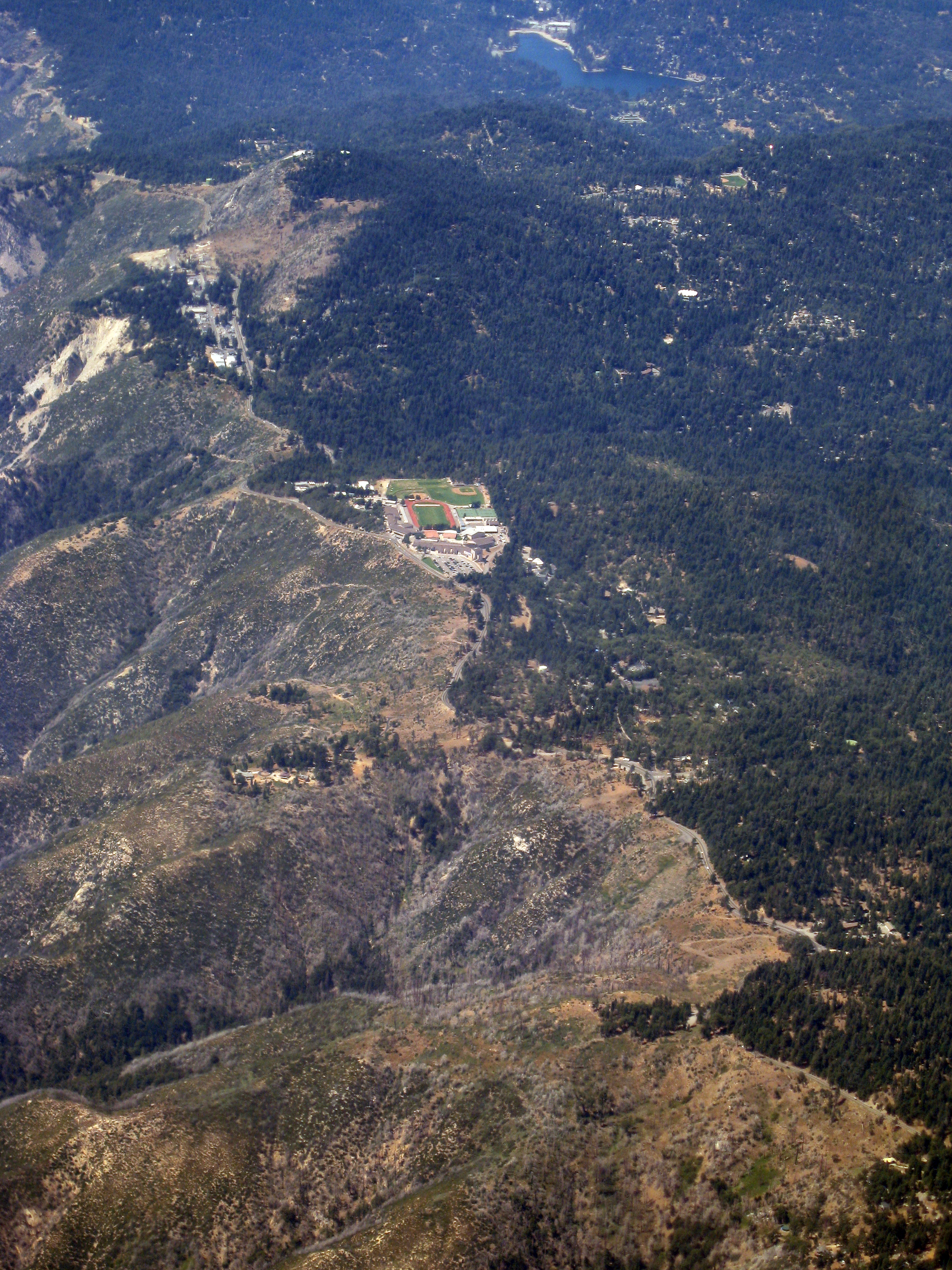
Rim of the World Highway runs along the ridge here, marking the boundary between the areas burned by the October 2007 wildfires and those not. Rim of the World High School is there as well.

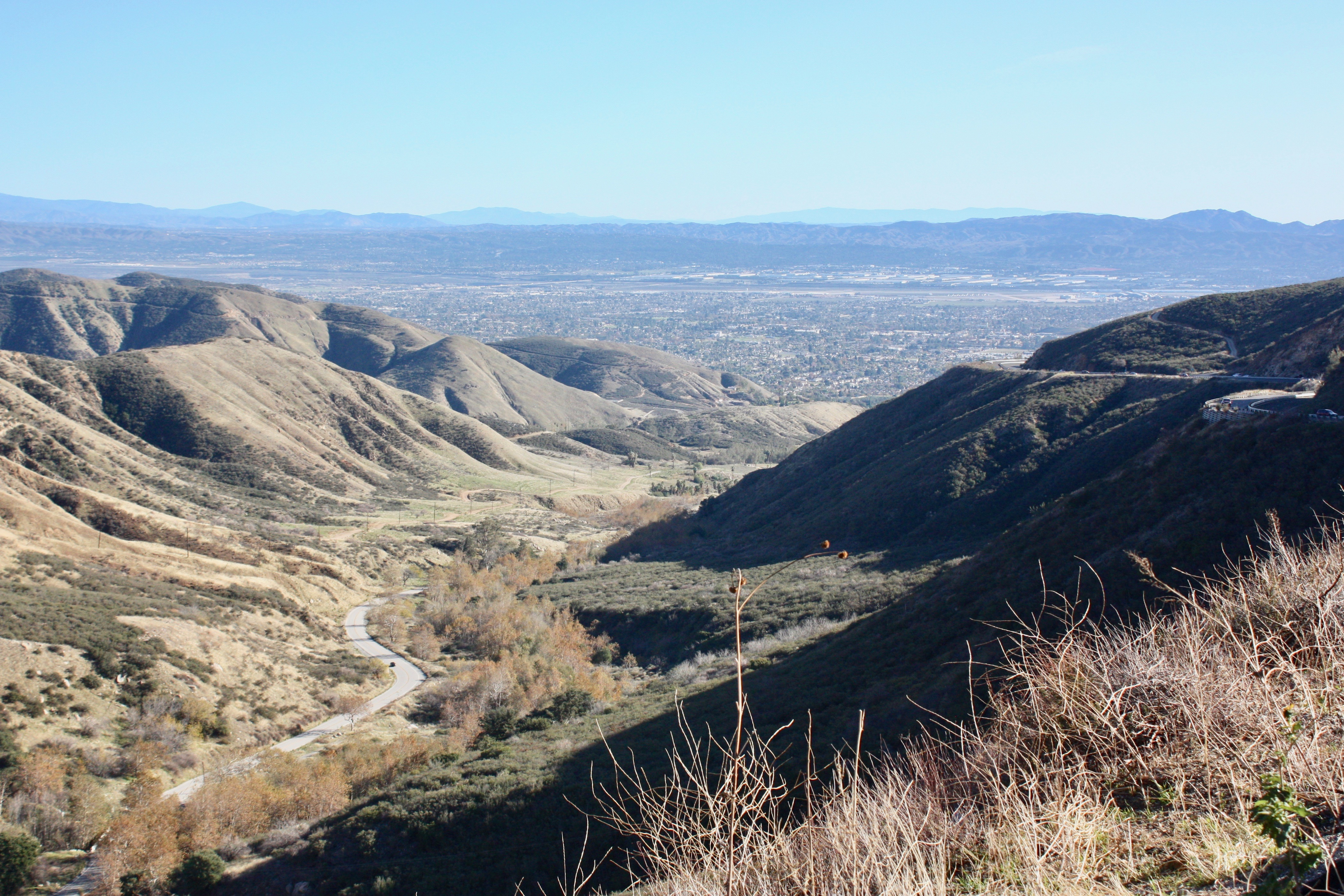
Panoramic views of San Bernardino from California State Route 18.

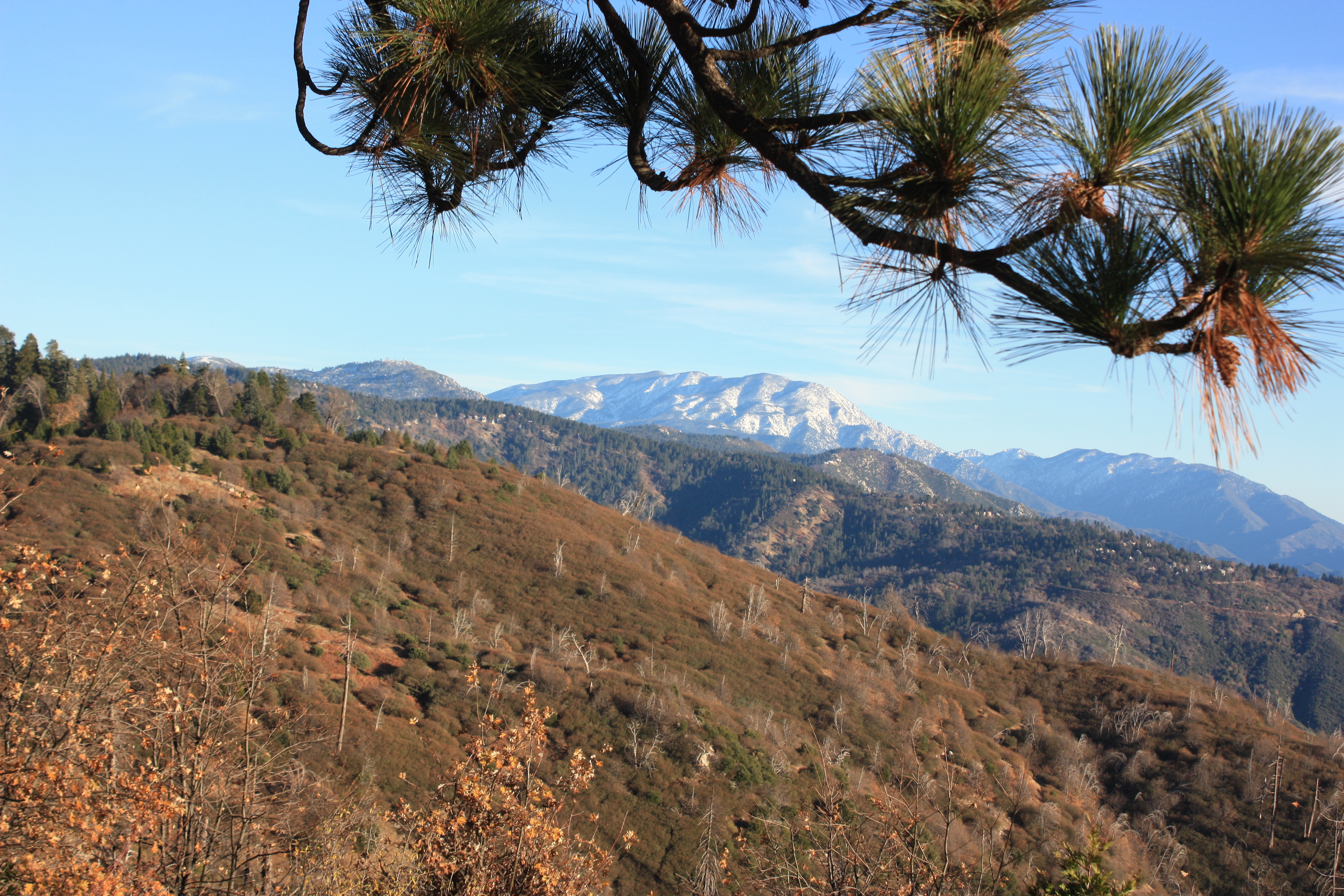
Roadside view of snow-capped mountains from California State Route 18 just east of Rte 189 turnoff to Arrowhead Lake.

Route 18 is defined in section 318 of the California Streets and Highways Code:

Route 18 is from:
(a) Route 10 near San Bernardino to Route 210.
(b) Route 210 near San Bernardino to Route 15 in Victorville via Big Bear Lake.
(c) Route 15 near Victorville to Route 138 near Pearblossom.

The highway was never constructed south to Route 10 as defined. It also omits the concurrency with Route 15 through Victorville instead of duplicating those segments in those other routes' definitions in the code.

The constructed portion of Route 18 begins at State Route 210 and quickly enters the San Bernardino Mountains as a four-lane expressway. SR 18 is known as Waterman Avenue in the city of San Bernardino before turning into SR 18. The route climbs north at a gentle grade until it turns east, where it begins to offer panoramic views of San Bernardino. Hence, this portion of Route 18 is known as the Rim of the World Highway. After meeting State Route 138 at Mount Andreson Junction south of Crestline, the expressway reverts to a two-lane mountain road. It meets two other highways, State Route 189 just east of Arrowhead Highlands and State Route 173 in Lake Arrowhead, before running over State Route 330 in Running Springs. SR 18 continues through several valleys and near ski resorts before reaching a summit. At that point, Route 18 again runs along a lengthy mountain ridge, offering more spectacular scenery at an even higher elevation. At its west junction with State Route 38 near the west corner of Big Bear Lake, Route 18 jogs across a dam and travels along the south shore of Big Bear Lake. After going through the City of Big Bear Lake, it overlaps with SR 38 and moves from the south to the north side of Bear Valley east of both Big Bear Lake and the Big Bear City airport before it descends from the mountains to the desert on the northerly side of the mountains, first heading northeast, briefly north, and then northwest.

SR 18 at this point follows the cities on the north face of the San Bernardino Mountains in the Mojave Desert: In Lucerne Valley, it turns west for 21 miles with SR 247 1/8th of a mile north of the bend. It goes past the east terminus of Bear Valley Road (a major Victor Valley area cutoff) outside of Apple Valley town limits as it becomes an expressway (Happy Trails Highway, given for the High Desert's residency and final resting place of the legendary singing cowboy, Roy Rogers) through Apple Valley and Victorville. It joins with Interstate 15 inside of Victorville for a few miles to the southeast and south before taking off west across the desert, reducing into a two-lane highway again and meeting U.S. Route 395 at the Victorville–Adelanto border, crosses into Los Angeles County as the beginning of county-named Pearblossom Highway, and ending at State Route 138 east of Llano.

SR 18 thus takes an unusual path in the shape of a question mark. From SR 138 in Llano to I-15 in Victorville, it is signed as east-west. East of the 15, cardinal descriptions are not posted below the route markers, since it does not clearly go either east-west or north–south. Also notable is that State Route 18 and 138 cover each other in opposing termini, as SR 138 ends at its southmost point in Crestline with SR 18, while SR 18's northwest most endpoint is in Llano with SR 138.

SR 18 is part of the California Freeway and Expressway System, and in Apple Valley and west of I-15 are part of the National Highway System, a network of highways that are considered essential to the country's economy, defense, and mobility by the Federal Highway Administration. SR 18 is eligible to be included in the State Scenic Highway System, but it is not officially designated as a scenic highway by the California Department of Transportation.

SR 18 from SR 138 at Crestline to SR 38 at the westernmost point of Big Bear Lake, and the SR 18/38 overlap in the City of Big Bear Lake, are designated as part of the Rim of the World Scenic Byway, a National Forest Scenic Byway.

== History ==
Much of SR 18 has been signed since 1917, with the portion north of Big Bear Lake dating from 1933. Since 1963, State Route 18 has generally been legislatively defined as from Interstate 10 to State Route 138 going through San Bernardino through Waterman Canyon and near Big Bear Lake and Victorville. However, the section from Interstate 10 to present-day State Route 210 was never built, although it was designated as Legislative Route 26 in 1916 and Legislative Route 275 in 1959. In 1944, prior to the construction of I-10, the southern terminus of SR 18 began at the intersection of E Street and Colton Avenue. It proceeded northward along E Street to Highland Avenue, turned eastward to Sierra Avenue, and northward into the foothills. In 1964, SR 18 was rerouted from the northern side of Big Bear Lake to the southern side along the former routing of SR 38 and lost its Legislative Route 43 designation. In 1984, the portion of SR 18 running concurrently with Interstate 15 in Victorville was removed from the legislative definition. In 1991, SR 18 was rerouted to Lakeview Drive and out of the downtown area of Big Bear Lake city proper, and this is now a business route of SR 18.

Before 1964, SR 18 continued south of San Bernardino to Lakewood, via La Cadena Drive, Magnolia Avenue, 6th Street, Pomona-Rincon Road, Santa Ana Canyon Road, Lincoln Avenue, Carson Street and Lakewood Boulevard. When freeways were constructed, SR 18 was routed on what is now Interstate 215 and State Route 91 as well as Lakewood Boulevard. SR 18 then ran concurrently with State Route 19 to the western terminus of U.S. Route 6 in Long Beach.

== Major intersections ==
Except where prefixed with a letter, postmiles were measured on the road as it was in 1964, based on the alignment that existed at the time, and do not necessarily reflect current mileage. Postmile prefixes include: R reflecting a realignment in the route since then, M indicating a second realignment, L referring to an overlap due to a correction or change, and T indicating postmiles classified as temporary. Segments that remain unconstructed or have been relinquished to local control may be omitted. The numbers reset at county lines; the start and end postmiles in each county are given in the county column.

County	Location	Postmile	Exit	Destinations	Notes
San Bernardino; SBD T6.18-115.91	San Bernardino	T6.18		Waterman Avenue	Continuation beyond SR 210
San Bernardino; SBD T6.18-115.91	San Bernardino	T6.18		SR 210 (Foothill Freeway) to I-215 – Redlands, Pasadena, Los Angeles, Riverside	Interchange; clockwise end of SR 18; former SR 30; future I-210; SR 210 exit 76
San Bernardino; SBD T6.18-115.91	San Bernardino	T8.26		SR 18 Bus. south (Sierra Way)	Interchange; southbound exit only
San Bernardino; SBD T6.18-115.91	San Bernardino	R13.28		Waterman Canyon Road	Interchange
San Bernardino; SBD T6.18-115.91		R17.73		SR 138 west – Crestline	Interchange; eastern terminus of SR 138
San Bernardino; SBD T6.18-115.91		20.61		SR 189 / Lake Gregory Drive – Lake Gregory, Twin Peaks	Western terminus of SR 189
San Bernardino; SBD T6.18-115.91		24.71		SR 173 – Lake Arrowhead	Eastern terminus of SR 173
San Bernardino; SBD T6.18-115.91	Running Springs	31.90		SR 330 south (City Creek Road) – San Bernardino	Interchange; northern terminus of SR 330; former SR 30
San Bernardino; SBD T6.18-115.91	Big Bear Dam	44.32		SR 38 west (North Shore Drive) – Fawnskin, Big Bear City	Eastern terminus of SR 38
San Bernardino; SBD T6.18-115.91	Big Bear Lake			SR 18 Bus. north (Village Drive) / Paine Road	
San Bernardino; SBD T6.18-115.91	Big Bear Lake	49.11		SR 18 Bus. south (Pine Knot Avenue)	
San Bernardino; SBD T6.18-115.91	Big Bear City	53.92		SR 38 west (Big Bear Boulevard) / Green Way Drive – Redlands	South end of SR 38 overlap
San Bernardino; SBD T6.18-115.91	Big Bear City	54.54		SR 38 east (North Shore Drive) / Green Way Drive – Fawnskin	North end of SR 38 overlap
San Bernardino; SBD T6.18-115.91	Lucerne Valley			Barstow Road to SR 247 – Barstow	
San Bernardino; SBD T6.18-115.91	Lucerne Valley			Old Woman Springs Road to SR 247 – Landers, Yucca Valley	
San Bernardino; SBD T6.18-115.91	Victorville	95.79		I-15 BL south (7th Street)	South end of I-15 Bus. overlap; former US 66 west / US 91 south
San Bernardino; SBD T6.18-115.91	Victorville	96.57 40.51 (Note: Indicates that the postmile represents the distance along I-15 rather than SR 18.)		I-15 north (Mojave Freeway) / D Street – Barstow	Interchange; south end of I-15 overlap; north end of I-15 Bus. overlap; I-15 exit 153B; D Street is former US 66 east / US 91 north
San Bernardino; SBD T6.18-115.91	Victorville	42.03	151B (Note: Exit numbers follow I-15 rather than SR 18.)	Mojave Drive	
San Bernardino; SBD T6.18-115.91	Victorville	41.43	151A	Roy Rogers Drive	
San Bernardino; SBD T6.18-115.91	Victorville	43.49 R96.58		I-15 south (Mojave Freeway) / 7th Street (I-15 Bus. north) – San Bernardino	Interchange; north end of I-15 overlap; I-15 exit 150
San Bernardino; SBD T6.18-115.91	Victorville–Adelanto line	100.95		US 395 – Adelanto, San Bernardino	
Los Angeles; LA 0.00-4.50	Llano	4.50		SR 138 (Pearblossom Highway / Antelope Highway) – San Bernardino, Palmdale, Lancaster	Counterclockwise end of SR 18
1.000 mi = 1.609 km; 1.000 km = 0.621 mi: Concurrency terminus; Incomplete access

== Business loop ==
State Route 18 Business
- Location: Big Bear Lake
- Length: 0.6 mi (970 m)

State Route 18 Business (SR 18 Bus.) is a short business route of California State Route 18 in Big Bear Lake. It provides access to The Village, Big Bear Lake's downtown, as Village Drive and Pine Knot Avenue. It follows the former routing of its parent route.

Major intersections

The entire route is in Big Bear Lake, San Bernardino County.

mi	km	Destinations	Notes
0.0	0.0	SR 18 (Big Bear Boulevard) / Paine Road	Southern terminus
0.3	0.48	Village Drive east / Pine Knot Avenue south	
0.6	0.97	SR 18 (Big Bear Boulevard)	Northern terminus
0.6	0.97	Pine Knot Avenue north	Continuation beyond SR 18
1.000 mi = 1.609 km; 1.000 km = 0.621 mi
