= KOLA =

- San Bernardino, California; United States
- Broadcast area: Riverside-San Bernardino-Inland Empire
- Frequency: 99.9 MHz
- Branding: KOLA 99.9

Programming
- Format: Classic hits
- Affiliations: Premiere Networks

Ownership
- Owner: Anaheim Broadcasting Corp.
- Sister stations: KCAL-FM

History
- First air date: June 15, 1959 (as KFMW)
- Former call signs: KFMW (1959–1969)
- Call sign meaning: Sounds like "Cola"

Technical information
- Licensing authority: FCC
- Facility ID: 55240
- Class: B
- ERP: 29,500 watts
- HAAT: 507 meters (1,663 ft)
- Transmitter coordinates: 33°57′59.1″N 117°17′19.2″W

Links
- Public license information: Public file; LMS
- Webcast: Listen live; Listen live
- Website: kolafm.com

KOLA (99.9 FM) is a commercial radio station licensed to San Bernardino, California, United States, and broadcasting to the Riverside-San Bernardino-Inland Empire market. It is owned by the Anaheim Broadcasting Corporation through Inland Empire Broadcasting and it airs a classic hits format. Its studios are on Orange Tree Lane in Redlands, California.

KOLA is considered a "superpower" FM station. The transmitter is on Box Spring Mountain Road amid other FM and TV towers for Inland Empire stations.

== History ==
The station first signed on the air on June 15, 1959. The station's original call sign was KFMW. The transmitter was located on Box Springs Mountain southeast of Riverside.

The format was a mix of easy listening, middle of the road (MOR) and beautiful music. Rogan Jones served as the original general manager.

Frederick Coté and Chester Coleman bought the station in 1965. Coté bought out Coleman's half-interest at the end of 1969. The callsign was changed to KOLA.

The format flipped to Top 40, concentrating on rhythmic hits. In the winter of 1970–71, KOLA moved its studios to the Mission Inn in downtown Riverside. In 1980, the station switched to Album Rock with Ted Ziegenbusch as the programming consultant through 1987. In 1987 the station switched back to Top 40 music.

In the 1990s KOLA changed its format to Oldies from the 1950s, '60s and '70s. Over time, the 1950s songs were deleted and 1980s songs were added. Around 2007, most of the 1960s hits were dropped as the station concentrated on the hits of the 1970s and 1980s. By spring of 2013, KOLA had dropped all the 1960s oldies and switched to a 1970s-80s-90s Classic Hits format. In 2018, KOLA dropped most of the 1970s hits and began adding songs from the early 2000s. By 2025, all 1970s songs (except for a few major artists like Fleetwood Mac and Bee Gees) were dropped entirely and the station began adding occasional early 2010s songs.

KOLA continues to broadcast from the same tower and power as was stated on its original license from 1959 as KFMW.
