= KCAL-FM =

Radio station in Redlands, California

Coordinates: 34.198°N 117.287°W

- Redlands, California; United States
- Broadcast area: Inland Empire
- Frequency: 96.7 MHz
- Branding: 96.7 KCAL Rocks

Programming
- Language: English
- Format: Classic rock

Ownership
- Owner: Anaheim Broadcasting; (SBR Broadcasting Corporation)
- Sister stations: KOLA

History
- First air date: 1965; 61 years ago
- Call sign meaning: California

Technical information
- Licensing authority: FCC
- Facility ID: 59272
- Class: A
- ERP: 1,750 watts
- HAAT: 115 meters (377 ft)
- Repeater: 96.7 KCAL-FM1 (Twin Peaks)

Links
- Public license information: Public file; LMS
- Webcast: Listen live
- Website: www.kcalfm.com

KCAL-FM (96.7 FM) is a commercial radio station licensed to Redlands, California, and broadcasting to the Inland Empire. The station is owned by Anaheim Broadcasting and airs a classic rock format. The station's studios are on Orange Tree Lane in Redlands.

KCAL-FM is a Class A station. Its transmitter site is off Cloudland Truck Trail near Lake Arrowhead in the San Bernardino Mountains. Programming is simulcast on KCAL-FM1, a booster station in Twin Peaks.

== History ==
=== Early years ===
KCAL-FM first signed on the air in 1965. It had a middle of the road (MOR) format. Originally owned by Southwest Broadcasting Company, it was the sister station of KCAL (1410 AM).

In 1969, KCAL-FM adopted a dayparted rock format, playing soft rock during daytime hours and harder album rock at night. This hybrid format, known as "The Rock Spectrum", was unique in the Inland Empire radio market. A prominent feature on KCAL-FM was a weekly program called Album Premiere, during which a newly released album was played Monday and Tuesday evenings – one side each evening. This eventually led to a switch to album-oriented rock (AOR) full-time in 1978.

=== Changes in ownership ===
In October 1986, Southwest Broadcasting sold KCAL-FM to San Bernardino Broadcasting, headed by Tim Sullivan, for $4 million; KCAL (AM) remained with Southwest. On January 1, 1987, control of the station passed to Anaheim Broadcasting, also led by Sullivan; that March, the new owner installed former KGGI program director Cliff Roberts in the same position at KCAL-FM.

During the 1990s, KCAL-FM adjusted its AOR format to active rock. The station mixes new and recent rock releases with hard-edged classic rock titles, going back as far as the early Rolling Stones and Steppenwolf.

In the late 1990s, the station began hosting a listener appreciation party known as the "KCAL Kegger". Held in the station's parking lot in Redlands three times a year, each party features live rock bands, local vendors, refreshments, and a beer garden; the station donated proceeds from beer sales to local charities. Each year's final Kegger includes a bikini pageant called "Miss KCAL".

=== Tower topples ===
On December 31, 2014, high winds in the San Bernardino Mountains toppled KCAL-FM's transmission tower, knocking the station off the air. The station resumed broadcasting two days later on the evening of January 2, 2015. Engineers were able to attach the station's transmission equipment to KFRG's tower temporarily.

In January 2018, longtime KCAL-FM on-air personalities Michael "Stu-Man" Stewart, "Tiffany" Angelo, and James "Jimbo" Smith – the morning drive hosts collectively known as "STJ", and previously known as "The Morning Stiffy" — were dismissed from the station due to budget cuts. Morning show producer Steven Kono was also let go. Patrick Tish took over morning host duties.

=== Classic rock ===
On July 31, 2026, the entire airstaff was dismissed, with the station converted to an automated and personality-free classic rock station the day after.
