= KCAL (AM) =

Radio station in Redlands, California

- Redlands, California; United States
- Frequency: 1410 kHz
- Branding: La Mexicana 1410

Programming
- Format: Classic regional Mexican

Ownership
- Owner: Lazer Media; (Lazer Licenses, LLC)
- Sister stations: KAEH, KXSB, KXRS

History
- First air date: April 2, 1954
- Call sign meaning: California

Technical information
- Licensing authority: FCC
- Facility ID: 55416
- Class: B
- Power: 2,000 watts (day); 4,000 watts (night)
- Transmitter coordinates: 34°6′39″N 117°9′14.1″W

Links
- Public license information: Public file; LMS
- Webcast: Listen live
- Website: www.lamexicanaradio.net/sanbernardino

KCAL (1410 kHz) is a commercial AM radio station licensed to Redlands, California, and serving the Riverside-San Bernardino-Inland Empire radio market. It is owned by Lazer Media, with studios and offices in San Bernardino. Lazer owns a number of small Spanish language outlets throughout Southern California. There is also a KCAL-FM at 96.7 MHz and KCAL-TV 9, but they are not connected with AM 1410 KCAL.

Although most of its programming is in Spanish as "La Mexicana," KCAL does air the games of the Rancho Cucamonga Quakes of the California League (Minor League Baseball) in English. The rest of KCAL's schedule consists of Spanish-language programming, with a Classic Regional Mexican radio format.

== History ==
The station signed on in April 1954 on 1410 AM. It added an FM station at 96.7 MHz in the 1970s. KCAL had a Top 40 format from the 1960s to the 1990s, and was the leading radio station in the Inland Empire in the 1970s and 1980s.

On October 28, 2015, KCAL was granted a Federal Communications Commission construction permit to change the community of license to Grand Terrace, decrease day power to 3,000 watts, decrease night power to 2,200 watts and move the transmitter site to a diplex at KKDD in San Bernardino. The construction permit expired unbuilt in 2018.
