= KAEH =

Radio station in Beaumont, California

Coordinates: 33.9475°N 116.9850°W

- Beaumont, California; United States
- Broadcast area: East Riverside County, California
- Frequency: 100.9 MHz
- Branding: La Mejor 100.9 FM

Programming
- Format: Spanish Adult Hits

Ownership
- Owner: Lazer Media; (Lazer Licenses, LLC)
- Sister stations: KXRS, KXSB, KCAL-AM

History
- First air date: 1996

Technical information
- Licensing authority: FCC
- Facility ID: 3727
- Class: A
- ERP: 1,500 watts
- HAAT: 146 meters

Links
- Public license information: Public file; LMS
- Website: https://lamejornetwork.com/riverside/

KAEH (100.9 FM) is a commercial radio station licensed in Beaumont, California, with studios located on South E Street in San Bernardino, California, broadcasting to the Riverside area. KAEH airs a Spanish-language Adult Hits music format branded as "La Mejor." It is simulcast on KXSB, which serves the San Bernardino area.
