= Angelus Oaks, California =

Unincorporated community in California, United States

- Unincorporated community
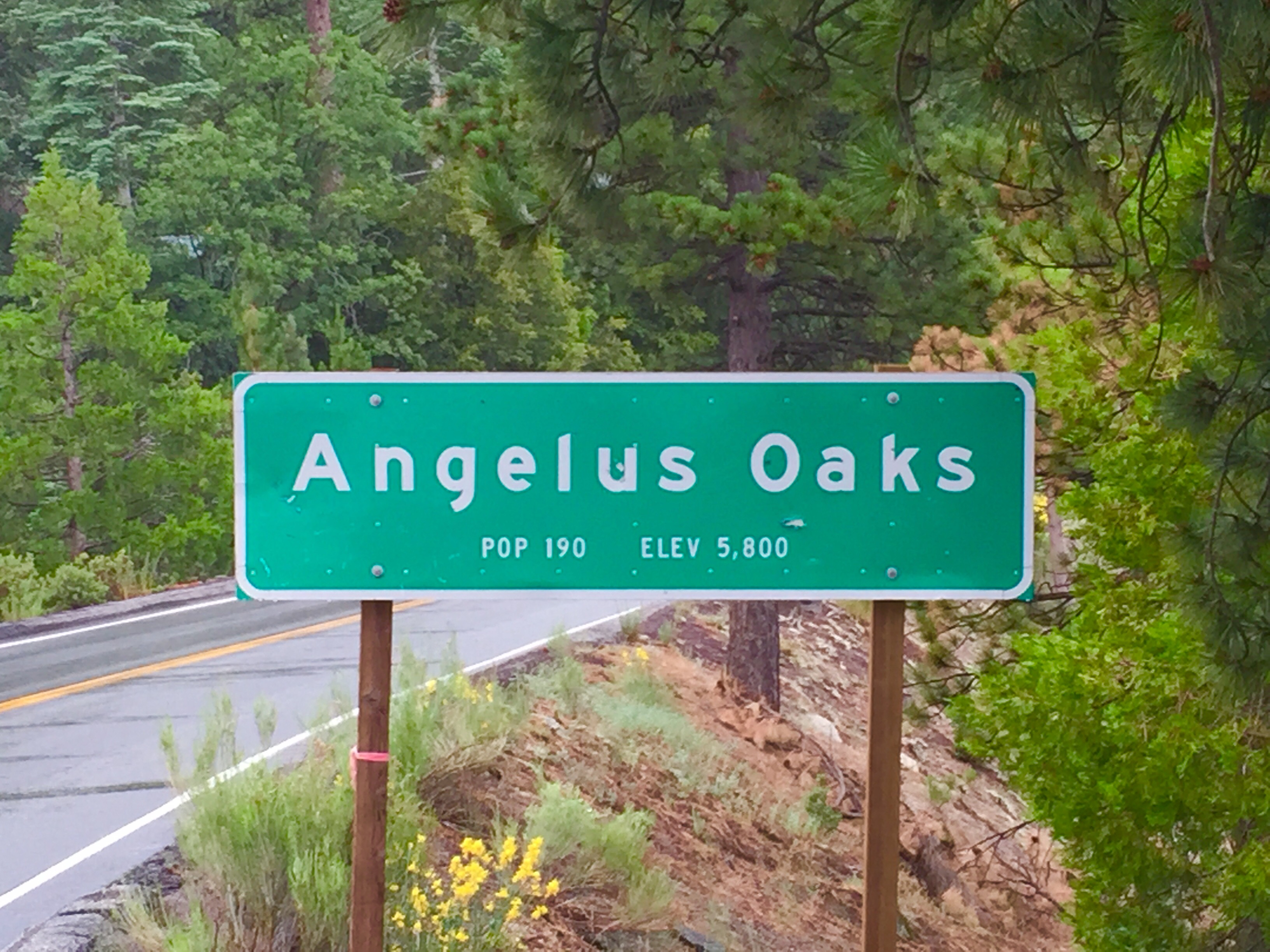

- Location within the state of California Angelus Oaks, California (the United States)
- Coordinates: 34°8′45″N 116°58′57″W
- Country: United States
- State: California
- County: San Bernardino

Area
  - Total: 0.500 sq mi (1.295 km^{2})
- Elevation: 5,800 ft (1,800 m)

Population (2010)
  - Total: 312
  - Density: 624/sq mi (241/km^{2})
- Time zone: UTC−8 (Pacific (PST))
  - Summer (DST): UTC−7 (PDT)
- ZIP Codes: 92305

Angelus Oaks is an unincorporated community in San Bernardino County, California, United States, and has a population of 535 as of the 2010 U.S. Census, up from an estimated population of 312 in 2000. It is surrounded by the San Bernardino National Forest and located east of San Bernardino on California State Route 38.

== History ==
Angelus Oaks was initially called Camp Angelus. In 1849 there was a big gold strike in Holcomb Valley, north of Bear Valley and near the town that was later to become Big Bear. The only way to get supplies in and the gold out was by mule trains. The mule train traveled up the Santa Ana River Canyon, stopping overnight in Seven Oaks and then took a switch back trail (Clark's Grade; still visible on the mountain across from the Angelus Oaks Lodge) up to the gold fields. Eventually, a wagon road was built to replace the mule skinner trail. The "Lower Control Road" started at Mountain Home Village, in Mill Creek Canyon, and ended in Camp Angelus, at the Lodge. "Middle Control Road" started just east of the Lodge and meandered down to Seven Oaks. The final control road, 'Clark's Grade', went up and over the north side of the Santa Ana Canyon and into Bear Valley.

Beginning in the late 1800s and early 1900s, the stagecoach, using the old wagon road, would bring passengers and mail from Redlands up Mill Creek, then Mountain Home Creek (Lower Control Road), through Camp Angelus, on to Seven Oaks via Middle Control Road and then up the back side of the mountain to Big Bear. The now Angelus Oaks Lodge was first built as a stagecoach stop for changing horses at the top of the climb and for serving up sandwiches to passengers. It also served as a small grocery store for the local community. The original wagon road is the small road that now runs along the front of the Lodge and crosses over to the current chain up turn-out (Middle Control Road).

The original school was a log cabin on a hill located behind and rented from Glen Lodge. This lodge had a full restaurant, bar, gas and repair station, grocery store, hotel, cabins, and a dance hall with a large fireplace. In 1953 the first teacher, originally from South Dakota and a graduate of USC, was Orville Young. He lived with his family in Camp Angelus and taught the community children from five to 13 years of age at Camp Angelus Elementary. In 1956 the natural wood clad (later painted red) one-room school-house serving grades one through seven was built, and closed permanently in 2004. Glen Lodge burned down in the late Sixties.

In the 1970s, when the postal service decided to combine the two small post offices of Camp Angelus and Seven Oaks, closing the Seven Oaks location, they renamed the remaining office "Angelus Oaks". That name stuck with the town.

In 1987, the lodge was purchased by a couple living at that time in Long Beach, California. The lodge and cabins were restored over a two-year period and heaters and showers were added to the cabins. As of January 2015, eight of the original 12 cabins have been completely restored, and the Lodge is open for viewing. The cabins are available to rent on a nightly basis and are operated under a special use permit provided by the USDA Forest Service.

On February 12, 2013, in a rural area east of Angelus Oaks, the search for Christopher Dorner ended after a standoff with the San Bernardino County Sheriff's Department. He was the primary suspect in a series of shootings.

== Present day ==
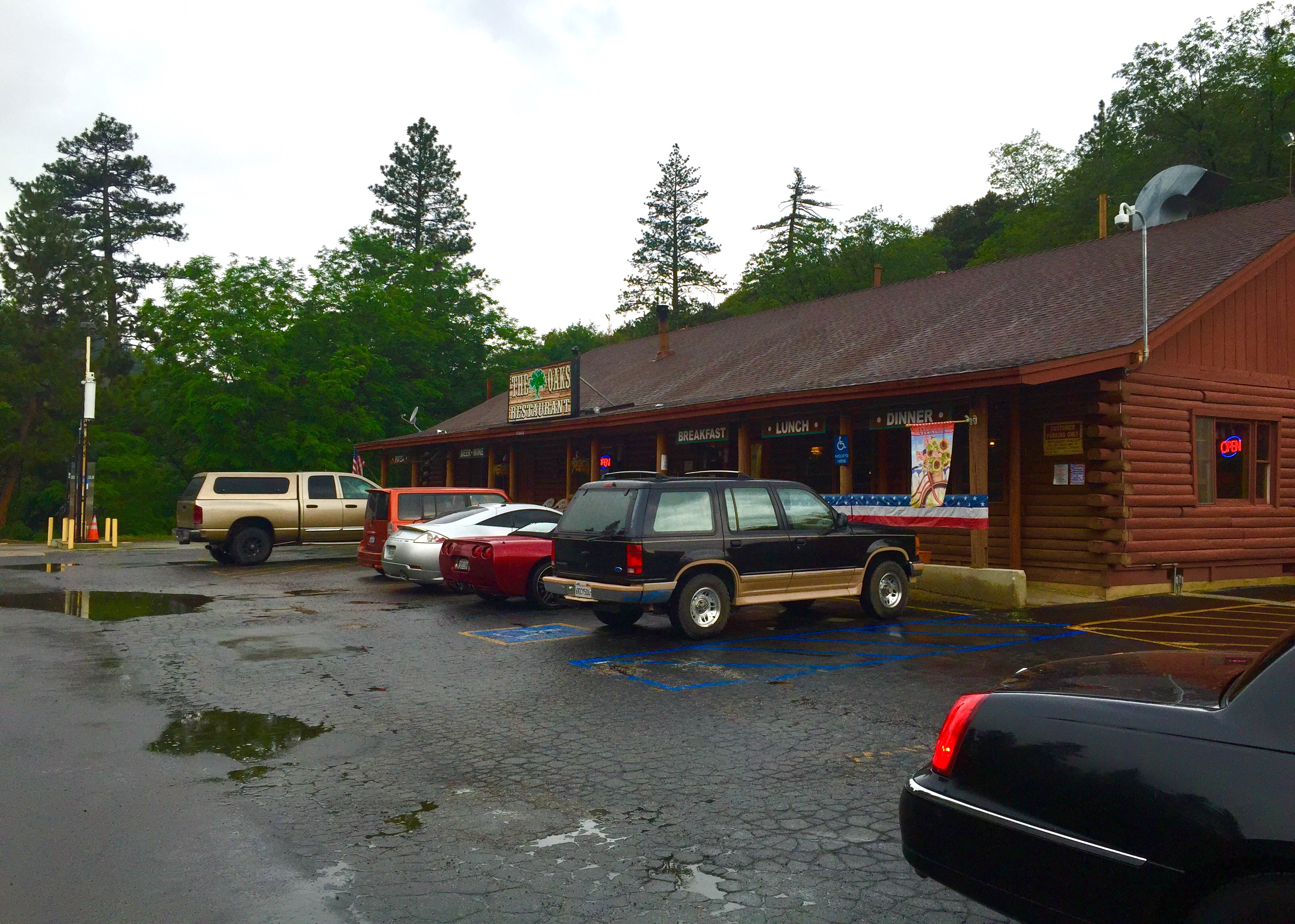
The Oaks Restaurant, the only restaurant in Angelus Oaks

Its downtown consists of a general store, a restaurant, a post office (ZIP Code 92305) and a real estate office. A San Bernardino County Fire Station (Station 98) is also downtown, and a San Bernardino County Sheriff's Department Resident Deputy (one of only three in the entire County) lives nearby. The State of California's Department of Transportation (CalTrans) and the United States Forest Service also have a presence in downtown Angelus Oaks. Two private water companies service the residents of Angelus Oaks. Within the town lies the historical Angelus Oaks Lodge, which originally served as a stagecoach stop for passengers traveling up the mountain to Big Bear, and is now available for overnight visitors.

Angelus Oaks has become popular to bicyclists due to its proximity to the Santa Ana River Trail (S.A.R.T.) which is known for its grandeur and challenge. For hikers, Angelus Oaks includes the San Bernardino Peak Hiking Trail (1W07) and the Vivian Creek Trail. There are other less vigorous trails situated throughout the San Gorgonio Wilderness. The Angelus Oaks Lodge offers an overnight and staging area for bikers and hikers wishing to start in the early morning.

A few miles past Angelus Oaks, in the Barton Flats area, there are multiple public Forest Service campsites and group camps run by various churches and non-profit organizations, including YMCA and Jewish Community Center of Orange County. The two largest and most active camps are the Boy Scout Camp Tahquitz owned by the Long Beach Boy Scouts (it was developed from a very private summer tent camp with one snack store to one serving thousands of Scouts year round with a mess hall, clinic, garage/fire station, swimming and fishing lake, camp offices, and rangers' quarters developed, built, and maintained under the watchful eye of the Camp Ranger, Glen McIntosh, from 1957 until his death in 1981), and Camp Cedar Falls, 3 miles (5 km) past Angelus Oaks on Highway 38 run by the Seventh-day Adventist Church. Jenks Lake Day Use Area hosts fishing and waterfront activities, including kayaking and canoeing; swimming is not allowed. There are also public restrooms, and many tables and grills for picnics.

== Climate ==
According to the Köppen Climate Classification system, Angelus Oaks, California has a warm-summer Mediterranean climate, abbreviated "Csb" on climate maps.

Climate data for Angelus Oaks, California
| Month | Jan | Feb | Mar | Apr | May | Jun | Jul | Aug | Sep | Oct | Nov | Dec | Year |
|---|---|---|---|---|---|---|---|---|---|---|---|---|---|
| Mean daily maximum °F (°C) | 49 (9) | 49 (9) | 53 (12) | 59 (15) | 66 (19) | 75 (24) | 81 (27) | 81 (27) | 76 (24) | 66 (19) | 57 (14) | 48 (9) | 63 (17) |
| Mean daily minimum °F (°C) | 28 (−2) | 28 (−2) | 31 (−1) | 34 (1) | 39 (4) | 48 (9) | 56 (13) | 56 (13) | 50 (10) | 41 (5) | 34 (1) | 28 (−2) | 39 (4) |
| Average precipitation inches (mm) | 4.9 (120) | 5.7 (140) | 3.9 (99) | 1.4 (36) | 0.8 (20) | 0.2 (5.1) | 0.5 (13) | 0.3 (7.6) | 0.4 (10) | 1.0 (25) | 1.6 (41) | 3.7 (94) | 24.4 (610.7) |
Source: Weatherbase

== See also ==
- Camp Tahquitz
