= Big Bear Lake, California =

City in California, United States

Big Bear Lake, California Yuhaviat
- City
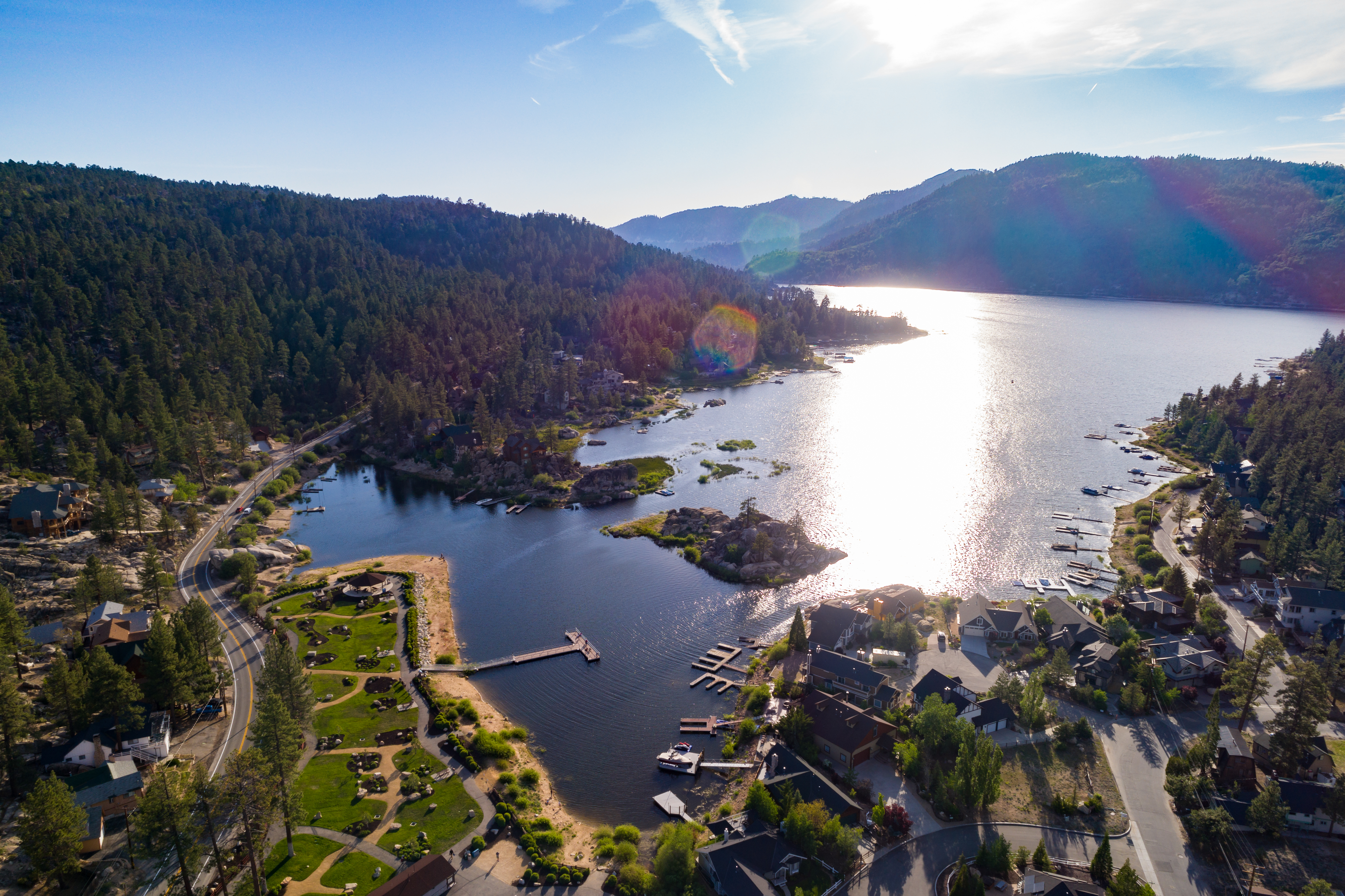
- Looking east at Big Bear Valley from Butler Peak lookout tower in the San Bernardino National Forest

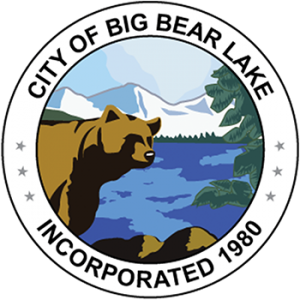
- Seal
- Interactive map of Big Bear Lake, California
- Location in the United States
- Coordinates: 34°14′38″N 116°54′41″W
- Country: United States
- State: California
- County: San Bernardino
- Incorporated: November 28, 1980
- Named for: Big Bear Lake

Government
  - Type: Council/Manager
  - Mayor: Randall Putz
  - City Manager: Erik Sund
  - Mayor Pro Tem: Kendi Segovia
  - City Council: Rick Herrick; Charles Hicks, Jr. Perri Melnick

Area
  - Total: 6.42 sq mi (16.64 km^{2})
  - Land: 6.24 sq mi (16.16 km^{2})
  - Water: 0.18 sq mi (0.47 km^{2}) 2.88%
- Elevation: 6,752 ft (2,058 m)

Population (2020)
  - Total: 5,046
  - Density: 808.5/sq mi (312.17/km^{2})
- Time zone: UTC−8 (PST)
  - Summer (DST): UTC−7 (PDT)
- ZIP Code: 92315
- Area code: 909
- FIPS code: 06-06434
- GNIS feature ID: 1652673
- Website: bigbearlake.gov

Big Bear Lake is a city in San Bernardino County, California, United States, located in the San Bernardino Mountains along the south shore of Big Bear Lake, and surrounded by the San Bernardino National Forest. The city is about 25 miles (40 km) northeast of the city of San Bernardino, and immediately west of the unincorporated town of Big Bear City. The population was approximately 5,046 at the 2020 census. However, as a popular year-round resort destination, the actual number of people staying in or visiting the greater Big Bear Valley area regularly surges to over 100,000 during many weekends of the year.

== History ==
Big Bear Lake was inhabited by the indigenous Serrano people for over 2,000 years before it was explored by Benjamin Wilson and his party. Once populated by only the natives and the grizzly bears, from which the area received its name, the population of the Big Bear Valley grew rapidly during the Southern California gold rush from 1861 to 1912. Grizzly bears were not found in the region after 1908. Black bears have been in the region since their introduction in 1933, and they are sometimes sighted in residential areas.

A trip to Big Bear Lake from San Bernardino took two days on horse-drawn coaches. Kirk Phillips was a local who took a trip to New York City and saw the world's first bus line. This inspired him to create the world's second bus line from San Bernardino to Big Bear Valley using white trucks with several rows of seats. This made it possible for the villages to grow and for Big Bear Lake to become the first mountain recreation area in Southern California.

Many people traveled to enjoy recreation on the lake. However, another major draw was the natural hot spring. Emile Jesserun bought 40 acres (16 ha) of land that included the hot spring and built the first major resort in Big Bear, the Pan Hot Springs Hotel, in 1921. This resort was followed with others that strove to be the best by creating a country club atmosphere, complete with the amenities required to lure the Hollywood celebrities of the time including Cecil B. DeMille, Shirley Temple, and Ginger Rogers. By 1924, Big Bear was populated with 44 resorts and a constant stream of vacationers. The Pan Hot Springs Hotel, like many of the other resorts and hotels in Big Bear, was extensively damaged by fire in 1933.

In 1933, the California Fish and Game Commission transported around 27 black bears from Yosemite National Park to Southern California, releasing them near Big Bear. Sightings of the newly released bears in cities stoked fear among residents. J. Dale Gentry, chairman of the Fish and Game Commission, resigned shortly after.

For Hollywood's film industry, the area has been a popular place for shooting on location since the silent era. In late November 1915, Universal Studios filmed there for its three-reel production of John o' the Mountains starring Sydney Ayres and Louella Maxam. The 1920 version of Last of the Mohicans was filmed there as well, as were some scenes for the 1936 film Daniel Boone, Gone with the Wind, 20th Century Fox's 1960 film North to Alaska, Disney's Old Yeller, the 1969 musical film Paint Your Wagon, the 1983 movie War Games, and the 1985 "dark comedy" Better Off Dead. Many television series have filmed sequences there too, including opening sequences in 1969 for the NBC children's program H.R. Pufnstuf.

Winter activities are also popular in Big Bear. The first ski jump in Big Bear was erected in 1929 and quickly claimed a world ski jump record. More jumps were built in Big Bear Lake and the Viking Ski Club of Los Angeles began to use them for competition and events. The move to a winter resort town was solidified in 1952 when Tommy Tyndall opened a resort in Big Bear Lake, now known as Snow Summit. In some winters the area gets little snow, but snow machines keep the resorts in business.

In the summer of 1968, Caltech began construction of Big Bear Solar Observatory (BBSO) located on the north shore of Big Bear Lake. Due to extensive rain and snow, the lake rose several feet and BBSO was surrounded by water at the time construction was completed using makeshift barges in May 1970. BBSO, now operated by the New Jersey Institute of Technology, is still a major Big Bear Lake landmark connected to the north shore by a dirt and rock causeway.

Since 1970, Big Bear Lake has held an annual Oktoberfest. The Big Bear Lake Oktoberfest sports the highest beer garden, by elevation, in the United States. Big Bear Lake was incorporated as a city on November 28, 1980.

During the 1990s, the city became famous as a training spot for boxing champions. Oscar De La Hoya, Mike Tyson, Fernando Vargas, Gennady Golovkin, and Shane Mosley are among the famous boxers who have trained at Big Bear.

In February 2013, a major manhunt occurred in the Big Bear Lake area to find Christopher Dorner, who by that point had killed three people. A standoff ended in nearby Angelus Oaks.

== Geography ==
According to the United States Census Bureau, the city has a total area of 6.5 square miles (17 km^{2}), 6.3 square miles (16 km^{2}) of which is land and 0.2 square miles (0.52 km^{2}) of which (2.88%) is water. It is located 25 miles (40 km) northeast of the city of San Bernardino, and immediately west of Big Bear City.

Big Bear Lake is at an official elevation of 6,752 ft (2,058 m) above sea level.

The California Office of Environmental Health Hazard Assessment has issued a safety advisory for any fish caught in Big Bear Lake due to elevated levels of mercury and PCBs.

== Natural environment ==
=== Wildlife and habitats ===
San Bernardino Forest surrounds the Big Bear Lake area, which is full of several types of natural habitats, some of which are mixed conifer forests and oak woodlands. These habitats support different types of wildlife. American black bears are also among the different mammals found in the national forest, while some birds such as bald eagles and peregrine falcons use habitats that surround the mountain region.

=== Lake ecology ===
In the late 1960s, there were studies conducted on Big Bear Lake that showed the lake's water conditions changed throughout the course of the year. Researchers observed and learned that the water's temperatures and oxygen levels fluctuate depending on the season. Over the summer, the water's oxygen levels were low, close to the bottom of the lake. Studies also found that there was a seasonal increase in phytoplankton, which are microscopic organisms that live in water. These studies helped explain the lake's aquatic environment and its changes throughout the year.

=== Environmental changes ===
Big Bear Lake's water levels have changed over time. According to the Big Bear Municipal Water District, the lake loses its water through evaporation, with about an average of four feet of annual loss. Historical records show that the lake was full in January of 2016, but was ten feet below full by December of 2020. The records show how much the lake's water levels change over many years.

=== Climate ===
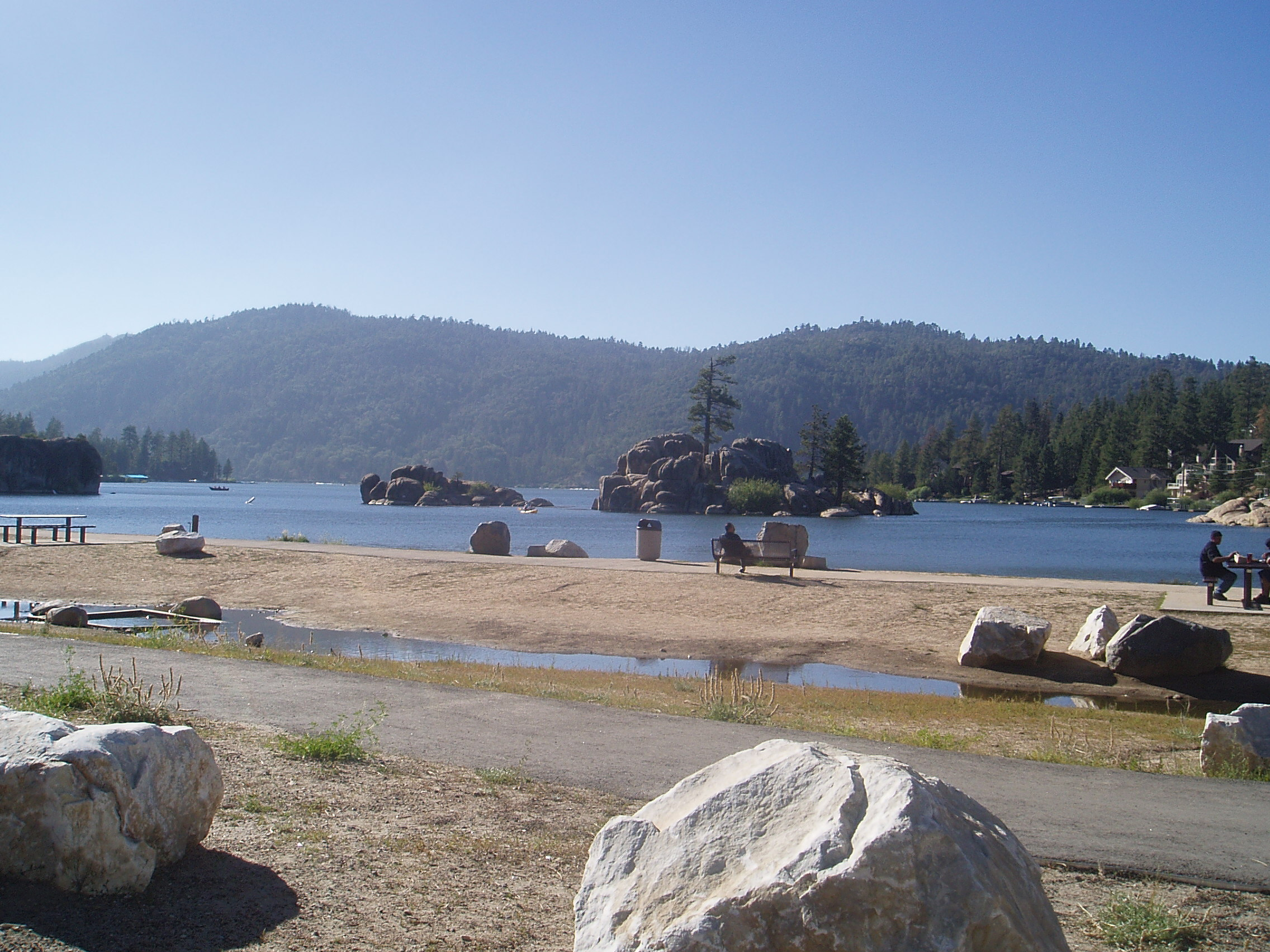
View from Boulder Bay Park

According to the National Weather Service, the warmest month at Big Bear is July, with a daily average temperature of 65.1 °F (18.4 °C). The coolest month is February, with a daily average temperature of 34.7 °F (1.5 °C). (January and December are nearly tied, at 34.8 °F; 1.6 °C.) There are an average of 1.3 days each year with highs of 90 °F (32 °C) or higher. Freezing temperatures have occurred in every month and occur on an average of 176.2 days each year, on average from September 24 to June 4. With a period of record dating back to only 1960, the highest temperature recorded was 98 °F (37 °C), recorded on June 30, 1994, while the lowest was −15 °F (−26 °C) on November 19, 1964.

Due to the 6,750 feet (2,060 m) elevation of the weather station, precipitation is greater than in the lowlands of southern California, averaging 19.98 in (507 mm) a year. The maximum 24-hour precipitation was 9.43 in (240 mm) on December 6, 1966. Measurable precipitation normally occurs 43.3 days a year. Mountain thunderstorms can produce heavy rainfall, even in midsummer (when most southern California lowland locations are quite dry). Under the Köppen climate classification, Big Bear Lake has a warm-summer Mediterranean climate (Csb) bordering a humid continental climate (Dsb); it lies within USDA plant hardiness zone 7a. Big Bear Lake is the highest and coldest incorporated city in southern California.

In contrast to most of southern California, the Big Bear Lake region normally receives significant winter snow because of its high elevation. Snowfall, as measured at lake level, averages 58.6 in (149 cm) per season; upwards of 100 in (250 cm) can accumulate on the forested ridges bordering the lake, at elevations above 8,000 ft (2,400 m). In February 1990, 59.5 in (151 cm) of snow were recorded. The most snow in 24 hours was 27.0 in (69 cm) on March 27, 1991. The greatest snow depth was 58 in (150 cm) on February 3, 1979. Snow has fallen in every month except July and August. There are normally 16 days each year with measurable snow of 0.1 in (0.25 cm) or more.

Climate data for Big Bear Lake, California, (1991–2020 normals, extremes 1914–present)
Month	Jan	Feb	Mar	Apr	May	Jun	Jul	Aug	Sep	Oct	Nov	Dec	Year
Record high °F (°C)	71 (22)	72 (22)	80 (27)	82 (28)	87 (31)	98 (37)	94 (34)	93 (34)	90 (32)	85 (29)	74 (23)	72 (22)	98 (37)
Mean maximum °F (°C)	60.1 (15.6)	60.3 (15.7)	65.1 (18.4)	72.2 (22.3)	78.4 (25.8)	85.8 (29.9)	88.7 (31.5)	86.5 (30.3)	82.1 (27.8)	75.5 (24.2)	68.3 (20.2)	61.8 (16.6)	89.8 (32.1)
Mean daily maximum °F (°C)	46.1 (7.8)	45.7 (7.6)	51.2 (10.7)	57.3 (14.1)	65.8 (18.8)	75.1 (23.9)	79.7 (26.5)	78.7 (25.9)	73.0 (22.8)	63.4 (17.4)	53.5 (11.9)	46.2 (7.9)	61.3 (16.3)
Daily mean °F (°C)	34.3 (1.3)	34.3 (1.3)	38.9 (3.8)	44.1 (6.7)	51.3 (10.7)	59.3 (15.2)	65.1 (18.4)	64.1 (17.8)	58.5 (14.7)	49.0 (9.4)	40.4 (4.7)	34.3 (1.3)	47.8 (8.8)
Mean daily minimum °F (°C)	22.7 (−5.2)	22.9 (−5.1)	26.5 (−3.1)	30.8 (−0.7)	36.8 (2.7)	43.5 (6.4)	50.5 (10.3)	49.5 (9.7)	44.0 (6.7)	34.6 (1.4)	27.4 (−2.6)	22.6 (−5.2)	34.3 (1.3)
Mean minimum °F (°C)	8.8 (−12.9)	9.8 (−12.3)	14.1 (−9.9)	20.1 (−6.6)	27.0 (−2.8)	33.4 (0.8)	40.8 (4.9)	40.0 (4.4)	32.5 (0.3)	24.5 (−4.2)	15.4 (−9.2)	10.1 (−12.2)	4.9 (−15.1)
Record low °F (°C)	−25 (−32)	−16 (−27)	−12 (−24)	−7 (−22)	15 (−9)	22 (−6)	28 (−2)	28 (−2)	19 (−7)	10 (−12)	−15 (−26)	−14 (−26)	−25 (−32)
Average precipitation inches (mm)	4.51 (115)	4.39 (112)	2.37 (60)	0.78 (20)	0.42 (11)	0.15 (3.8)	0.69 (18)	0.82 (21)	0.40 (10)	0.79 (20)	1.35 (34)	3.31 (84)	19.98 (508.8)
Average snowfall inches (cm)	13.4 (34)	14.3 (36)	11.7 (30)	3.0 (7.6)	0.6 (1.5)	0.0 (0.0)	0.0 (0.0)	0.0 (0.0)	0.0 (0.0)	1.2 (3.0)	3.4 (8.6)	11.0 (28)	58.6 (148.7)
Average precipitation days (≥ 0.01 in)	6.6	6.8	5.5	3.7	2.0	0.7	2.6	2.8	2.0	2.2	2.9	5.5	43.3
Average snowy days (≥ 0.1 in)	3.5	3.5	2.7	1.2	0.3	0.1	0.0	0.0	0.0	0.3	1.1	3.3	16.0
Source: NOAA

== Demographics ==
Historical population
Census	Pop.	Note	%±
1990	5,351		—
2000	5,438		1.6%
2010	5,019		−7.7%
2020	5,046		0.5%
2024 (est.)	5,044	▼	0.0%
U.S. Decennial Census

=== Racial and ethnic composition ===
Big Bear Lake city, California – Racial and ethnic composition Note: the US Census treats Hispanic/Latino as an ethnic category. This table excludes Latinos from the racial categories and assigns them to a separate category. Hispanics/Latinos may be of any race.
Race / Ethnicity (NH = Non-Hispanic)	Pop 2000	Pop 2010	Pop 2020	% 2000	% 2010	% 2020
White alone (NH)	4,433	3,677	3,401	81.52%	73.26%	67.40%
Black or African American alone (NH)	37	21	46	0.68%	0.42%	0.91%
Native American or Alaska Native alone (NH)	37	37	21	0.68%	0.74%	0.42%
Asian alone (NH)	41	72	105	0.75%	1.43%	2.08%
Native Hawaiian or Pacific Islander alone (NH)	2	10	6	0.04%	0.20%	0.12%
Other race alone (NH)	10	9	38	0.18%	0.18%	0.75%
Mixed race or Multiracial (NH)	133	117	224	2.45%	2.33%	4.44%
Hispanic or Latino (any race)	745	1,076	1,205	13.70%	21.44%	23.88%
Total	5,438	5,019	5,046	100.00%	100.00%	100.00%

=== 2020 census ===
As of the 2020 census, Big Bear Lake had a population of 5,046. The population density was 808.5 inhabitants per square mile (312.2/km^{2}). The median age was 51.5 years. The age distribution was 16.5% under the age of 18, 5.3% aged 18 to 24, 21.1% aged 25 to 44, 30.2% aged 45 to 64, and 27.0% aged 65 or older. For every 100 females, there were 105.9 males, and for every 100 females age 18 and over, there were 108.0 males age 18 and over.

100.0% of residents lived in urban areas, while 0.0% lived in rural areas. The census reported that 99.3% of the population lived in households, 0.5% lived in non-institutionalized group quarters, and 0.2% were institutionalized.

There were 2,341 households, out of which 21.0% included children under the age of 18. Of all households, 39.4% were married-couple households, 6.2% were cohabiting couple households, 25.5% had a female householder with no spouse or partner present, and 28.9% had a male householder with no spouse or partner present. About 35.6% of households were one person, and 17.7% were one person aged 65 or older. The average household size was 2.14. There were 1,326 families (56.6% of all households).

There were 9,452 housing units at an average density of 1,514.5 units per square mile (584.8 units/km^{2}), of which 2,341 (24.8%) were occupied. Of the occupied units, 58.0% were owner-occupied and 42.0% were renter-occupied. 75.2% of housing units were vacant; the homeowner vacancy rate was 8.7% and the rental vacancy rate was 43.1%.

Racial composition as of the 2020 census
Race	Number	Percent
White	3,653	72.4%
Black or African American	49	1.0%
American Indian and Alaska Native	40	0.8%
Asian	110	2.2%
Native Hawaiian and Other Pacific Islander	7	0.1%
Some other race	571	11.3%
Two or more races	616	12.2%

=== Demographic estimates ===
In 2023, the US Census Bureau estimated that 64.1% of the population were born in California, 21.6% were born in a different state, 1.2% were born in a US territory or abroad to an American parent, and 13.1% were born outside US jurisdiction. Of those aged 5 or older, 82.4% spoke only English at home, 10.5% spoke Spanish, 2.1% spoke other Indo-European languages, 1.5% spoke Asian or Pacific Islander languages, and 3.6% spoke other languages. Of those aged 25 or older, 91.3% were high school graduates and 34.9% had a bachelor's degree.

=== Income and poverty ===
The median household income was $74,728, and the per capita income was $50,506. About 8.0% of families and 9.4% of the population were below the poverty line.

== Attractions and activities ==
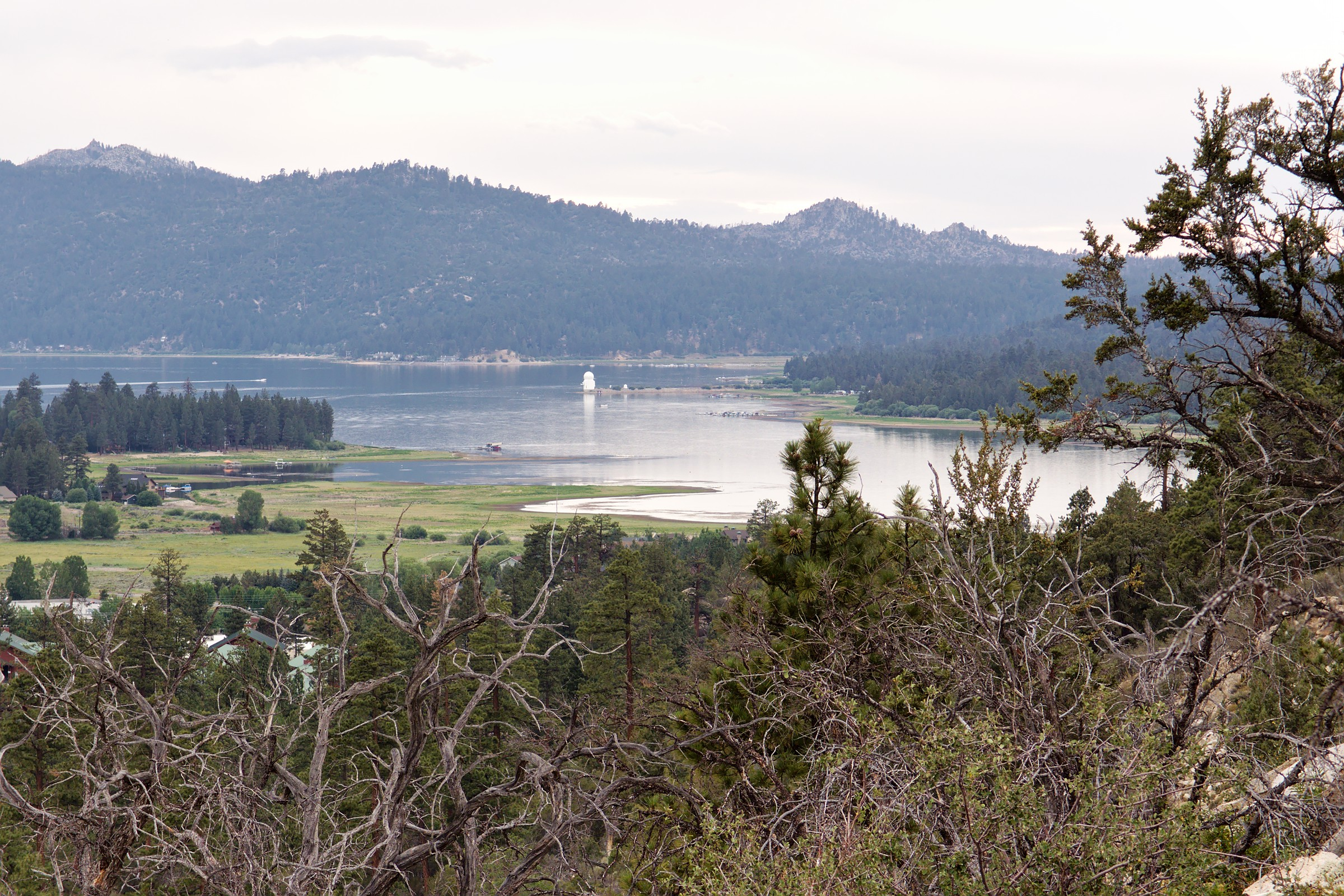
Lake view from the east, with observatory visible in center

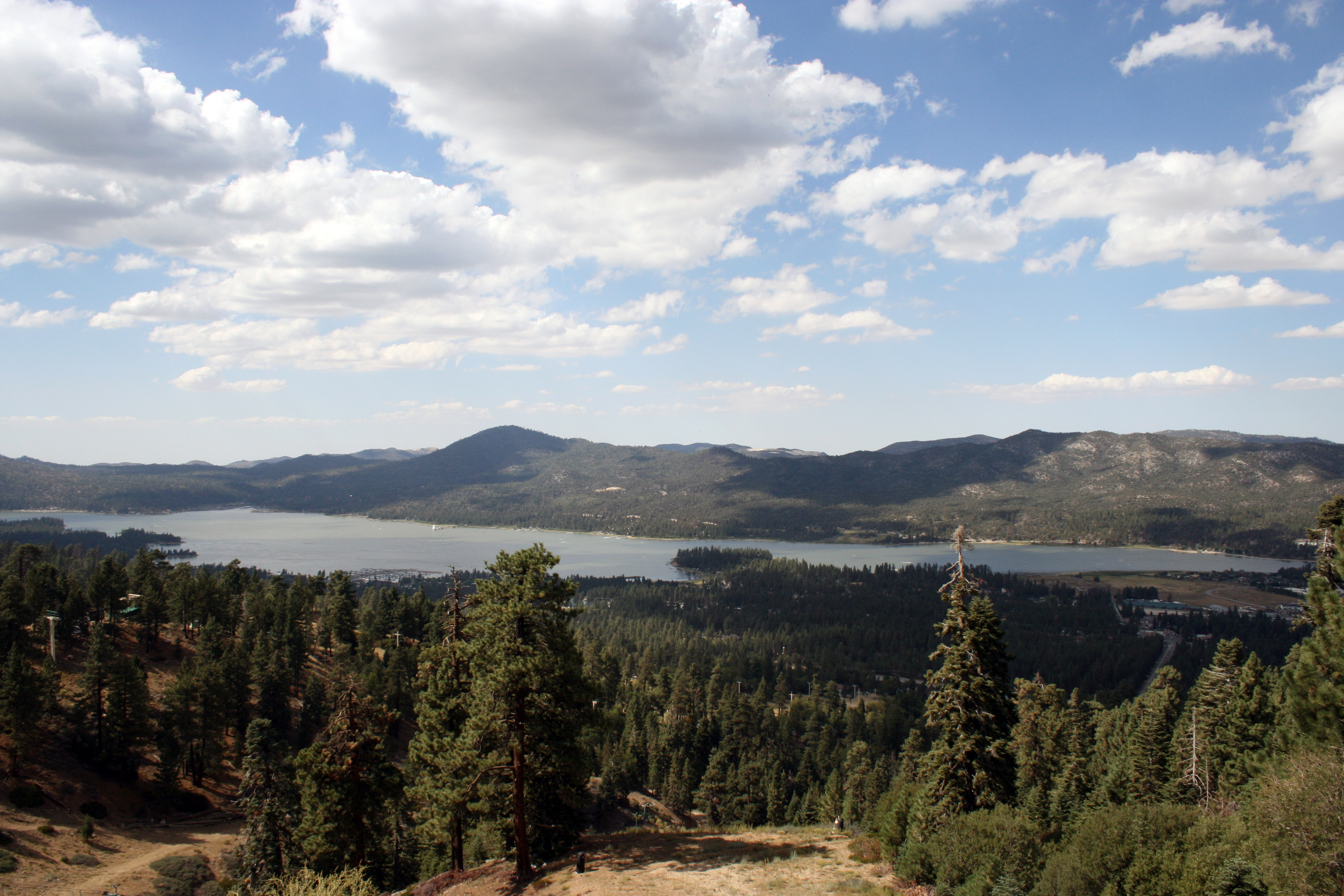
View from the Bear Mountain Ski Resort

Big Bear Lake is Southern California's largest recreational lake. It is about seven miles (11 km) long with a width of about one mile (1.6 km) at its widest point. The primary summer attraction in Big Bear has been fishing, which remains one of the most common activities. The most abundant types of fish are trout, bass and catfish. Hiking, mountain biking and horse riding are also very popular. San Bernardino National Forest offers many trails in varying degrees of difficulty. During winter season Big Bear Lake becomes a skiing and snowboarding destination for Southern California. There are two ski resorts: Snow Summit and Bear Mountain. The first Winter X Games were held in Big Bear Lake in 1997. The town was also home to the Big Bear Lake International Film Festival from 2000 to 2014. The Alpine Slide at Magic Mountain, an amusement park, is located in the city.

In addition to these events, Big Bear Lake is known for its resident bald eagle couple, Jackie and Shadow. There is a YouTube channel dedicated to a live feed of their nest which allows viewers to watch their daily activities and observe their nestbuilding and feeding behaviors. The channel is operated by Friends of Big Bear Valley. Jackie died in August 2026.

== Library ==
The community is served by the Big Bear Lake Branch of the San Bernardino County Library. The 8,500-square-foot (790 m^{2}) library is located on Garstin Drive near the southern shore of Big Bear Lake and offers books, videos, CDs, DVDs, audio books, e-books, computers, and internet access for patrons. The library was remodeled in 2009, with improvements that included additional public computers and a new circulation desk that allows for self check-out. Story times for younger children, teen programs, donated book sales, and special events are also held at the library.

== Government ==
Big Bear Lake is a charter city under the laws of the state of California. It operates under the council-manager form of government. The city manager is Erik Sund. The city council includes five members elected at-large. The mayor is selected annually from among the city council members. The current mayor is Perri Melnick.

In the state legislature, Big Bear Lake is in the 19th Senate District, represented by Republican Senator Rosilicie Ochoa Bogh, and in the 34th Assembly District, represented by Republican Assembly Member Tom Lackey.

Federally, Big Bear Lake is in California's 23rd congressional district, represented by Republican Jay Obernolte.

== Transportation ==
Big Bear City Airport, a general aviation airport in the Big Bear City section of unincorporated San Bernardino County, serves Big Bear Lake.

Free local bus service is provided by Mountain Transit, formerly known as Mountain Area Regional Transit Authority (MARTA), operates several fixed routes in the Big Bear Valley. Mountain Transit also provides service from downtown San Bernardino to Big Bear Lake.

The Big Bear Valley is accessible by four California state highways: SR 18 from Highland, SR 330 from San Bernardino, SR 38 from Redlands, and SR 18 from Lucerne Valley.

== Big Bear Grizzly ==
Big Bear Grizzly
- Type: Weekly newspaper
- Owner: Gold Mountain California News Media Inc.
- Editor: Stacy Moore
- Founded: 1941
- Language: English
- Headquarters: Big Bear Lake, California
- ISSN: 1073-6867
- OCLC number: 28739053
- Website: bigbeargrizzly.net

The Big Bear Grizzly, the "Media of the Mountain", is a local weekly newspaper serving Big Bear Lake, California and surrounding communities. The Big Bear Grizzly is owned by Gold Mountain California News Media Inc. The principal edition of Big Bear Grizzly is published weekly on Wednesdays. A free edition, entitled the Grizzly Weekender, is delivered to most areas of the Big Bear Valley each Saturday. The newspaper also produces a weekly shopper's guide called the Big Bear Shopper.

This paper covers local council meetings, festivals, fundraisers, recreation opportunities on Big Bear Lake and nearby, and other events in the area.

== Education ==
It is in the Bear Valley Unified School District.

== Notable people ==
- Ryan Hall (born 1983 in Big Bear Lake), long-distance runner who won the marathon at the 2008 United States Olympic Trials and placed 10th in the Olympic marathon in Beijing; holds the U.S. record in the half marathon with a time of 0:59:43, becoming the first U.S. runner to break the one-hour barrier in the event
- Taran Killam (born 1982), actor and comedian best known for his television work on shows such as The Amanda Show, Scrubs, Wild 'N Out, MADtv, Stuck in the Suburbs; previously a cast member on Saturday Night Live
- Ed Masuga (born 1978), singer/songwriter based in the San Francisco Bay Area
- Jay Obernolte, current representative for California's 23rd Congressional District
- Heather O'Rourke, of Poltergeist (1982) fame; lived at Big Bear Lake in the mid-1980s
- Max Rafferty, former California Superintendent of Public Instruction and Republican U.S. Senate nominee in 1968; school administrator at Big Bear Lake High School in the late 1940s
- Jordan Romero, climber of the Seven Summits at the age of 15, breaking the past record set by George Atkinson

== Sister cities ==
- Abtenau, Austria

== See also ==
- 1992 Big Bear earthquake
- Big Bear Discovery Center
