= California State Route 38 =

Highway in California

State Route 38
- SR 38 highlighted in red

Route information
- Maintained by Caltrans
- Length: 59 mi (95 km)
- Tourist routes: Rim of the World Scenic Byway

Major junctions
- West end: I-10 in Redlands
- SR 18 near Big Bear
- East end: SR 18 near Big Bear City

Location
- Country: United States
- State: California
- Counties: San Bernardino

Highway system
- State highways in California; Interstate; US; State; Scenic; History; Pre‑1964; Unconstructed; Deleted; Freeways
| ← SR 37 | → SR 39 |

State Route 38 (SR 38) is a mostly rural and scenic state highway in the U.S. state of California, connecting Interstate 10 in Redlands with State Route 18 in the Big Bear Lake area. It is one of the primary routes into the San Bernardino Mountains. Despite the orientation of its alignment, SR 38 is assigned in a west–east direction.

== Route description ==
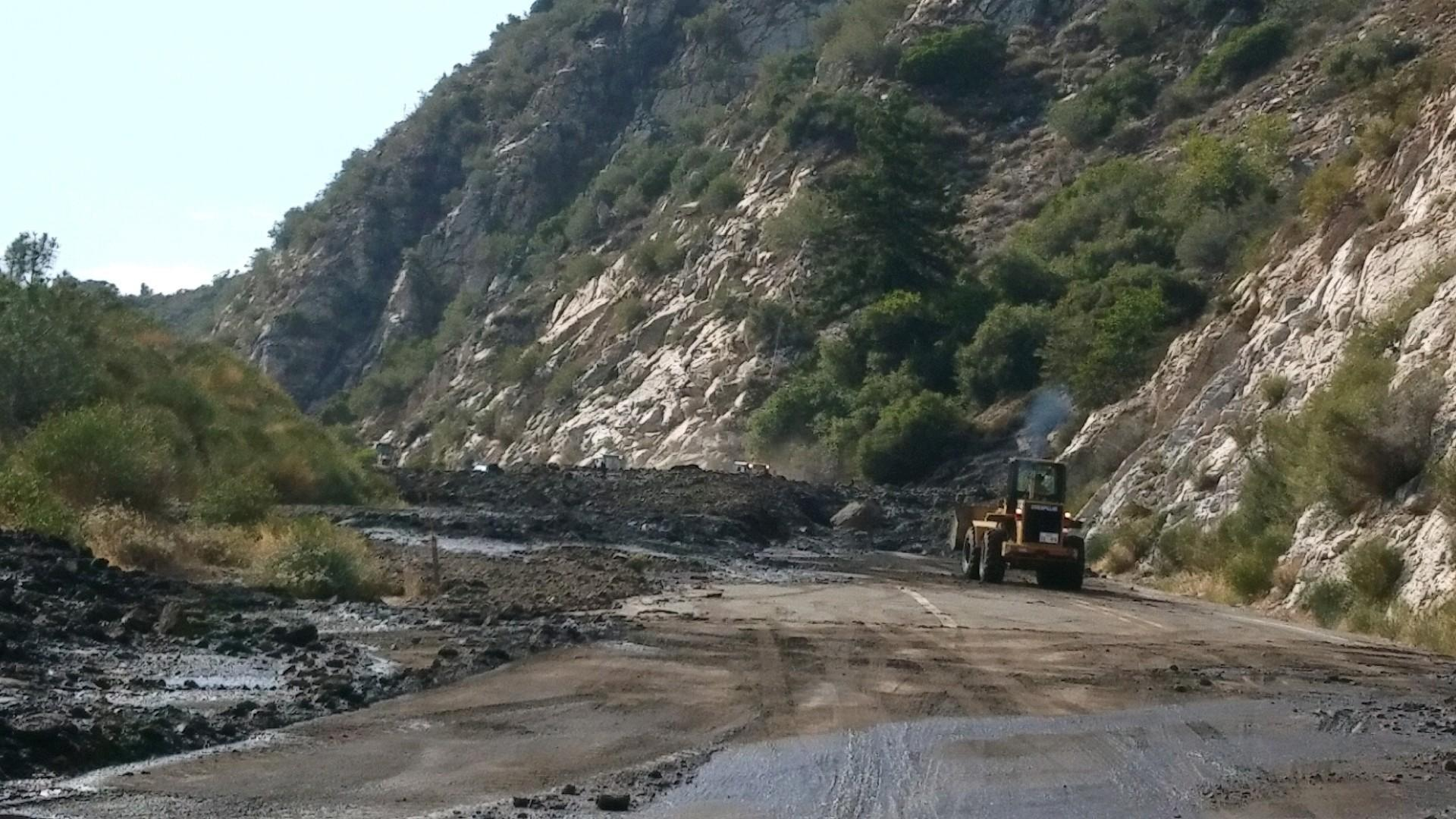
SR 38 obstructed by a debris flow in 2018

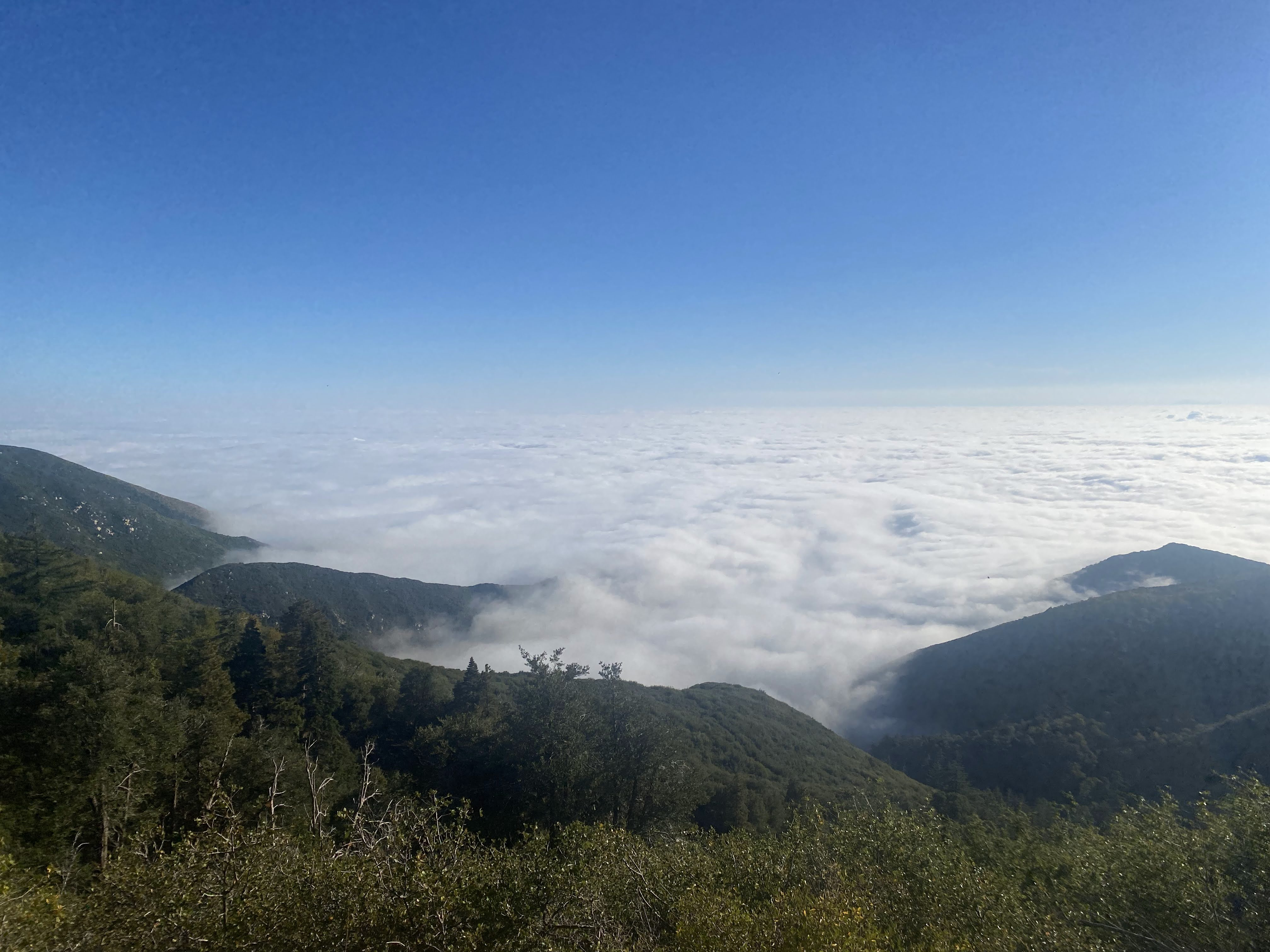
SR 38 offers views of the San Bernardino Valley, here obscured by clouds

Route 38 is defined in section 338 of the California Streets and Highways Code. The definition omits the concurrency with Route 18 instead of duplicating that segment in the other route's definition in the code:

Route 38 is from:
(a) Route 10 near Redlands to Route 18 near Baldwin Lake via Barton Flats.
(b) Route 18 near Baldwin Lake along the north side of Big Bear Lake to Route 18 near the west end of Big Bear Lake.

SR 38 begins at its west junction with State Route 18 adjacent to the westernmost point of Big Bear Lake near the City of Big Bear Lake. Bordering the north shore of the lake, it traverses North Shore Drive as it passes Fawnskin and Minnelusa. After it passes Big Bear City Airport, it reaches its northeast junction with State Route 18 at Greenway Drive in Big Bear City. Route 38 then turns south, sharing Greenway Drive with Route 18. Both route signs continue on Greenway Drive to its intersection with Big Bear Boulevard. At the intersection, Route 18 turns west and Route 38 turns east onto Big Bear Boulevard. Route 38 continues easterly on Big Bear Boulevard to its intersection with Greenspot Boulevard and Shay Road.

The route then turns southeast onto Greenspot Boulevard. SR 38 leaves Big Bear City, and ascends southeasterly, reaching Onyx Summit at 8,443 ft (2,573 m), near 9,114 ft (2,778 m) Onyx Peak; in the vicinity of this location, Route 38 is one of the highest roads in southern California. After the summit, the highway turns briefly southerly and then southwesterly starting its slow descent as it continues along Cienaga Seca Creek until it is just west of the forest road to Heart Bar Campground and to one of the many trails to San Gorgonio Mountain, the highest land elevation in southern California. It then continues northwesterly along the upper Santa Ana River and then, after briefly crossing undulating terrain, westerly through the Barton Flats area, home to many campgrounds. After leaving the Barton Flats area, encountering many small-radius curves, it continues southwesterly through undulating terrain to Angelus Oaks, where Route 38 crosses the ridgeline of the highest peaks in the San Bernardino Mountains.

After leaving Angelus Oaks, the highway continues briefly to the south including many curves; then the highway descends more rapidly as it turns southeasterly and then briefly southerly and southwesterly along the southern face of the San Bernardino Mountains to its intersection with Valley of the Falls Drive, the access road to the community of Forest Falls and to the shortest and steepest trail to San Gorgonio Mountain. Now known as Mill Creek Road, Route 38 turns slightly north of west past the north side of Mountain Home Village and then southwesterly through and adjacent to Mill Creek Canyon before leaving the San Bernardino National Forest and entering Mentone. Upon entering Mentone, the route continues due west, becoming Mentone Boulevard. As one enters Redlands from Mentone, SR 38 becomes Lugonia Avenue before turning south on Orange Street and terminating at Interstate 10 in Redlands east of the State Route 210 interchange.

SR 38 is part of the California Freeway and Expressway System, and the western portion of the route is part of the National Highway System, a network of highways that are considered essential to the country's economy, defense, and mobility by the Federal Highway Administration. SR 38 is eligible for the State Scenic Highway System; however, it is only a scenic highway as designated by the California Department of Transportation between a point east of the South Fork Campground and the intersection with State Lane, meaning that it is a substantial section of highway passing through a "memorable landscape" with no "visual intrusions", where the potential designation has gained popular favor with the community.

The segment of SR 38 from the westernmost point of Big Bear Lake to the San Bernardino National Forest boundary near Mill Creek Canyon is designated as part of the Rim of the World Scenic Byway, a National Forest Scenic Byway.

== History ==
A road that went from Redlands to near Baldwin Lake was added to the state highway system in 1933, and became Route 190 in 1935. In the 1964 state highway renumbering, SR 38 was designated; at this time, the highway was rerouted to the northern side of Big Bear Lake.

== Major intersections ==
Except where prefixed with a letter, postmiles were measured on the road as it was in 1964, based on the alignment that existed at the time, and do not necessarily reflect current mileage. Postmile prefixes include: R reflecting a realignment in the route since then, M indicating a second realignment, L referring to an overlap due to a correction or change, and T indicating postmiles classified as temporary. Segments that remain unconstructed or have been relinquished to local control may be omitted. The entire route is in San Bernardino County.

| Location | Postmile | Destinations | Notes |
|---|---|---|---|
| Redlands | 0.00 | Orange Street | CA 38 follows Pearl Avenue from eastbound I-10 off-ramp at Eureka Street, then turns left to head north on Orange Street |
| Redlands | 0.00 | I-10 – Indio, Los Angeles | Interchange; west end of SR 38; I-10 exit 79 |
| Redlands | 0.59 | Lugonia Avenue | CA 38 turns at Lugonia Avenue/Orange Street; Signaled intersection |
| Redlands | | Church Street | Signaled intersection |
| Redlands | 1.50 | University Street | Signaled intersection |
| Redlands | | Judson Street | Signaled intersection |
| Redlands | | Dearborn Street | Signaled intersection |
| Redlands | | Wabash Avenue | Signaled intersection |
| Mentone | 4.39 | Crafton Avenue | Signaled intersection |
| | 8.53 | Bryant Street – Yucaipa, Oak Glen | |
| | | Enters San Bernardino National Forest | |
| | | Valley of the Falls Drive - Forest Falls | |
| | 25.40 | Jenks Lake Road West | |
| | 26.50 | Glass Road - Seven Oaks | |
| | 29.30 | Jenks Lake Road East | |
| | 39.37 | Onyx Summit, elevation 8,443 feet (2,573 m) | |
| Big Bear City | 49.52 53.92 (Note: Indicates that the postmile represents the distance along SR 18 rather than SR 38.) | SR 18 south (Big Bear Boulevard) / Green Way Drive – Big Bear Lake | West end of SR 18 overlap |
| Big Bear City | 54.54 49.53 | SR 18 north (North Shore Drive) / Green Way Drive – Lucerne Valley | East end of SR 18 overlap |
| Big Bear Dam | 59.40 | SR 18 | East end of SR 38 |
1.000 mi = 1.609 km; 1.000 km = 0.621 mi: Concurrency terminus
