= Starvation (disambiguation) =

Starvation is a severe deficiency in caloric energy intake, below the level needed to maintain an organism's life. It may also refer to:

== Places ==
- Starvation Creek State Park, a state park located west of Hood River, Oregon in the Columbia River Gorge
- Starvation Flats, an area in the San Bernardino Mountains near Big Bear Lake, California
- Starvation Lake, a small recreational and fishing lake in Kalkaska County, Michigan
- Starvation Reservoir, a reservoir in Duchesne County, Utah
  - Fred Hayes State Park at Starvation (formerly knows as Starvation State Park), a state park at Starvation Reservoir

== Songs ==
- "Starvation", by the Jamaican reggae vocal trio The Pioneers
- "Starvation/Tam Tam Pour L'Ethiopie", a double A-sided charity single released in 1985
- "Starvation", Aurora song, 2024, from her What Happened to the Heart? album

== Other ==
- Starvation (crime), a crime under international law
- Starvation (computer science), a problem encountered in concurrent computing where a process is perpetually denied necessary resources to process its work
- Starvation (glaciology), when a glacier retreats, not because of temperature increases, but due to low precipitation
- "Starvation" (Justified), an episode of the TV series Justified
- Very-low-calorie diet (also starvation diet), a diet with very or extremely low daily food energy consumption
