= Fawnskin, California =

Unincorporated community in California, United States

- Unincorporated community
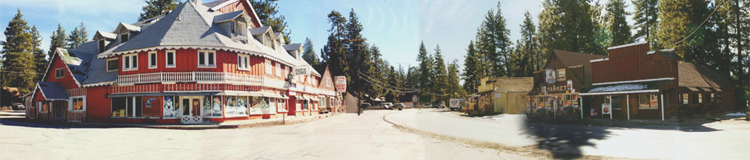
- Fawnskin

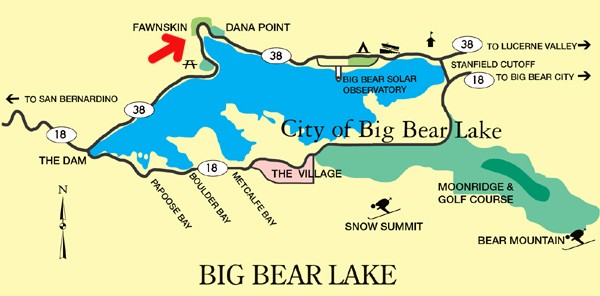
- Location within San Bernardino county

- Location within the state of California Fawnskin, California (the United States)
- Coordinates: 34°16′2.68″N 116°56′49.87″W
- Country: United States
- State: California
- County: San Bernardino
- Time zone: UTC-8 (Pacific (PST))
  - Summer (DST): UTC-7 (PDT)
- ZIP codes: 92333
- Area code: 909
- GNIS feature ID: 271110

Fawnskin is an unincorporated community in San Bernardino County, California, United States. It is located on the northwest side of Big Bear Valley, in the heart of the San Bernardino Mountains, at an altitude of 6,827 feet (2,081 m). The tiny community has a "permanent" population of 380, and many vacation homes that range from multi-million dollar mansions to decaying log cabins. Fawnskin has its own US Post Office, established on May 18, 1918, but to this day, mail must be picked up because there is no delivery service.

== History ==
This small community was once an artists' colony, which attracted artisans, musicians, composers and actors from the Los Angeles area. Mountain travelers in the 19th century came to the Big Bear Valley through Fawnskin on the rough road by stagecoach and later motorcars. Several other names were temporarily chosen for the North Shore village including Bald Eagle Valley, Big Bear Village, Cline-Miller, Grout, and Oso Grande.

The village has always been an attraction to vacationers seeking a retreat from city life in its mountain terrain. Several hundred homes are located along the north shore of Big Bear Lake and in the forested mountainside adjacent to the San Bernardino National Forest.

Gold miners, loggers, and hunters were drawn to the adjacent Holcomb Valley during the 19th century. The Native American legend about how the town got its name has been turned into the urban legend. The Anglo version is that hunters discovered deer (fawn) skins stretched out to dry in the sun. Hence, the area became known as Fawn Skin and later Fawnskin.

Fawnskin was once the hub of lakeside activity, serving as a stagecoach stop and tourist attraction with hotels and dining. The town's main landmark is the Fawn Lodge, built in 1924, but now closed. Composer Fannie Charles Dillon founded Woodland Theater in Fawnskin in 1924, and served as its general manager from 1926 to 1929.

Other notable landmarks include the Pedersen Saw Mill, which lies just west of the lodge; and the historic post office, which lies to the east of the lodge but now is a private home rental. Downtown Fawnskin has some of the oldest buildings in the Big Bear valley.

The Lighthouse Camp and Landing was a popular north shore camp in the 1920s. Hanna Flat Campground, and YMCA Camp Whittle are located within the forest above Fawnskin, and remain favorites of summer vacationers.

Fawnskin's events include the comic Doo-Dah Parade and the Loggers’ Jubilee. The town also claims the only "honest" election in the nation. Anyone can vote for the Fawnskin Mayor as many times as they want, for a quarter-dollar per vote. The candidate who wins is the one who raises the most money. Hence, the town "buys" its politicians. Today, the mayoral race is a fundraising event for the North Shore Improvement Association. Billy Van Vugt is the current mayor of Fawnskin.

Fawnskin is designated as a protected habitat for golden and American bald eagles. Typically, bald eagles are found in Big Bear Valley from November to April, but a nesting pair are full-time residents. Their activities can be viewed live on the Friends of Big Bear Valley Eagle Cam.

In 1998, the multimillion-dollar Big Bear Discovery Center was built, and has plans to expand. The facility is operated by a partnership between the US Forest Service and the San Bernardino National Forest Association.

Following a blizzard in March 2025, three hundred attendees of a climate action conference became stranded at a YMCA campground in Fawnskin. Having run low on food and with buses becoming stuck in the snow, dozens of campers were subsequently rescued by the San Bernardino County Fire Department with a snowcat.

== Notable residents ==
Two publishers and a number of small business owners operate out of Fawnskin. Several writers live there full-time, including William Sarabande. Jordan Romero, who as a 13-year-old boy conquered Mount Everest, is also known as one of the "Fawnskin Folks."

Actress/singer Shirley Jones and her husband actor/comedian Marty Ingels also own a home in Fawnskin. Marty Ingels and Shirley Jones bought a piece of property in 2001 and created Fawn Park in downtown Fawnskin. However, it was closed to the public from July 2006 until it was reopened in September 2011, featuring a memorial to those who died in the September 11, 2001 attacks.

This small mountain resort community's parks include the historic Old Miller School House Park, Dana Point Park, and the Don Conroy Memorial Park. The community also has a Moose Lodge, a restaurant, and a Buddhist temple, but no churches. The Big Bear Solar Observatory is located nearby.

== In popular culture ==
Fawnskin has been a popular filming location and was featured in the 1958 B-movie, Giant from the Unknown, Hallmark's Angel in the Family, Doctor Dolittle II, the 1999 Academy Award-nominated film, The Insider, and many others.

Many scenes of Columbo: Murder by the Book (1971) (with guest star Jack Cassidy, then married to Shirley Jones) were filmed here, as was a Perry Mason episode, "The Case of the Violent Village."

In chapter 35 of Stephen J. Cannell's novel At First Sight (2008), the antagonist Chick Best and protagonist Paige Ellis stop in Fawnskin en route to the Bests' vacation cabin in Big Bear.

The 1997 low budget horror-comedy film Jack Frost was filmed in Fawnskin and largely centered its action around Fawnskin Lodge.

A 2003 episode of CSI: Crime Scene Investigation is set in Jackpot, Nevada, but the scenes were actually filmed in Fawnskin, earning the community about $150,000 in revenue.

== Media ==
The small town's news and informal activities have been reported in two publications, Fawnskin Folks (1920s) and the Fawnskin Flyer (Est. 2005), now defunct.

== See also ==
- Big Bear Lake
- Big Bear Discovery Center
