= Belleville, California =

- Ghost town
- Location within the state of California Belleville, California (the United States)
- Coordinates: 34°18′4″N 116°53′3″W
- Country: United States
- State: California
- County: San Bernardino
- Time zone: UTC-8 (Pacific (PST))
  - Summer (DST): UTC-7 (PDT)
- GNIS feature ID: 269793

Belleville, California was a gold mining boomtown in the San Bernardino Mountains of San Bernardino County, California. The settlement grew up rapidly following the discovery of gold by William F. Holcomb in Holcomb Valley early 1860. Which helped the town challenge the seat of San Bernardino County (which subsequently after the election in 1861 went to San Bernardino). Belleville was named after Belle, the first child born in the new town. It was a busy mining town for ten years, it was virtually abandoned before the end of the 19th century. It is now a ghost town.

== History ==
The first phase of mining was by small groups or individuals for placer gold, by people with claims along stream beds. With better transportation, more prospectors with equipment arrived in the area. When the Bear Valley Mining District was founded, quartz mining began. Stamp mills required to crush the rock were built at different sites in the valleys.

At first prospectors during the gold rush had to travel to Holcomb Valley from San Bernardino by a wagon road into the Upper Santa Ana Canyon, and then north by pack mule up the mountains to Bear Valley and on to Holcomb Valley. In June 1861, Jed Van Dusen built a wagon road down the north side of the mountains through Hesperia and then south through the Cajon Pass, at a cost of $1,500. This enabled travelers to reach the town of Belleville in two days by a regular stage from San Bernardino.

In the time of the elections in September 1860, Belleville had a population of nearly 1,500, the largest in Holcomb Valley. It was proposed for the location of the county seat. The matter was decided in the election, in which the smaller city of San Bernardino narrowly won the contest by two votes. Some of the ballots from a precinct in Belleville were said to have been burned by "accident".

With easier access, Belleville grew quickly. Soon it had a store, two butcher shops, two laundries, a bakery, three carpenter shops, two blacksmiths, a stamp mill and a sawmill. It also had several saloons and the Octagon House, featuring dancers who entertained the miners. The many rough and single men made it a violent place. By 1862, Holcomb Valley had 50 murders. A large hanging tree was designated where many men paid for their crimes.

Soon the placers began to run out and the population declined. The remaining miners engaged in the more difficult Quartz reef mining. Belleville was eventually abandoned. The gold rush in Holcomb Valley lasted about 10 years, from 1860 to 1870. Hard rock mining continued for decades more in the mountains. For example, Lucky Baldwin's Gold Mountain Mine produced from 1860 until 1919.

== Civil War era ==
In 1860–1861, leading up to and during the start of the Civil War, Belleville was a hotbed of secessionist sympathizers. United States officials feared they were organizing with others in Southern California to take control of weapons arsenals, secede from the Union, and join the Confederacy. The U.S. government sent federal troops on August 25, 1861 to San Bernardino to prevent such actions. The troops traveled secretly at night to avoid an expected ambush. No revolt occurred, despite rumors of secessionists' mobilizing in Belleville and the Mojave Desert. The appearance of a squadron of First U.S. Dragoons in town on election day quelled an incipient secessionist riot in San Bernardino. A few days later, a robbery on the pack trail to Bear Valley was attributed to the secessionists.
