= Goode Solar Telescope =

Scientific facility in Big Bear Lake, California, U.S.

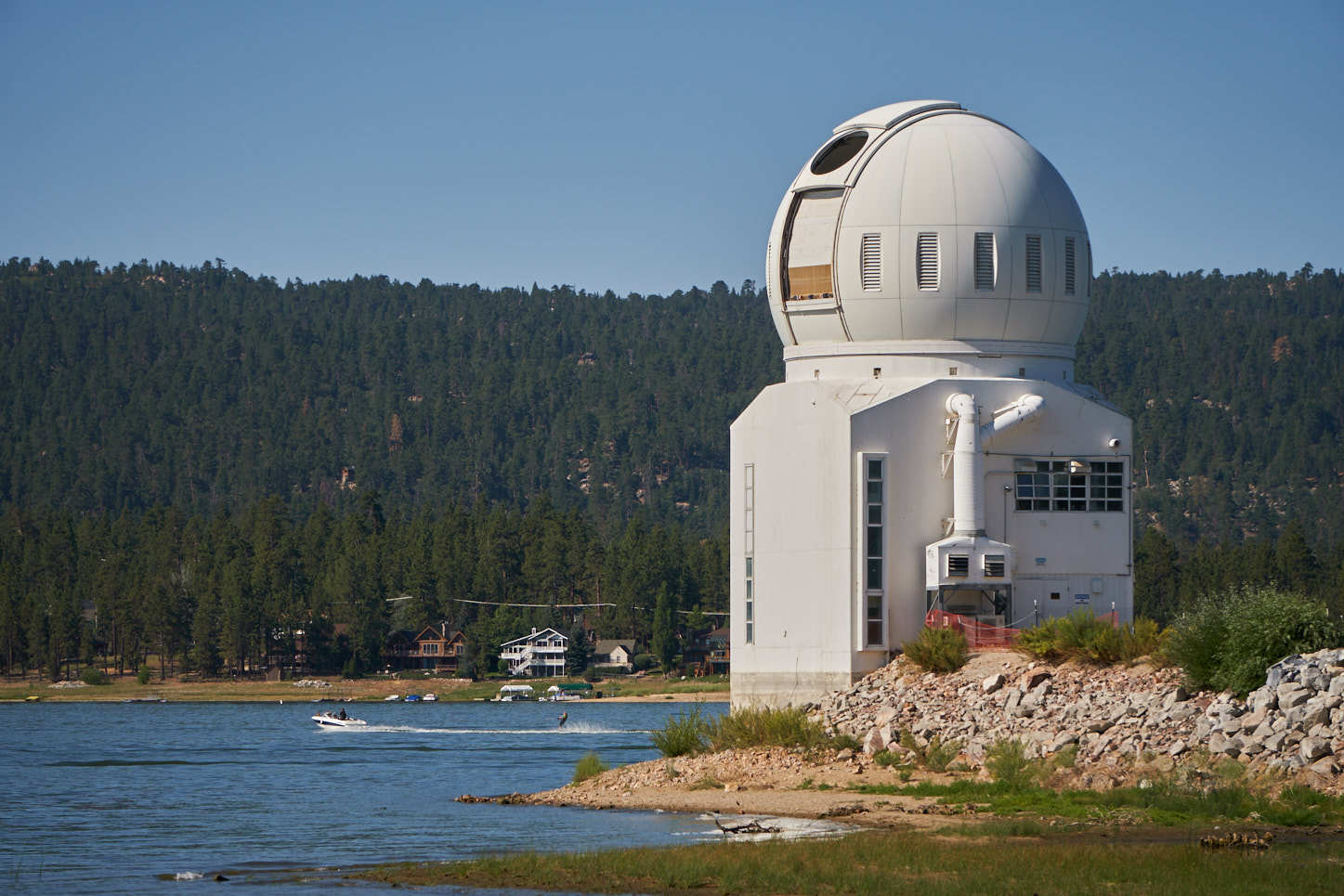
- Alternative names: New Solar Telescope
- Location(s): California, Pacific States Region
- Coordinates: 34°15′30″N 116°55′16″W
- Altitude: 2,060 m (6,760 ft)
- Diameter: 1.6 m (5 ft 3 in)
- Collecting area: 2 m^{2} (22 sq ft)
- Location of Goode Solar Telescope
- Related media on Commons

The Goode Solar Telescope (GST) is a scientific facility for studies of the Sun named after Philip R. Goode. It was the solar telescope with the world's largest aperture in operation for more than a decade. Located in Big Bear Lake; California, the Goode Solar Telescope is the main telescope of the Big Bear Solar Observatory operated by the New Jersey Institute of Technology (NJIT). Initially named New Solar Telescope (NST), first engineering light was obtained in December 2008, and scientific observations of the Sun began in January 2009. On July 17, 2017, the NST was renamed in honor of Goode, a former, and founding director of NJIT's Center for Solar-Terrestrial Research and the principal investigator of the facility. Goode conceived, raised the funds, and assembled the team that built and commissioned the telescope, and it was the highest resolution solar telescope in the world (until the end of 2019) and the first facility class solar telescope built in the U.S. in a generation.

The GST is capable of observing the Sun in visible to near-infrared wavelengths and features a 1.7-meter primary mirror in an off-axis Gregorian configuration that provides a 1.6-meter clear, unobstructed aperture. Adaptive optics correct for atmospheric schlieren in the solar image known as astronomical seeing.

== Main telescope structure ==
The f/2.4 primary mirror is a 1.7-meter off-axis section of a 5.3-meter diameter, f/0.73 concave parabola. It was cast from Zerodur by Schott and polished at the Richard F. Caris Mirror Laboratory of the University of Arizona. The figure error with respect to a parabola is 16 nm RMS. The secondary mirror, a concave ellipsoid, is mounted on a hexapod to compensate for thermal expansion and bending of the telescope structure keeping the mirror in its optimal position.

A reflective, liquid-cooled circular field-stop in the primary focus before the secondary mirror limits the field of view to 120 arcseconds in order to reduce the solar heat load on subsequent optics. The GST is mounted on an equatorial mount made by DFM Engineering inside a ventilated dome resembling 5/8 of a sphere.

== Adaptive Optics ==
The Goode Solar Telescope deploys adaptive optical systems to mitigate image blur caused by atmospheric turbulence. With its single deformable mirror (DM), the CAO system has been routinely used since 2010 for the vast majority of observations and serves all post-focus instruments except CYRA. CAO is a classical adaptive optics system. It uses a Shack–Hartmann wavefront sensor that measures the average wavefront aberration over a field of view of 10 arcseconds and has a single DM with 357 actuators for wavefront correction. In 2016, the BBSO multi-conjugate AO (MCAO) called Clear with its three identical 357 actuator DMs enjoyed a successful first light trebling the corrected field of view by strongly reducing anisoplanatism. By 2020, Clear became a facility instrument, largely replacing CAO and holding lock as well as CAO ever did. Clear is the only MCAO system operating at any solar observatory, and is the only MCAO system with more than two DMs, day or night.

== Instrumentation ==
=== Broad-Band Filter Imager (BFI) ===
Evolution of a sunspot captured with the BFI in the TiO line.

The BFI is a filtergraph made of an interference filter and a digital CCD camera that samples the image of the Sun. The interference filter works as a band-pass filter that only transmits a selected color of the sunlight. Frequently used bands are 705.7 ± 0.5 nm (Titanium(II) oxide (TiO) spectral line, dark-red) and 430.5 ± 0.25 nm (G-band, blue-ish). The BFI camera captures 2048 × 2048 pixel images at a speed of 14 frames per second, covering an area on the Sun of 50,000 km × 50,000 km (70 arcseconds) in the TiO line, and 40,000 km × 40,000 km (55 arcseconds) in the G-Band. Despite adaptive optics, each frame suffers from atmospheric aberrations hindering diffraction limited image detail. In order to obtain diffraction limited resolution, bursts of about 100 frames get digitally analyzed to be formed into a single sharpened image (speckle-reconstruction).

=== Visible Imaging Spectrometer (VIS) ===
The same sunpot captured with the VIS in the center of the H-alpha line.

The VIS is an imaging spectrograph that, like the BFI, captures images of the Sun in narrow wavelength ranges. Instead of interference filters, however, VIS uses a Fabry–Pérot etalon to create a band-pass as narrow as 0.007 nm, tunable from 550 to 700 nm. VIS is frequently used to scan through the Fraunhofer lines at 656.3 nm (H-alpha), 630.2 nm (Fe), and 588.9 nm (Na). Per scan step multiple images frames are captured that also get processed for enhanced image detail.

=== Near Infra-Red Imaging Spectropolarimeter (NIRIS) ===
A dual Fabry–Pérot imaging interferometer for the near-infrared from 1.0 to 1.7 μm.

=== Cryogenic Infra-Red Spectrograph (CYRA) ===
A cryogenic Czerny-Turner spectrograph for the 1 to 5 μm regime.

=== Fast-Imaging Solar Spectrograph (FISS) ===
A scanning echelle long-slit spectrograph.

== See also ==
- List of solar telescopes
