= Fannie Charles Dillon =

American composer

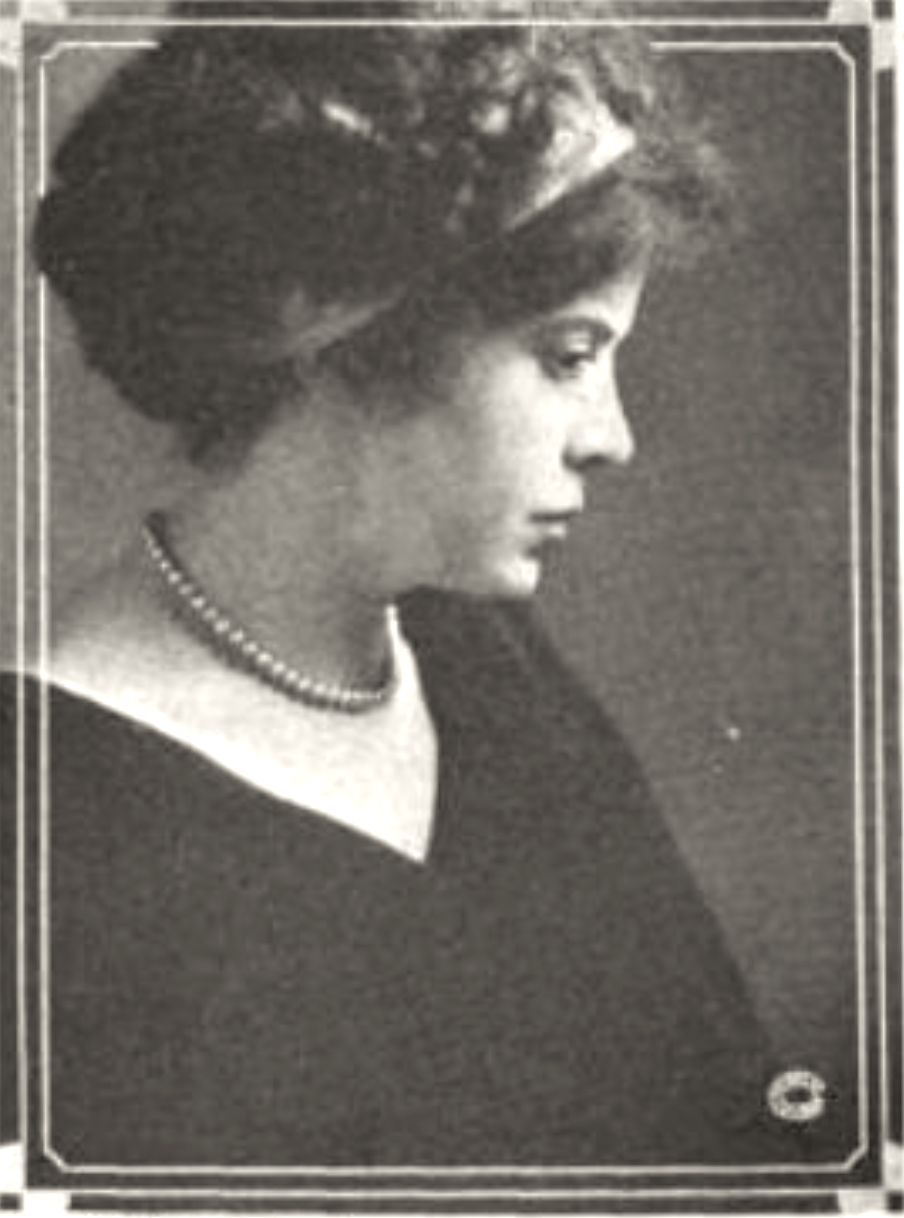
Fannie Charles Dillon in 1915.

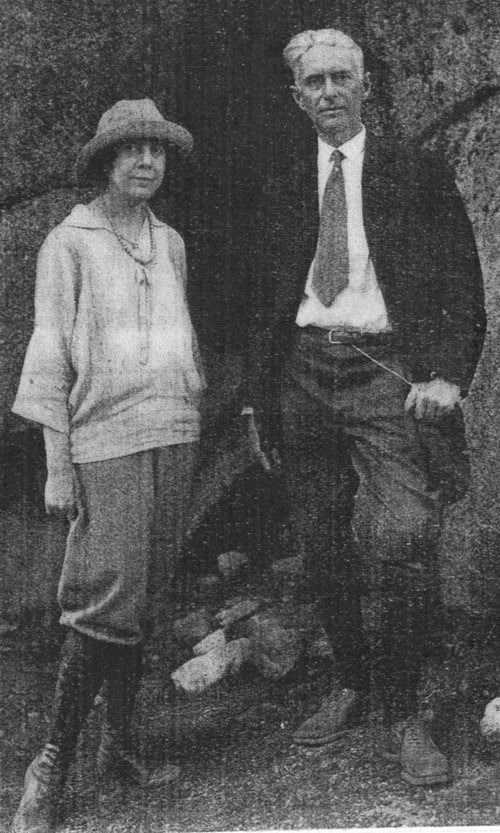
Fannie Charles Dillon and Arthur Farwell

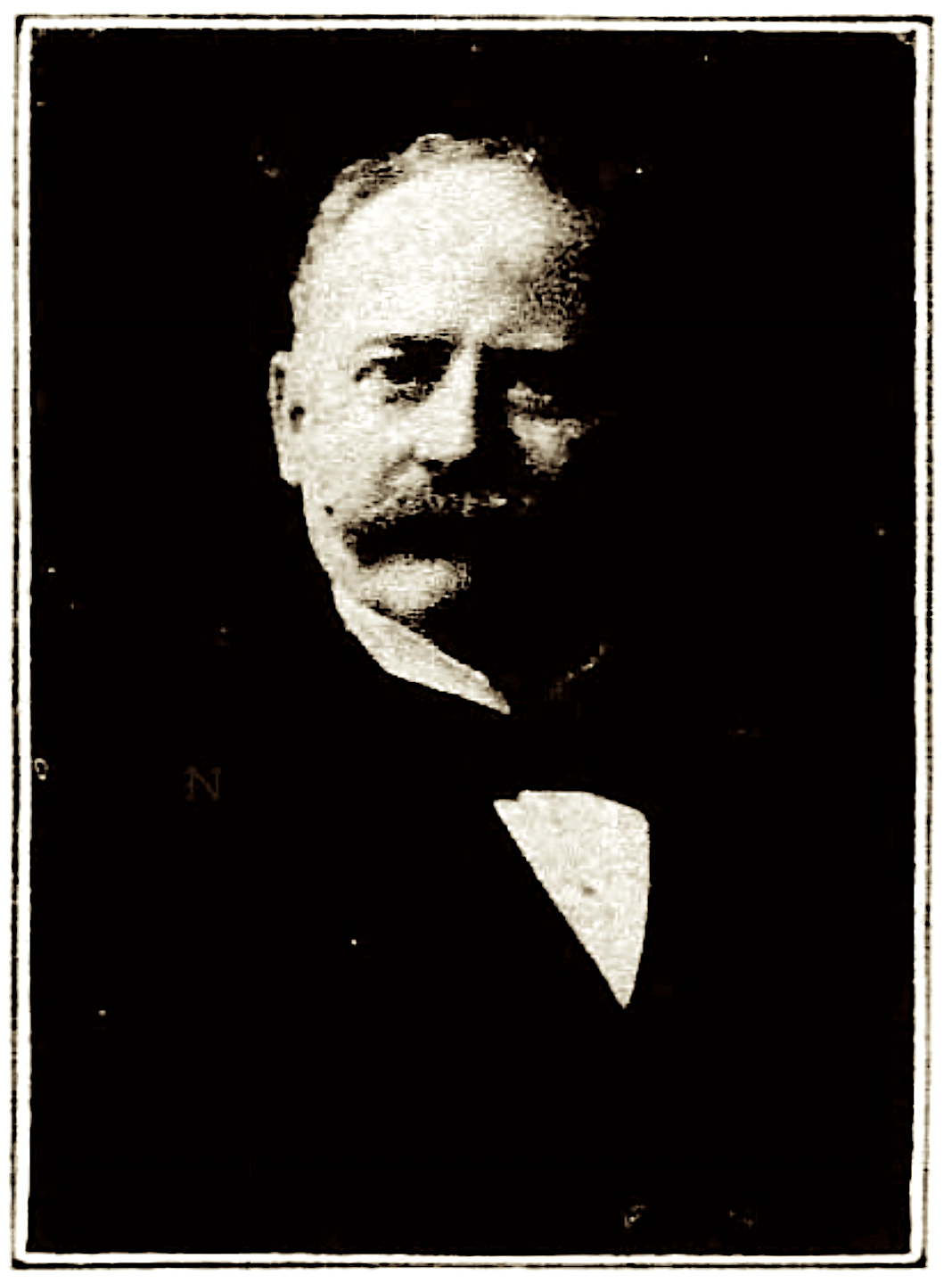
Henry Clay Dillon in 1909. Fannie's father.

Fannie Charles Dillon (March 16, 1881 – February 21, 1947) was an American pianist, music educator and composer.

== Early life and education ==
Fannie Charles Dillon was born in Denver, Colorado on March 16, 1881. She was the daughter of Henry Clay and Florence Dillon, and the younger sister of soprano Enrica Clay Dillon. She had fours sisters and one brother. One of her other sisters was the actress Josephine Dillon who was the first wife of Clark Gable.

Dillon's father, Henry, was a native of Lancaster, Wisconsin. He was a graduate of Racine College and a lawyer in Colorado. He left his position as a name partner in the Denver law firm of Markham & Dillon, and moved the Dillon family to Long Beach, California in 1889. By February 1889 he had a established a law practice in Los Angeles. He succeeded James McLachlan as Los Angeles County District Attorney in 1892. In 1904 he was the Democratic Party candidate for California's 35th senatorial district. He also worked as a municipal judge in Los Angeles in the juvenile court, and taught at USC School of Law until his death 1912.

Fannie Dillon graduated from Pomona College and studied composition with Heinrich Urban, Hugo Kaun and Rubin Goldmark, and piano with Leopold Godowsky in Berlin.

== Career and later life ==
After completing her studies, Dillon worked as a pianist, teacher, performer and composer in Los Angeles. She taught at Pomona College from 1910 to 1913 and in the Los Angeles high school system from 1918 to 1941. She founded Woodland Theater at Fawnskin, Big Bear Lake, California, in 1924 and served as its general manager from 1926 to 1929. She married Cypriot theater actor James Christo. Dillon died in Altadena, California. Her papers are stored by the UCLA library.

As a composer, Dillon was known for adapting bird calls into her scores. While she was teaching at Los Angeles High School in the late 1920s, future composer John Cage was among her students.

== Works ==
Dillon composed for piano, voice, orchestra and chamber ensemble, as well as for outdoor dramas. Selected works include:

- Nevertheless--Old Glory, drama
- The desert calls, drama
- Tahquitz, drama (see Tahquitz (spirit))
- Celebration of Victory, for orchestra
- The Cloud, for orchestra
- Woodland Flute Call, for organ
- A Letter from the Southland: Mission Garden
- The Alps
- Chinese Symphonic Suite
