= William F. Holcomb =

American prospector

Coordinates: 34°18′10″N 116°53′46″W

William Francis "Grizzly Bill" Holcomb (27 January 1831 – 1909), was an American prospector and the first to discover gold in the region which became known as Holcomb Valley, near present-day Big Bear Lake, California. Holcomb Valley had the most gold of any Southern California field. The boomtown of Belleville grew up there and for a time was the third or fourth largest in Southern California. Holcomb was the first justice of the peace in Belleville and later was elected to county offices.

== Biography ==
=== Early life ===
William Frances Holcomb was born in Tippecanoe County, Indiana on January 27, 1831. At about age 18, he migrated with many other young men in the California Gold Rush for a chance of riches. His party had many difficulties. At the Green River crossing on the Sublette Cutoff in present-day Wyoming, he lost his wagon and entire outfit; his oxen drowned. He had to reach Placerville, California on foot. He failed in his attempts at mining in the Sierra Nevada gold fields and later in the Kern River fields. He went to Oregon for a while, then went down to Southern California.

=== Bears and gold ===
In 1859 while in Los Angeles, Holcomb and a companion Jack Martin heard of the Bear Valley diggings near San Bernardino. They set out to make another try at mining. They had to force their horses through deep snow to reach the Bear Valley diggings. Already Bear Valley had been dubbed "Starvation Flatts" by its discouraged group of miners, who were finding little. Soon after Holcomb's arrival, one of the miners panned some gold from under the pine trees a few hundred feet up the hillside and saved the Bear Valley diggings from abandonment.

Like the others, Holcomb suffered from the lack of supplies and minimal gold finds in the rural mountain community. Called "the best sharpshooter west of the Mississippi", Holcomb was asked by the miners to shoot some of the grizzly bears living in the area for their meat. Holcomb was able to bring back dead bears to feed the starving miners. He was nicknamed "Grizzly Bill" because he was known to have killed many bears. He was said to have finished off all the bears in the Bear Valley.

While tracking the bears, Holcomb kept his eye out for gold, and he took chunks of likely rock. About five miles from Bear Valley, he discovered gold. On May 5, 1860, Holcomb and Ben Ware arrived at the office of the County Recorder to record five gold claims located in the Holcomb Valley five miles north of Bear Valley.

That spring, the Bear Valley miners chipped in and sent Martin to San Bernardino for flour. The people there knew Bear Valley was producing little gold, so when Martin paid with gold dust for his flour, the men in San Bernardino followed him back and found out about Holcomb Valley. They rushed to mine its rich sand and shale placers. That was the start of the Holcomb Valley gold rush. By July miners poured into the Holcomb Valley, as the news of gold spread far and wide. The gold rush was on, and miners founded the short-lived boom town of Belleville there. For ten years it was the third or fourth largest town in Southern California. Holcomb Valley turned out to be the source of more gold than any other part of Southern California.

=== Marriage and family ===
With some financial future seeming in his grasp, in 1860 Holcomb married Nancy Stewart and built a house in San Bernardino. Nancy's parents were Mormon pioneers. They had five sons and two daughters. His sons were William Jr, John, Michael, Steven, and Matthew. His daughters were Kathryn Holcomb and Annie "Angel", who died of Scarlet fever in her infancy.

Holcomb's grandson, Grant Holcomb, served as the mayor of San Bernardino from 1925 through 1927. His great-grandson, Bob Holcomb, was the longest-serving mayor of San Bernardino in history, holding the office from 1971 through 1985 and again from 1989 through 1993.

=== Political career and later life ===
Holcomb was elected the first justice of the peace at Belleville, but he soon resigned to devote more time to his mines. He returned to San Bernardino during the fall of 1861, where his house was destroyed by the flood of 1862. Holcomb returned to mining in the mountains that summer to make up for his losses. In 1863 he moved for more than a year to the vicinity of Prescott, Arizona, where he mined and hunted.

Upon returning to San Bernardino, Holcomb worked in mountain lumber camps for four years until his election as the county assessor in 1871. He was the first member of the Republican Party to be elected to public office in San Bernardino County. Holcomb held the office of county assessor for three terms. In 1882 he returned to politics, and he was elected the county clerk.

Following his services as county assessor and county clerk, Holcomb became a merchant in San Bernardino.

== See also ==
- California Gold Rush
- Holcomb Valley
