= Big Bear Discovery Center =

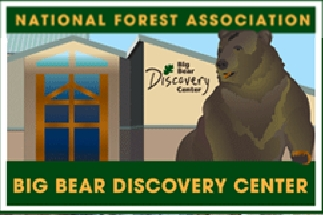
- Big Bear Discovery Center logo

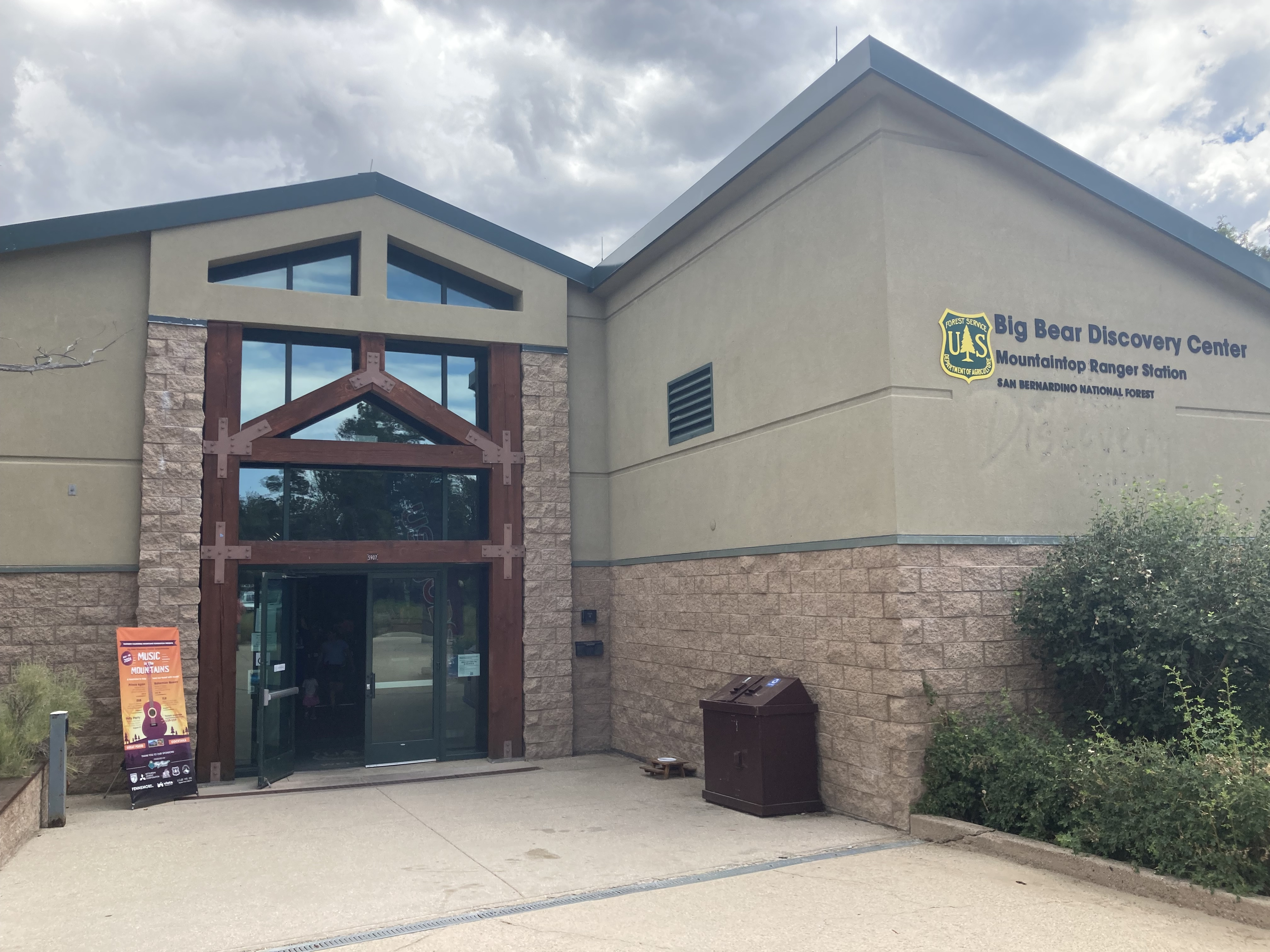
- Exterior

- Location within California
- Established: 1998
- Location: 40971 North Shore Drive/Hwy 38, Fawnskin 92333
- Coordinates: 34°15′48″N 116°54′20″W
- Type: Natural history museum
- Website: mountainsfoundation.org/big-bear-discovery-center

Big Bear Discovery Center is a regional visitor center and nature center, located in the Big Bear Valley of the San Bernardino Mountains, and within the San Bernardino National Forest, in San Bernardino County, southern California. It is in the Mountaintop Ranger District Office complex of the National Forest.

== Description ==
The local natural history museum and information/education center about the San Bernardino National Forest area is co-managed by the Southern California Mountains Foundation and the U.S. Forest Service. It is located on the north shore of Big Bear Lake reservoir, on the North Shore Drive section of California State Route 38 in eastern Fawnskin.

Nearby populated places across the reservoir include the Big Bear Lake and the unincorporated town of Big Bear City.

=== Visitor services ===
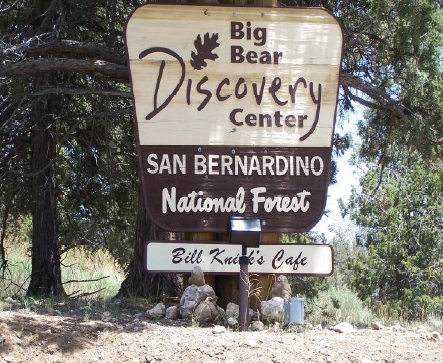
Big Bear Discovery Center sign

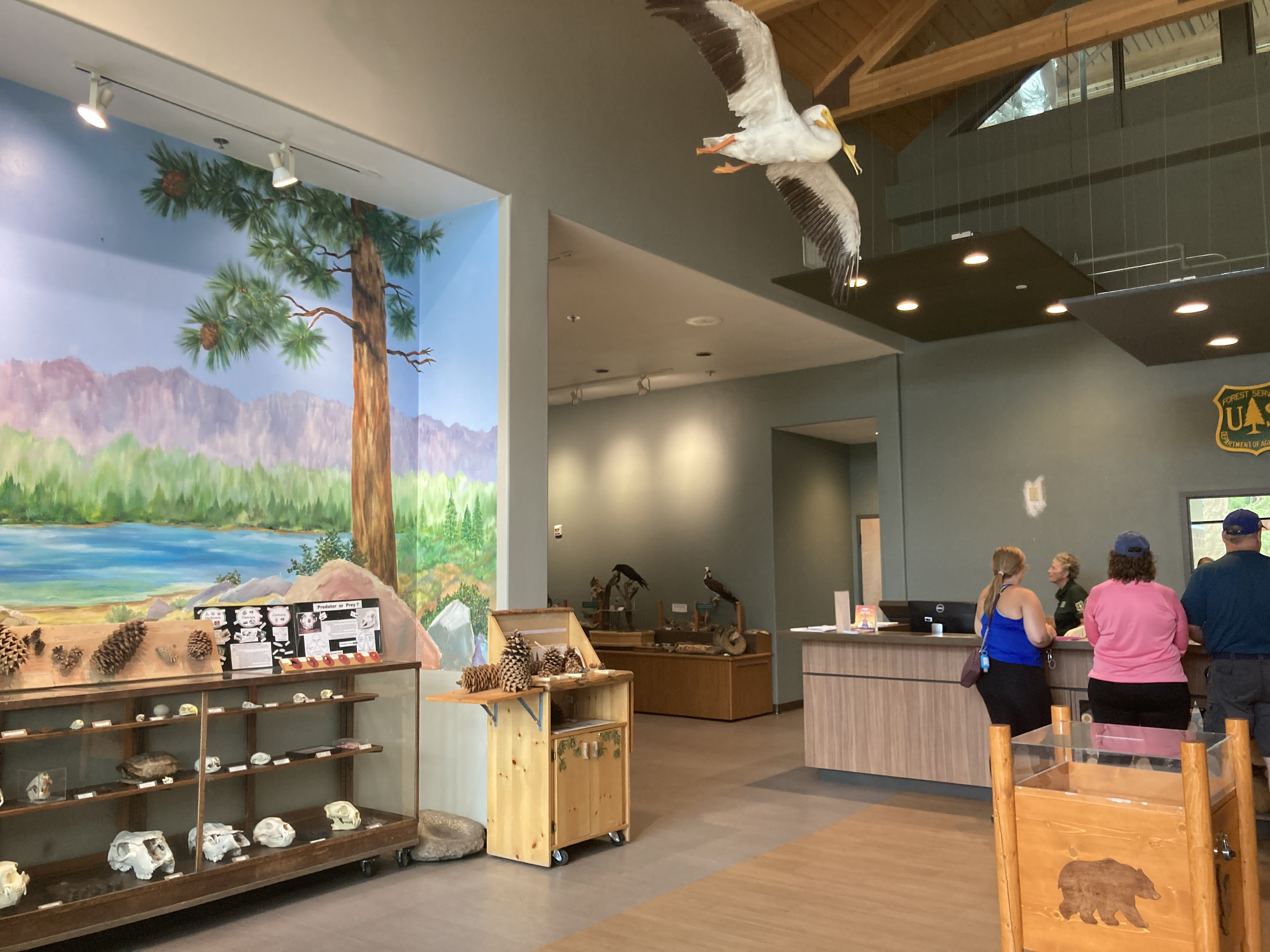
Interior

The center's goals are to help visitors enjoy and be more knowledgeable about the San Bernardino National Forest, including its recreational opportunities and natural history, and to teach visitors how to be stewards of the beauty and natural resources in the national forest and San Bernardino Mountains. The center offers National Forest Adventure Passes, hiking & biking maps, camping information, maps of forest roads & designated off-road vehicle areas, Forest Service permits, naturalist-led tours, and interpretive programs. There is no entrance fee to the center.

== See also ==
- Big Bear Solar Observatory – nearby on the lake.
- Big Bear Valley
- Big Bear Lake reservoir
- San Bernardino National Forest topics – natural & recreational features.

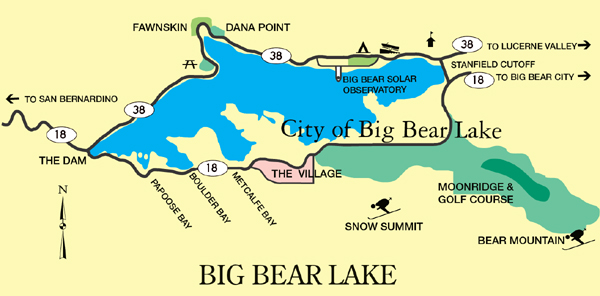
Map of Big Bear Valley.
