= Schiefspiegler =

Type of off-axis reflecting telescope

Schiefspiegler telescope arrangement in which tilt effects compensate for the lateral decenter.

The Schiefspiegler (lit. oblique reflector in German), also called tilted-component telescopes (TCT) and off-axis reflecting telescopes, are a type of reflecting telescope featuring an off-axis secondary mirror, and therefore an obstruction-free light path. This is accomplished by tilting the primary mirror so that the secondary mirror does not block incoming light. William Herschel was one of the first to have tilted the mirror of his telescope in order to avoid light loss due to the low reflectivity of his speculum metal mirror.

The obstructions in telescope tubes, such as secondary mirrors and their mechanical supports, cut off the intensity of captured light and cause diffraction. The diffraction causes artifacts such as the radial spikes that project from images of bright stars, and it also reduces the contrast of fine details. Schiefspieglers offer a significant increase in contrast, which is useful, for instance, for lunar and planetary study.

Tilting the mirrors causes severe coma and astigmatism, however as Anton Kutter showed in the 1950s, by a suitable choice of radii these aberrations can be corrected to an acceptable level.

== Implementations ==
The 1.6 meter New Solar Telescope at the Big Bear Solar Observatory, and the 4 meter Daniel K. Inouye Solar Telescope feature off-axis designs for sensitive observations of the Sun.
