= Big Bear Solar Observatory =

Astronomical facility in California, US

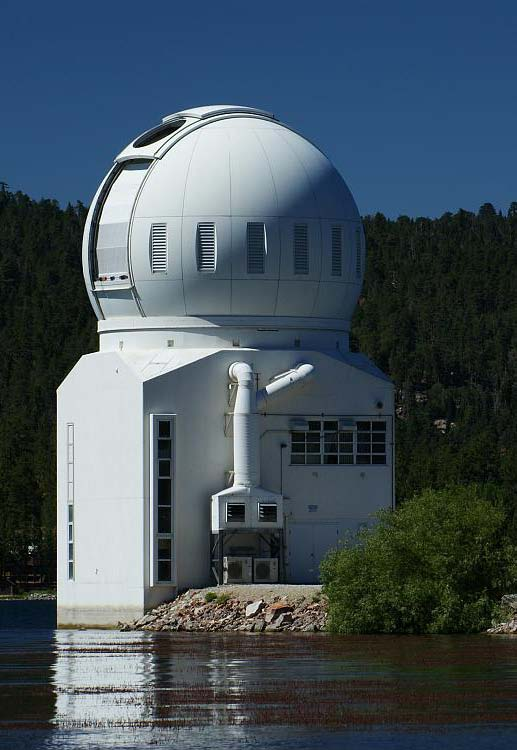
- Dome on the main BBSO building viewed from Big Bear Lake
- Organization: New Jersey Institute of Technology
- Observatory code: G77
- Location: California, Pacific States Region
- Coordinates: 34°15′30″N 116°55′16″W
- Altitude: 2,060 m (6,760 ft)
- Established: 1969
- Website: www.bbso.njit.edu
- Telescopes: Full Disk H-alpha (FDHA) Patrol Telescope; Goode Solar Telescope
- Location of Big Bear Solar Observatory
- Related media on Commons

Big Bear Solar Observatory (BBSO) is a university-based solar observatory in the United States. It is operated by New Jersey Institute of Technology (NJIT). BBSO has a 1.6-meter (5.2 ft) clear-aperture Goode Solar Telescope (GST), which has no obscuration in the optical train. BBSO is located on the north side of Big Bear Lake in the San Bernardino Mountains of southwestern San Bernardino County, California, approximately 120 kilometers (75 miles) east of downtown Los Angeles. The telescopes and instruments at the observatory are designed and employed specifically for studying the activities and phenomena of the Sun.

== Establishment ==
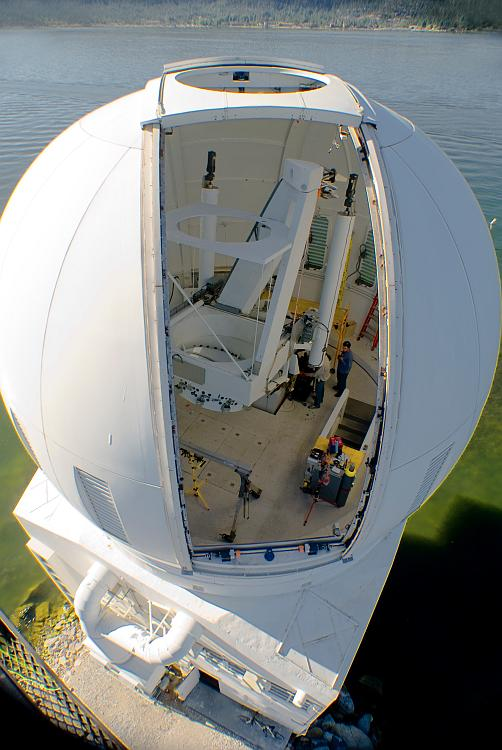
GST During Installation into Dome Fall 2008

The observatory location, on Big Bear Lake in the San Bernardino Mountains, was chosen for its combination of high altitude and daytime stabilizing influence of the lake, which were found to be ideal for solar observation. The location at Big Bear Lake is optimal due to the clarity of the sky and the presence of a body of water. The lake has more than a mile of water to the west, which is the direction from which the prevailing winds come. The cool lake provides a natural inversion that greatly reduces ground-layer turbulence and stabilizes images taken by the telescope (the water provides a cooling effect on the atmosphere surrounding the building and helps eliminate ground heat radiation waves that normally would cause optical aberrations). The lake surface is about 2,055 meters (6,742 ft) above sea level, putting it above a significant portion of the atmosphere. The main observatory building is in the open waters of the lake with an approximately 200-meter (660 ft) causeway extending south from the north shore.

== Instruments ==
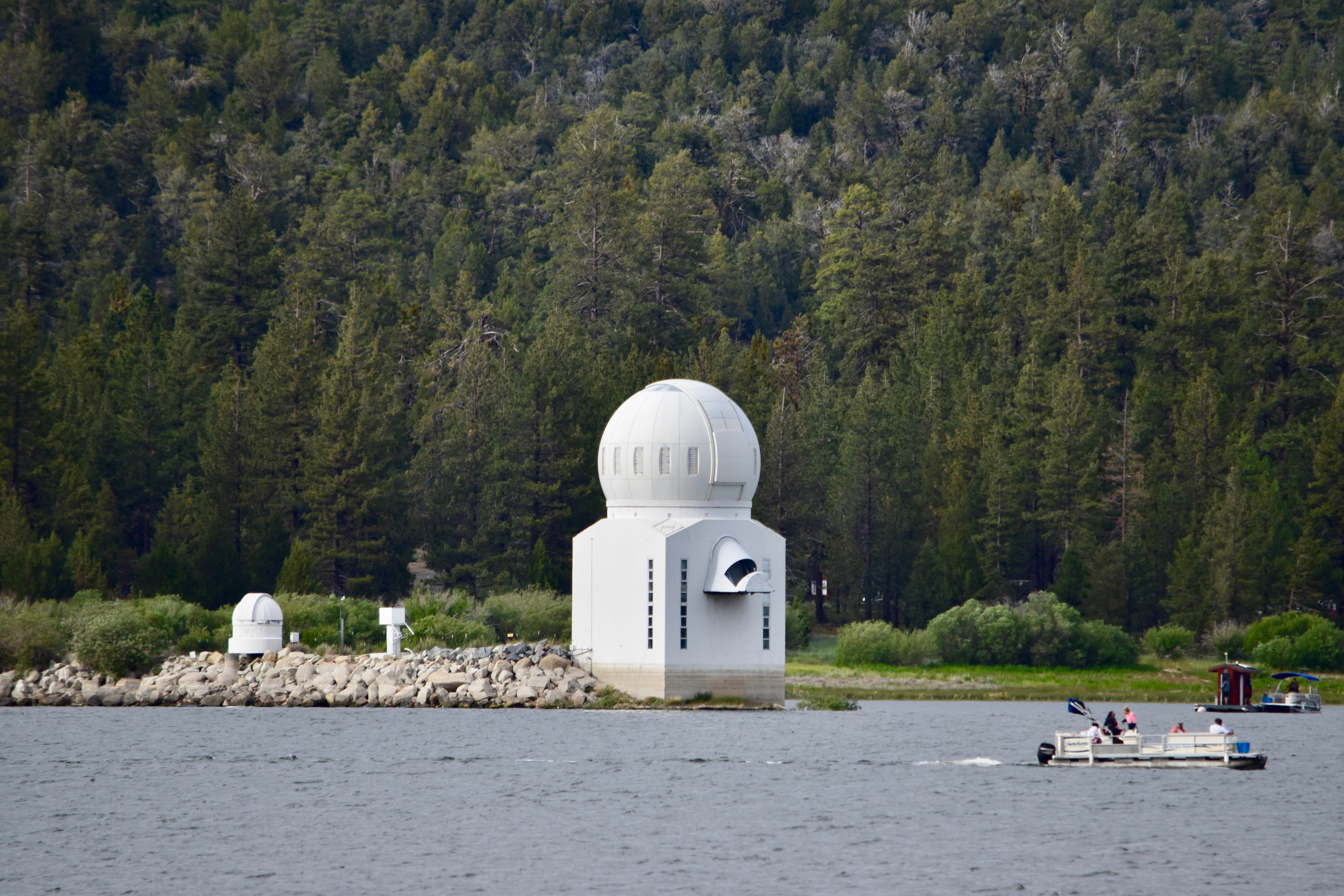
The Ash Dome as seen on the left of the main dome

The observatory was originally equipped with four telescopes, including two 10-inch (25 cm) refracting telescopes, a 9-inch (23 cm) reflecting coronagraph, and a 16-inch (41 cm) Cassegrain reflecting telescope.

In 1997, the primary BBSO telescope was in the 50-centimetre (20 in) class, as were the world's other high-resolution solar telescopes. However, to resolve the fundamental scale in the Sun's atmosphere (photon mean free path of 100 km (62 mi) at the Solar surface), an aperture of at least 1.5 m (59 in) is required. Correction of distortion by the terrestrial atmospheric via adaptive optics (AO) is the enabling technology for the first facility-class solar telescope built in the United States in a generation—the Goode Solar Telescope (GST). The GST is a 1.6-metre (63 in) clear-aperture off-axis telescope, which feeds its unobstructed light to visible-light and near-infrared spectro-polarimeters. The GST benefits from three generations of AO, which now includes multi-conjugate AO (MCAO) in a demonstrator phase for wide-field correction. It is the only MCAO system in operation with three deformable mirrors.

Light corrected by adaptive optics is fed to either the visible (VIS) or near-infrared (NIRIS) spectro-polarimeter. Additionally, uncorrected light can be fed to a cryogenic spectrograph (CYRA) operating out to wavelengths of 5 microns. BBSO also operates full-disk patrol telescopes. The telescopes and instruments at the observatory are designed and employed specifically for studying the activities and phenomena of the Sun.

Construction of the GST began in 2005 and the telescope saw first light in January 2009, with first AO-corrected imaging in the summer of 2010 in the near-infrared. Second-generation AO corrected visible light in the summer of 2012. In summer 2016, the first successful MCAO observations were made, which roughly tripled the corrected field of view—MCAO is essential for studies requiring wide-field correction with high temporal cadence.

The GST was the largest clear-aperture solar telescope in the world, able to resolve features on the Sun less than 50 km (31 mi) across, until it was replaced by the 4-meter Daniel K. Inouye Solar Telescope, which saw first light in 2019. The telescope was named the Goode Solar Telescope in July 2017.

Other telescopes in BBSO include the 10-centimetre (3.9 in) Full Disk H-alpha (FDHA) Patrol Telescope, located in an additional small building called the Ash Dome. It is co-mounted with another small telescope dedicated to observing earthshine. The observatory also hosts a station of the Global Oscillation Network Group, an experiment in helioseismology operated by the National Solar Observatory. It is located at the shore end of the causeway and began operating in 1995.

== Transfer of operations ==
In 1995, when professor Zirin announced his intent to retire as the director, Caltech began to search for a successor. Eventually, the university decided to change the focus of what had been a solar-physics slot in the astrophysics department and to look for another organization to take over the observatory. By the spring of 1996, Caltech announced that the New Jersey Institute of Technology (NJIT) would run the BBSO. The agreement was signed in early 1997 to have NJIT lease the land and buildings from Caltech until 2048. The instruments and grants, worth about $1.6 million per year at that time, were transferred to NJIT on July 1, 1997.

After the transfer, the directorship of BBSO passed to NJIT professor Philip R. Goode. Currently NJIT professor Wenda Cao is BBSO director. Funding comes from NASA, the National Science Foundation, the United States Air Force, and other agencies.

== See also ==
- Big Bear Discovery Center
- List of astronomical observatories
- List of solar telescopes
