= Philip R. Goode =

American theoretical physicist

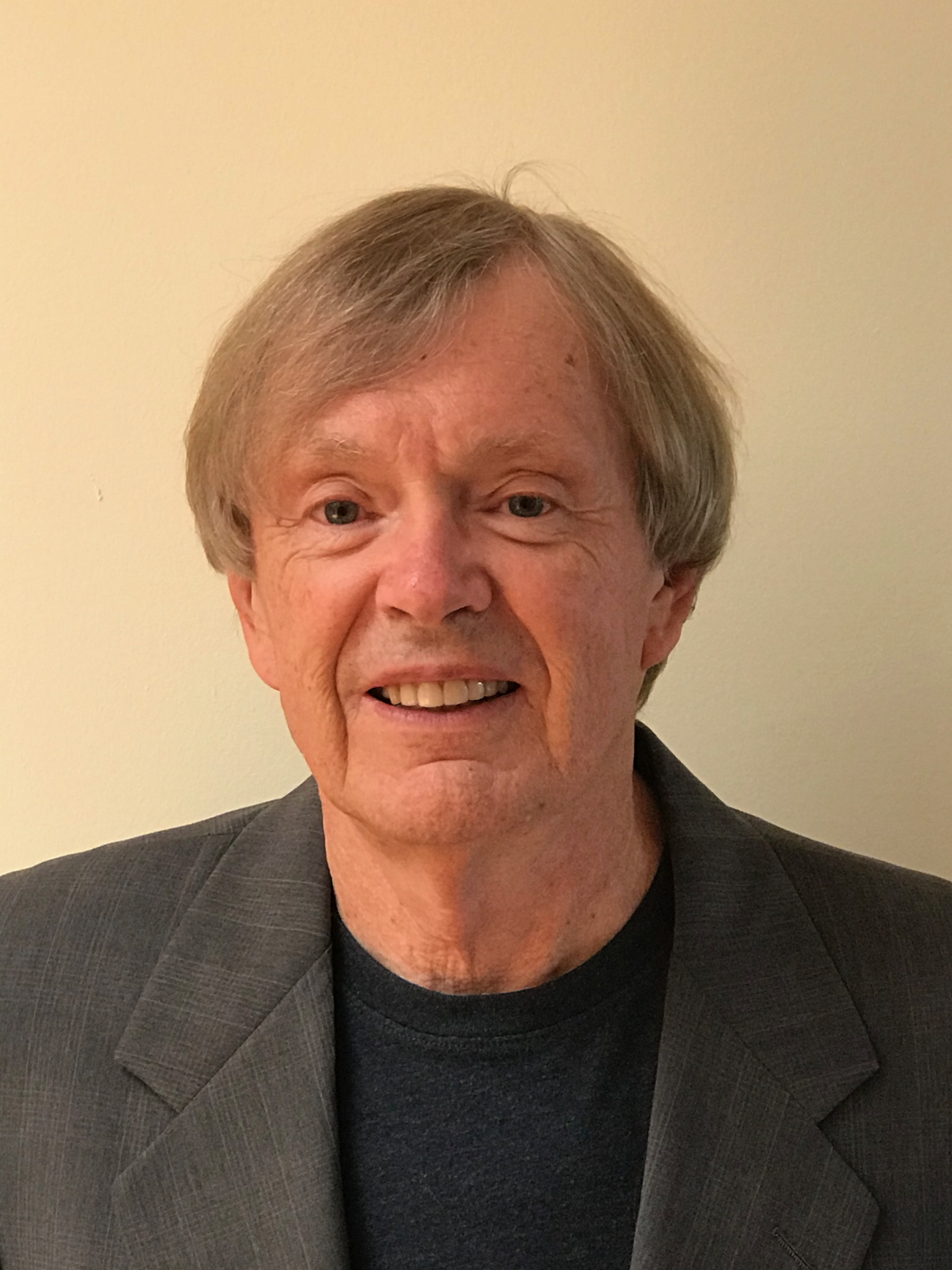
- Philip Goode (2020)
- Born: January 4, 1943 (age 83); San Francisco, California
- Education: Cal - Berkeley, A.B. Physics; Rutgers University, Ph.D. Theoretical Nuclear Physics
- Known for: Solar Physics, Helioseismology, Asteroseismology, Climate Science, Nuclear Theory
- Spouse: Francine Tucker Goode
- Children: Pamela and Gregory; Grandchildren: Max and Sophie
- Scientific career
- Fields: Theoretical and Observational Astrophysics; Theoretical Nuclear Physics
- Workplaces: University of Rochester; Rutgers University; Bell Labs; University of Arizona; Copernicus Astronomical Center; New Jersey Institute of Technology; University of Cambridge; University of Warsaw; California Institute of Technology
- Doctoral advisor: Larry Zamick
- Other academic advisors: Daniel S. Koltun; J. Bruce French; Peter J. Cutino; Wojciech Dziembowski

Philip R. Goode is an American theoretical physicist also working in observational astronomy and its instrumentation. He is a Distinguished Research Professor of Physics at New Jersey Institute of Technology (NJIT) with an H-index > 65 (>12,000 citations from >275 publications). His career divides into five overlapping periods as follows:

- His earliest work in theoretical nuclear physics, 1967-1982
- Pioneering research in theoretical helioseismology (1981-2005)
- He created, developed and directed (1995-2014) NJIT’s Center for Solar-Terrestrial Research (CSTR), which made NJIT one of the most important universities in the U.S. for observational solar physics, heliophysics, and solar-terrestrial physics
- The construction of (2003-2009), and scientific results from (2009-present), the world’s most powerful solar telescope (2009–2019) in Big Bear Solar Observatory (BBSO). In 2017, this ground-based telescope was renamed the Goode Solar Telescope (GST). Goode was director of BBSO from 1997, when the observatory was transferred from Caltech to NJIT, until 2013
- Sustained earthshine studies of Earth’s reflectance (1998–present)

== Education ==
Goode's A.B. in physics is from University of California, Berkeley. His Ph. D. and postdoctoral training were in theoretical nuclear physics from Rutgers University and the University of Rochester, respectively.

== Notable accomplishments ==
=== GST/BBSO ===
Goode conceived, designed, raised the funds for, assembled the team, and led the construction of the first facility-class, ground-based optical solar telescope built in the U.S. in a generation.

The telescope enjoyed first light in January 2009 and was the world’s largest aperture solar telescope until DKIST enjoys first light in December 2019. The telescope was named the Goode Solar Telescope (GST) in July 2017. More than 200 publications have used GST data since its first light until 2022. The off-axis GST is outfitted with three state-of-the-art spectro-polarimeters covering visible up to mid-infrared wavelengths. Since 2010, the GST has been in regular operation with high order adaptive optics (AO) corrected light feeding state-of-the-art Fabry-Perot, visible and near-IR light, spectro-polarimeters in which the GST was used in a series of high resolution observations elucidating unforeseen, significant solar dynamics. In 2016, the BBSO multi-conjugate AO (MCAO) project succeeded in making the first-ever MCAO-corrected observations of the Sun that showed a clearly/visibly widened (roughly trebled) corrected field of view compared to quasi-simultaneous observations with classical adaptive optics. The BBSO MCAO system, called Clear, is characterized by three deformable mirrors (DMs) conjugated to different altitudes above the GST. Clear is now a facility instrument in BBSO holding lock as well as its single DM antecedent (classical AO). By 2021, Clear had been extended successfully into the near-infrared, and Clear was the only MCAO system operating on a solar telescope. Further, as of 2023, Clear was the only MCAO system, day or night, that employs three DMs, which enabled full, wide field coverage resulting from continuous AO corrections from the ground to 10 km above the telescope. Goode was the principal investigator (PI) on all the aforementioned projects in BBSO and his current efforts are concentrated on off-limb single DM AO using prominence light as the "guide-star". This system is now operational and being fine-tuned.

=== Helioseismology ===
Active in helioseismology for over twenty years beginning in the early 1980s. The efforts in which he was involved include the first determinations of the Sun’s internal rotation, its internal differential rotation and determining limits on buried magnetic field and demonstrating that the Sun rotates on a single axis, determining the Sun’s seismic radius. Observationally, Goode led the effort that ultimately showed solar oscillations are driven, in part, by the noise made in the ubiquitous, continuous collapses of the dark inter-granular lanes. Also in the 1990s, he teamed to develop a seismic model of the Sun's interior, which was used to place strong limits on solar opacities and nuclear-reaction cross sections in the p-p chain, as well as demonstrating that there is no astrophysical solution to the sun’s neutrino deficit but rather the deficit is in the province of particle physics, which was subsequently shown experimentally. Further, the seismic age of the Sun (4.6 GY) was determined and is the first confirmation of the age of the Solar System from meteorite data. In his last work in helioseismology, it was determined, self-consistently, that the Sun's surface shrinks and cools by insignificant amounts as the activity cycle rises from minimum to maximum activity/irradiance after a complex competition between thermal and magnetic effects in the Sun’s outermost layers. This last work overlapped in time with the beginning of the construction of the GST.

=== Climate Science ===
The Earth’s climate depends critically on its reflectance. Project Earthshine (PE) led by Goode in Big Bear for more than twenty years reported in 2001 the first modern measurement of Earth’s albedo (~0.30) and later the PE team reported sixteen years of terrestrial albedo variations in which the variations were precisely consistent with overlapping (2000-2013) CERES (Clouds and the Earth’s Radiant Energy System) satellite data with the same inter-annual variations. The Earth’s reflectance shows no climatologically significant trend over the period of 1998-2014. In 2021, the earthshine team reported twenty years (1998-2017) of terrestrial albedo variations in which the variations were consistent with overlapping (2000-2017) CERES satellite data with nearly the same inter-annual variations. Unlike the period 1998-2014, the last three years of data, 2015-2017 showed a sharp drop in albedo (~0.5 W/m2) that alone could cause climatologically significant changes. This effect is also seen in the CERES data, and is primarily attributed to a reversal of the Pacific Decadal Oscillation yielding a precipitous warming of the Pacific coast seas off the Americas, somehow reducing the overhead cloud cover thereby sharply decreasing the albedo for the first time since the warming hiatus of this century began. Climate models do not replicate this surprise decrease and it is, thus, unclear how the climate system disposes of this extra energy.

=== Theoretical Nuclear Physics ===
His earliest work was in theoretical nuclear physics (1967-1982) in which he concentrated on the nature of the nucleon-nucleon interaction inside a nucleus. He also explained a number of experimentally measured dynamical phenomena of nuclei, like why 56Ni decays so slowly. It is the energy from this unexpected anomaly of a doubly magic nucleus decaying that cause Type I supernovae to shine.

=== Mentoring ===
Among 32 students and postdocs Goode supervised, nearly all have careers in various technological fields utilizing their education/training. Of these, 16 have faculty/national center tenure track/tenured positions. Senior among the latter group are Thomas Rimmele (DKIST Director, U.S. National Solar Observatory) and Prof. Enric Pallé (former Director of Research at Instituto de Astrofisica de Canarias, Spain), as well as leaders of solar groups around the world including Prof. Peter Gallagher (Dublin Institute for Advanced Studies, Ireland), Prof. Jongchul Chae (Seoul National University, South Korea), Prof. Haisheng Ji (Purple Mountain Observatory, Nanjing, China), Prof. Carsten Denker (Leibniz-Institut for Astrophysics, Potsdam, Germany), & Prof. Wenda Cao (Director, BBSO). Aside: First NJIT undergrad senior thesis (hydrodynamic limits on the sun's buried magnetic field). Goode supervised Glenn Gaffney who became Director of Science and Technology at the CIA.

=== Leadership ===
In the mid-1990s, Goode founded the Center for Solar-Terrestrial Research (CSTR) at NJIT (originally called the Center for Solar Research until the addition of the terrestrial component in 2002). Goode grew the NJIT solar-terrestrial program from a single faculty member to seven tenured solar-terrestrial faculty with facilities in California (Big Bear Solar Observatory and the Frequency Agile Solar Radiotelescope array in Owens Valley), South America (Fabry-Perot interferometers to probe the terrestrial atmosphere under the equatorial electrojet), geospace instrumentation across Antarctica (i.e., at the South Pole and McMurdo Stations, and at the Automatic Geophysical Observatories (AGOs) deployed across the continental ice-shelf, the Jeffer Observatory at Jenny Jump State Forrest in NJ (which includes a molecular/aerosol lidar system and 48” optical telescope), and automated earthshine telescopes in Big Bear and Tenerife. Most recently, CSTR was the PI institution for medium energy ring current particle instruments that flew (2012-2019) on the twin NASA Van Allen Belt Probe spacecraft.

Goode was the founding director and led CSTR from 1995-2014 and BBSO from its transfer from Caltech to NJIT in 1997 to 2013. He chaired the NJIT physics department from 1984-1990 building the applied physics degree programs.

=== Athletics ===
Goode won three varsity letters in swimming at Cal-Berkeley and held multiple school records in the butterfly and medley relay in the 1960s. In the mid-1960s, he was AAU butterfly champion of New Jersey. In the 1970s, 1980s and 2020s, he competed in master’s swimming and won multiple U.S. national championships in the butterfly, individual medley, and distance freestyle.

== Fellowships ==
Goode is a Fellow of:

- The American Physical Society
- The American Astronomical Society (AAS)
- The American Geophysical Union (AGU)
- The American Association for the Advancement of Science (AAAS)

== Honors and awards ==
- Primary BBSO telescope named Goode Solar Telescope (GST, 2017)
- Tau Beta Pi
- Minor Planet: 11790 Goode (1999)
- First NJIT Board of Overseers Excellence in Research Prize and Medal in 2008
- New Jersey High-Tech Hall of Fame (2008)
- Charles Palmer Davis Award: History/Current Events Expertise (1956)
