= Big Bear Lake =

Reservoir in California, United States

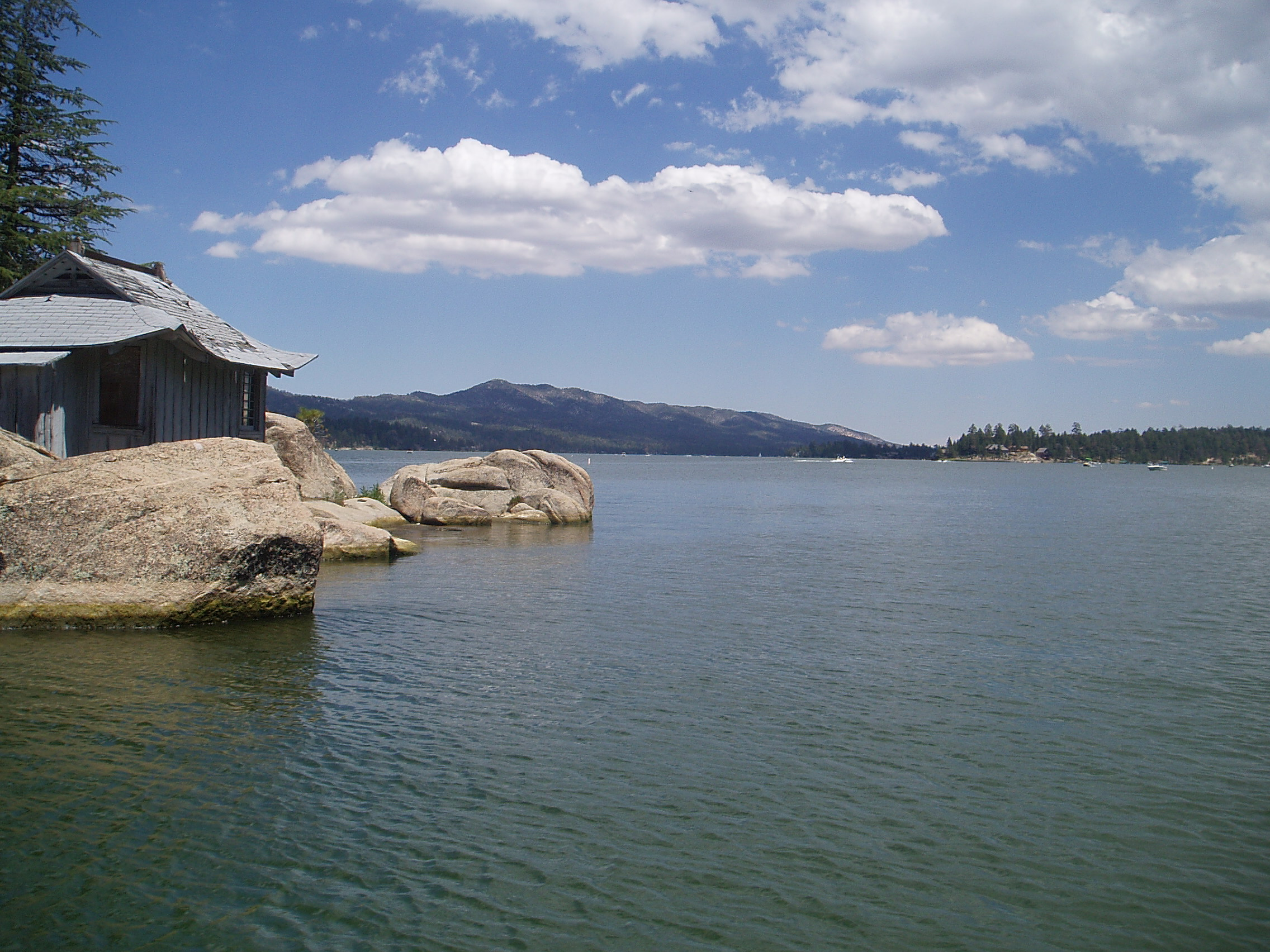
- Looking east from China Island in 2006

- Location in the United States Lociation in California
- Location: San Bernardino Mountains, San Bernardino County, California, United States
- Coordinates: 34°14′31″N 116°58′37″W
- Lake type: Reservoir
- Basin countries: United States
- Max. length: 7 miles (11 km)
- Max. width: 2.5 miles (4 km)
- Surface area: 2,971 acres (12.0 km^{2})
- Average depth: 35 ft (11 m)
- Max. depth: 72 ft (22 m)
- Water volume: 73,320 acre⋅ft (0.0904 km^{3})
- Surface elevation: 6,743 ft (2,055 m)

Big Bear Lake is a reservoir in the western United States, located in the San Bernardino Mountains in San Bernardino County, California. It is a snow and rain-fed lake, having no other means of tributaries or mechanical replenishment.

At a surface elevation of 6,743 ft (2,055 m) above sea level, it has an east–west length of approximately seven miles (11 km) and is approximately 2.5 miles (4.0 km) at its widest measurement, though the lake's width mostly averages a little more than 1/2 mi (0.8 km). These approximations are based on the lake having an optimum retainable water level. At dam's end, Big Bear measures its deepest water at 72 feet (22 m).

Old Bear Valley Dam
- Interactive map of Old Bear Valley Dam

History
- Built: 1884; 142 years ago

Site notes
- Architect: Frank Brown

California Historical Landmark
- Designated: February 5, 1960
- Reference no.: 725

== History ==
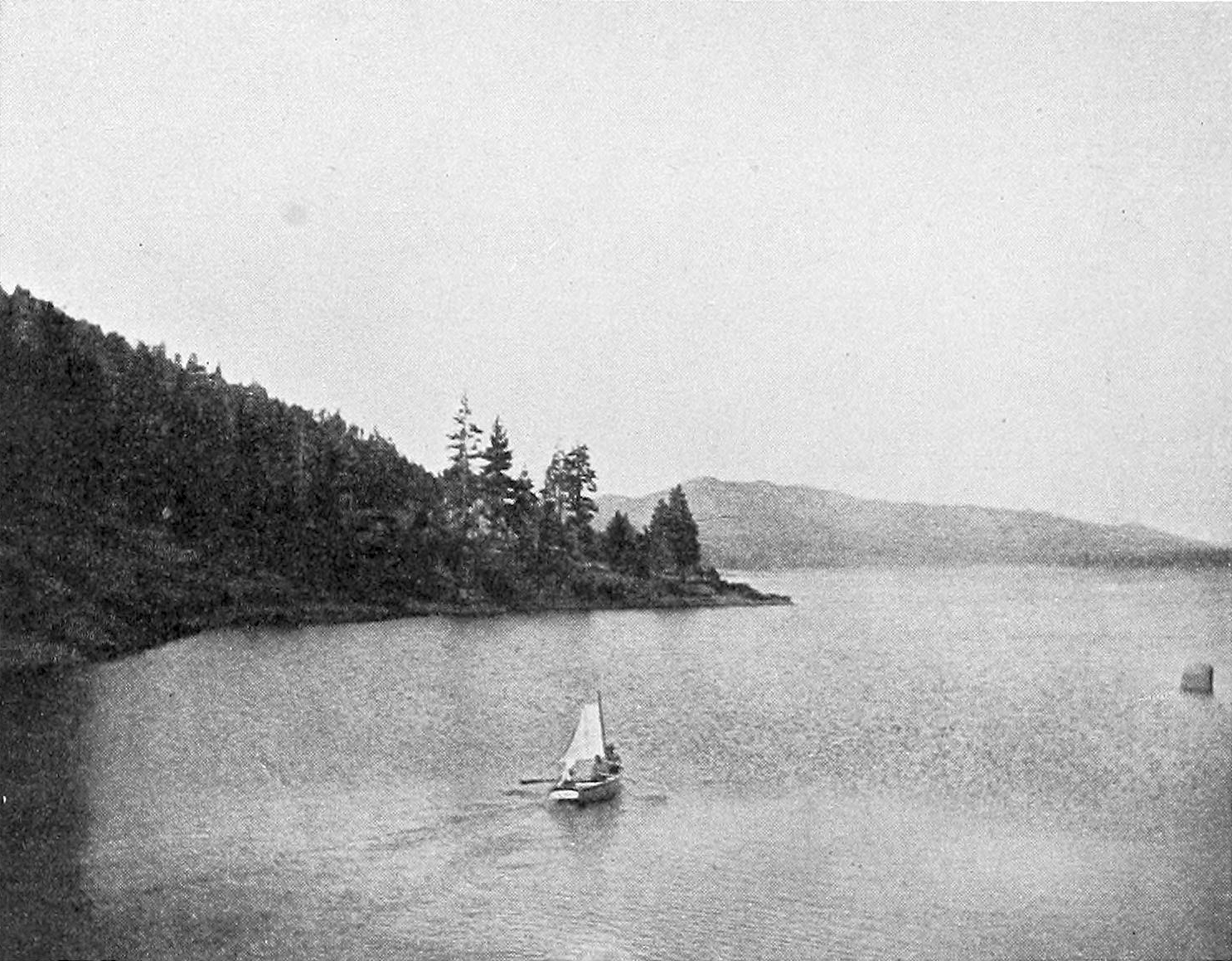
Sailing, c. 1906

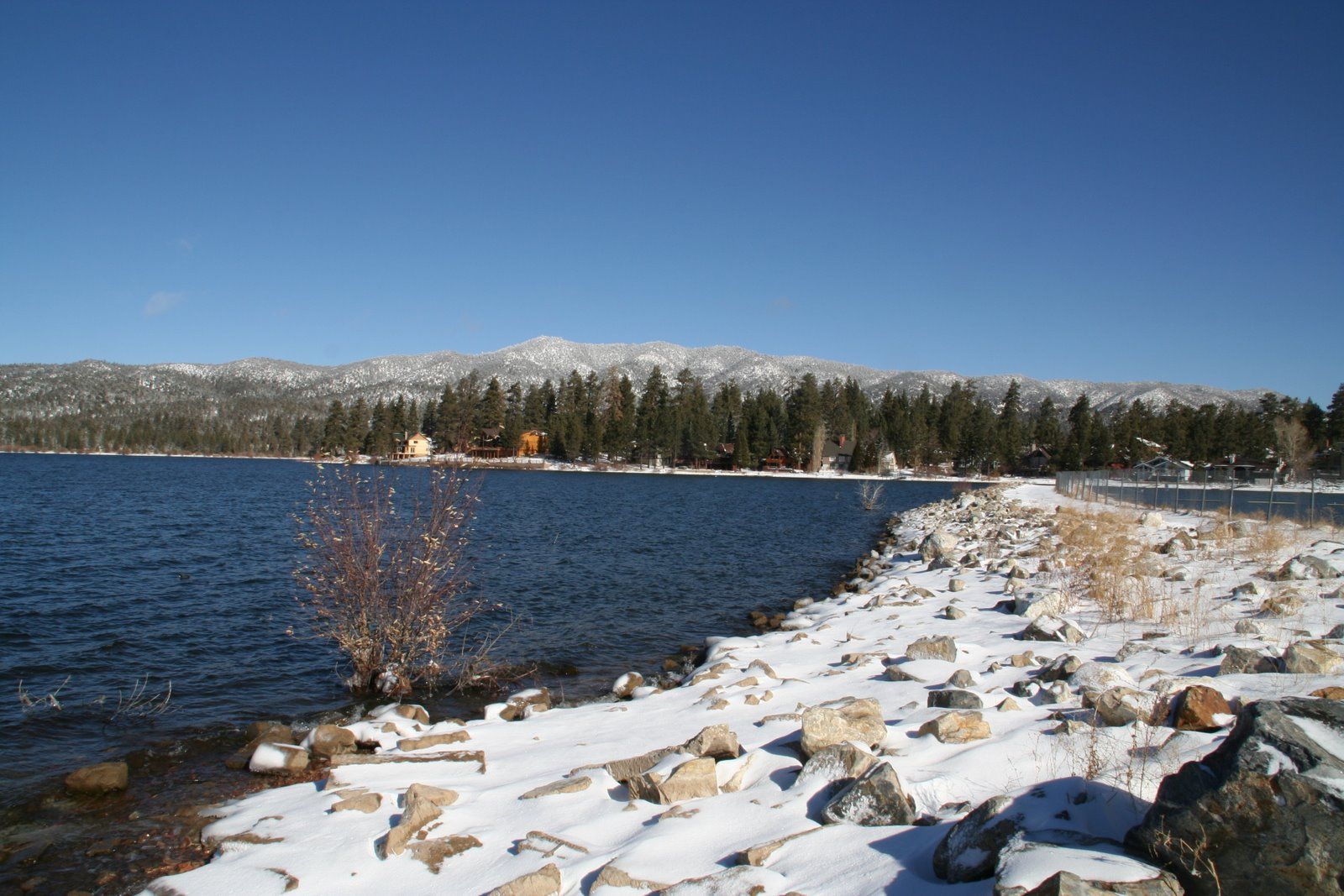
View from the village

The region has been the ancestral home of the indigenous Serrano people for approximately 2,500 years. They referred to the territory as "Yuhaviat" which translates into "Pine Place". They inhabited small villages of 10 to 30 round buildings located along fresh water sources and subsisted on berries, nuts, tubers, acorns, and plentiful game harvested along the lush valley. The Serrano looked at the native grizzly bears as ancestors and did not eat the meat or wear the fur of these massive animals. Several communities in the area feature place names reflecting the Big Bear region's rich Native history. These include Yucaipa, Cucamonga, and Muscupiabe.

European explorers first saw the area when a Native American hunting party was formed by Benjamin Wilson. Wilson moved to California during the days of Mexican territorial Alta California. He married into the Spanish landholder family, the Yorbas, and bought a portion of Rancho Jurupa (Riverside) from Juan Bandini. He became a local rancher statesman.

Wilson had signed on as Justice of the Peace of the Inland Territory and was commissioned by the territorial authorities to locate and pursue Native Americans suspected of raiding ranches in nearby Riverside. This group, led by the fierce Chief Walkara, drove the herd into the Lucerne Valley on the north side of the San Bernardinos. In 1845, Wilson gathered a posse of 44 men, 22 of whom he sent through the Cajon Pass while he engineered a pincer movement with the other 22 men into the headwaters of the Santa Ana River, effectively cutting the Utes off at the other end of Lucerne.

On the trip Wilson came upon a broad watershed teeming with wildlife, particularly bear. His posse immediately became a hunting party where the men were split into 11 pairs, each pair bringing back a bear hide. Wilson dubbed the grassy expanse "Bear Valley" and one of the nearby shallow seasonal marshes "Big Bear Lake". This same ephemeral feature is today called Baldwin Lake after Elias J. "Lucky" Baldwin of Rancho Santa Anita, who bought the nearby Gold Mountain Mine that was renamed for him in 1876. On Wilson's return trip, the party took 11 more bear pelts.

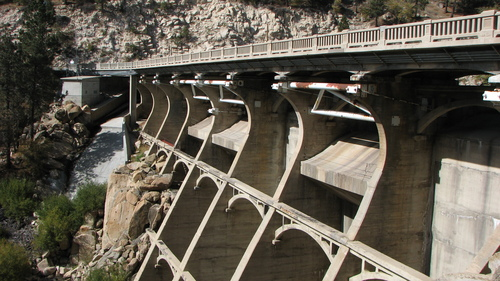
Bear Valley Dam

In 1859, the valley became a venue for gold prospectors. William F. Holcomb, a prospector from Indiana, moved to Los Angeles from the Northern California mines where he heard about the prospecting at Big Bear. He moved to Starvation Flats, where he had little luck the first winter. Because of his marksmanship, he was hired by several of the other miners to hunt bear for meat. With his Indian companion, Holcomb tracked, shot and wounded a grizzly bear one ridge north of Bear Valley. There he noticed a vein of quartz flecked with gold. When this discovery was revealed, the Southern California gold rush was on, and Holcomb Valley quickly became the largest populated area in San Bernardino County.

In 1884 marshy, nearly flat Bear Valley was dammed with a single arch granite impoundment, which held back some 25,000 acre-feet (31,000 dam^{3}) of water for irrigation purposes in the Redlands area. Redlands citrus growers found that the 1884 dam produced insufficient water. The Bear Valley Mutual Water Company (successor to Bear Valley Irrigation Company) hired John S. Eastwood to design a new dam. In 1912 (114 years ago) a 72 ft (22 m) multiple arch dam was constructed about 300 ft (91 m) downstream of the old dam and increased the lake capacity to 73,000 acre-feet (90,000 dam^{3}). The original granite dam still remains, usually under about 20 feet of water. A highway bridge (SR 18) was built over the arches of the new dam in 1923. A new bypass bridge was built next to the old bridge in 2009, and the old bridge on top of the new dam was removed. Elevation at the surface is 6,750 ft (2,060 m), but this level fluctuates according to annual snowmelt and runoff. Big Bear Municipal Water District acquired the dam and other assets from the Mutual Water Company in 1977.

The unregulated hunting of grizzly bear in the San Bernardinos took a heavy toll upon the once significant population, and by 1906 all the local Ursus arctos californicus were killed off.

Tourism began with the onset of the automobile and the eventual establishment of highways accessing the remote area. Hollywood soon discovered Big Bear, and several movies, particularly westerns, have been filmed in the region.

== Geography ==
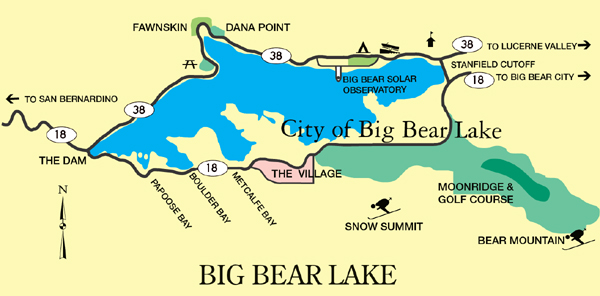

Big Bear Lake is geophysically defined by its North and South Shore. Big Bear Boulevard follows the South Shore and leads into the Big Bear Valley as a continuation of Highway 18 (the so-called Rim of the World Highway, which approaches from the west). Big Bear Boulevard winds east through Papoose Bay, Boulder Bay and Metcalf Bay, then leads directly east to the city of Big Bear Lake. At a point called The Village, the road turns toward the lake and then curves eastward to Moonridge, the ski resorts at Snow Summit and Bear Mountain, and Stanfield Cutoff, a causeway located near the east end of the lake. Big Bear Boulevard then continues east into Big Bear City, which is an unincorporated community despite its name. Bear Creek and Siberia Creek flow into the lake and Bear Creek flows out of the lake, traveling about 9 miles (14 km) southwest to the Santa Ana River.

North Shore (Highway 38) begins at the Dam Junction of Highway 18. It travels east past the historic location of Gray's Landing, a famous 1920s fishing camp. It turns north around Grout Bay and travels through the small unincorporated town of Fawnskin. The road meanders across North Shore through Forestry lands, past the Big Bear Solar Observatory, past the Big Bear Discovery Center, past the Serrano Campground (U.S.F.S), accessing the public boat launch, and Stanfield Cutoff. North Shore Drive continues east into Big Bear City and Baldwin Lake.

The primary approach to Big Bear is via Highway 330 out of San Bernardino through Running Springs where it intersects Highway 18. Highway 18 proceeds past Arrowbear and Snow Valley, over 7,200 ft (2,190 m) Lake Vista Summit and across the 15 mi (24 km) "Arctic Circle" for a total distance of 33 mi (53 km). Big Bear Lake can also be accessed by Hwy 38 (referred to as 'The Backside') at the San Bernardino (10) Freeway near Redlands, and takes a 52 mi (84 km) mile route that passes through Big Bear City on the east. From north of Lucerne Valley, it can be accessed by Highway 18 over the pass into Baldwin Lake and through the north side, into Big Bear City.

=== Climate ===
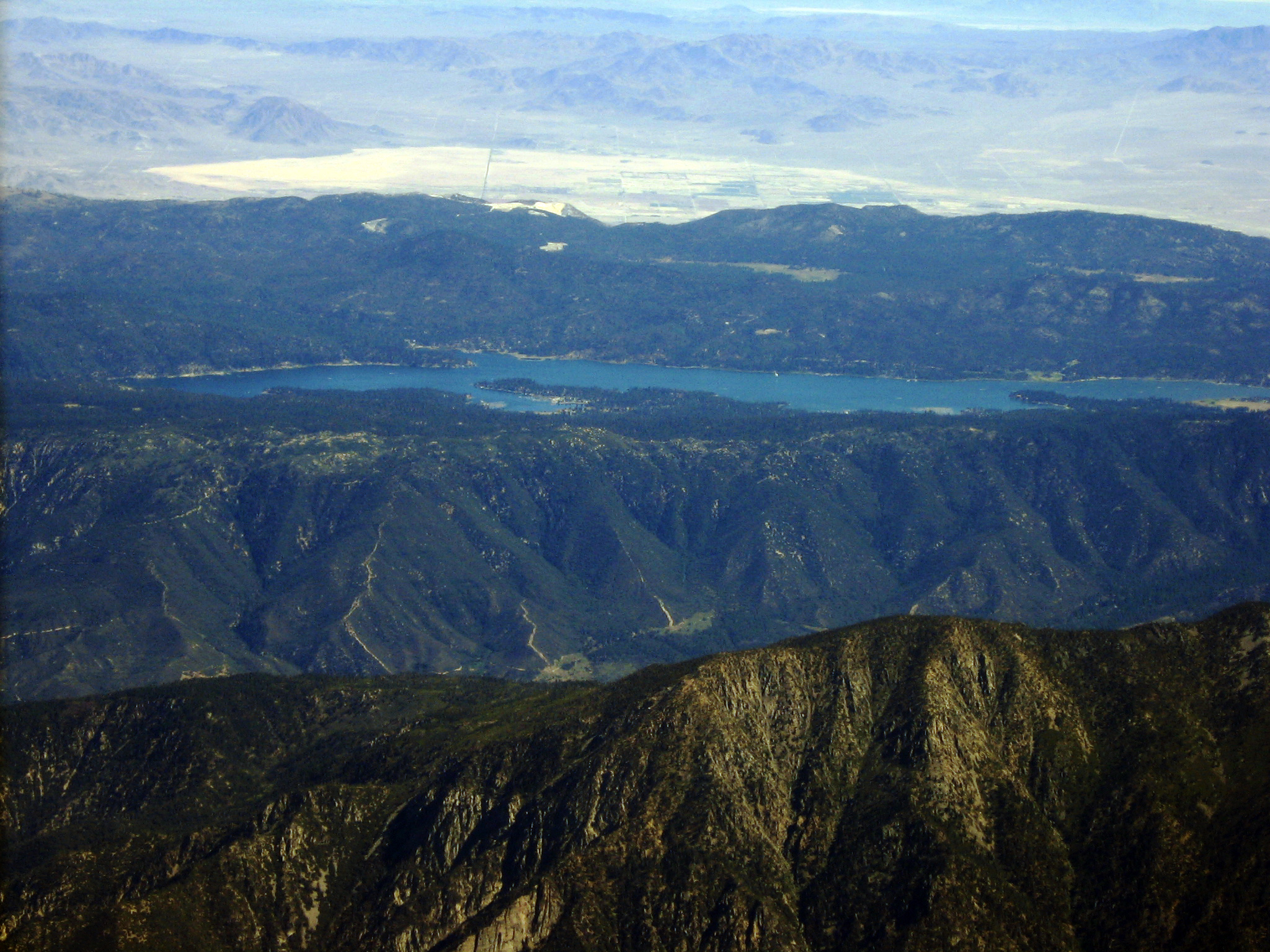
Big Bear Lake in the San Bernardino Mountains, with Lucerne Dry Lake visible in the Mojave Desert beyond, seen from an airliner on approach to Los Angeles

According to the National Weather Service, the warmest month at Big Bear is July, with a daily average temperature of 64.7 °F (18.2 °C). The coolest month is January, with a daily average temperature of 34.1 °F (1.2 °C). There are an average of 1.7 days each year with highs of 90 °F (32 °C) or higher. Freezing temperatures have occurred in every month and occur on an average of 186 days each year, on average from September 24 to June 4. With a period of record dating only back to 1960, the highest temperature recorded was 94 °F (34 °C), last recorded on July 15, 1998, while lowest was −25 °F (−32 °C) on January 29, 1979.

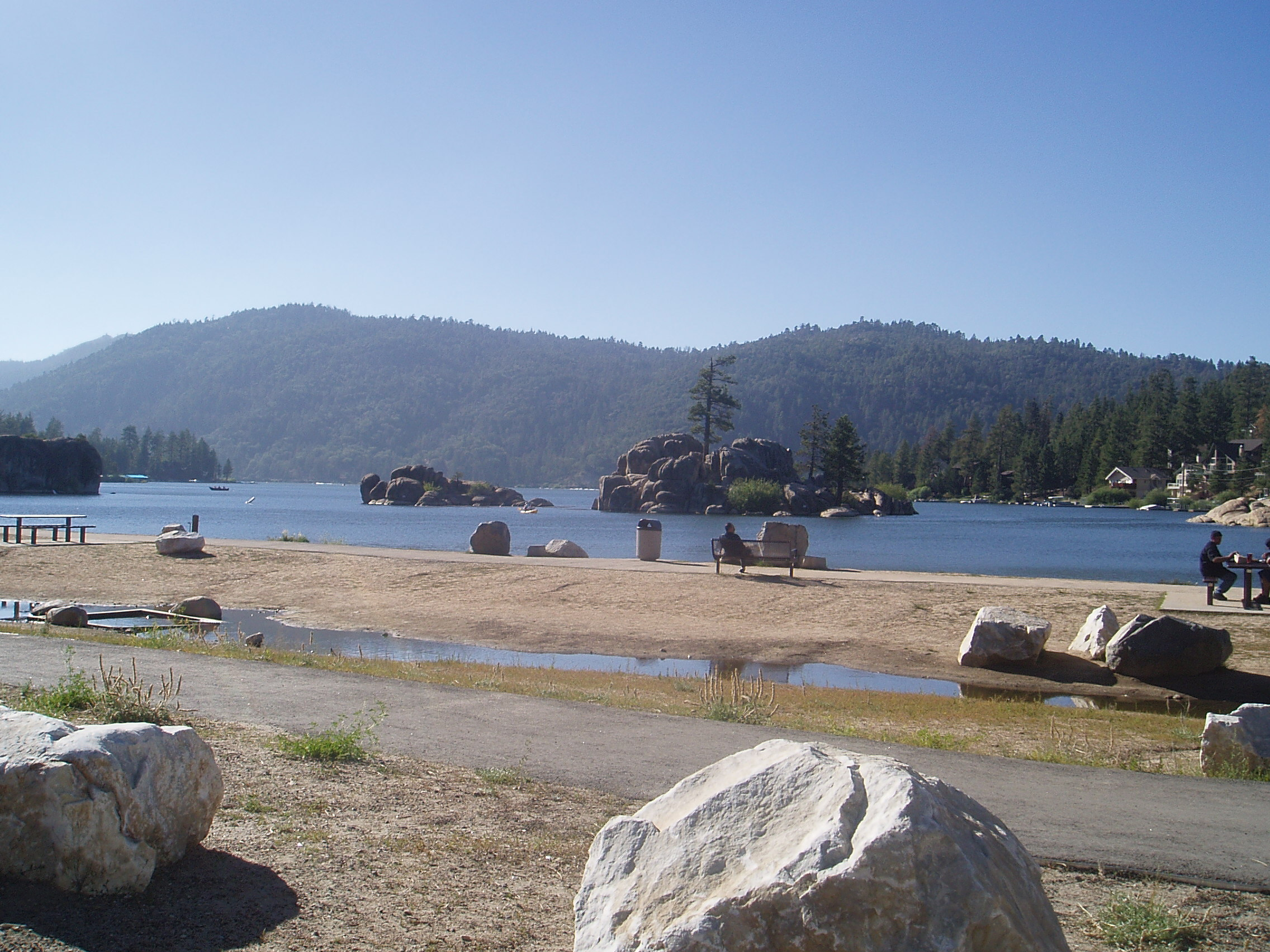
View from Boulder Bay Park

Due to the 6,790 to 7,200 ft (2,070 to 2,190 m) elevation of the weather station, precipitation is greater than in the lowlands of San Bernardino County, averaging 21.15 in (537 mm) a year. The maximum 24-hour precipitation was 9.43 in (240 mm) on December 6, 1966. Measurable precipitation normally occurs 44.9 days a year. Mountain thunderstorms occasionally produce heavy rainfall, even in midsummer (when most southern California lowland locations are quite dry). Big Bear Lake has a Mediterranean climate (Csb) bordering on a humid continental climate (Dsb) under the Köppen climate classification.

In contrast to most of southern California, the Big Bear Lake region normally receives significant winter snow because of its high elevation. Snowfall, as measured at lake level, averages 72 in (180 cm) per season; upwards of 100 in (250 cm) can accumulate on the forested ridges bordering the lake, at elevation above 8,000 ft (2,400 m). In February 1990, 59.5 in (151 cm) of snow were recorded. The most snow in 24 hours was 27.0 in (69 cm) on March 27, 1991. The greatest snow depth was 58 in (150 cm) on February 3, 1979. Snow has fallen in every month except July and August. There are normally 18 days each year with measurable snow of .1 in (0.25 cm) or more.

Climate data for Big Bear Lake, California, (1991–2020 normals, extremes 1914–present)
Month	Jan	Feb	Mar	Apr	May	Jun	Jul	Aug	Sep	Oct	Nov	Dec	Year
Record high °F (°C)	71 (22)	72 (22)	80 (27)	82 (28)	87 (31)	98 (37)	94 (34)	93 (34)	90 (32)	85 (29)	74 (23)	72 (22)	98 (37)
Mean maximum °F (°C)	60.1 (15.6)	60.3 (15.7)	65.1 (18.4)	72.2 (22.3)	78.4 (25.8)	85.8 (29.9)	88.7 (31.5)	86.5 (30.3)	82.1 (27.8)	75.5 (24.2)	68.3 (20.2)	61.8 (16.6)	89.8 (32.1)
Mean daily maximum °F (°C)	46.1 (7.8)	45.7 (7.6)	51.2 (10.7)	57.3 (14.1)	65.8 (18.8)	75.1 (23.9)	79.7 (26.5)	78.7 (25.9)	73.0 (22.8)	63.4 (17.4)	53.5 (11.9)	46.2 (7.9)	61.3 (16.3)
Daily mean °F (°C)	34.3 (1.3)	34.3 (1.3)	38.9 (3.8)	44.1 (6.7)	51.3 (10.7)	59.3 (15.2)	65.1 (18.4)	64.1 (17.8)	58.5 (14.7)	49.0 (9.4)	40.4 (4.7)	34.3 (1.3)	47.8 (8.8)
Mean daily minimum °F (°C)	22.7 (−5.2)	22.9 (−5.1)	26.5 (−3.1)	30.8 (−0.7)	36.8 (2.7)	43.5 (6.4)	50.5 (10.3)	49.5 (9.7)	44.0 (6.7)	34.6 (1.4)	27.4 (−2.6)	22.6 (−5.2)	34.3 (1.3)
Mean minimum °F (°C)	8.8 (−12.9)	9.8 (−12.3)	14.1 (−9.9)	20.1 (−6.6)	27.0 (−2.8)	33.4 (0.8)	40.8 (4.9)	40.0 (4.4)	32.5 (0.3)	24.5 (−4.2)	15.4 (−9.2)	10.1 (−12.2)	4.9 (−15.1)
Record low °F (°C)	−25 (−32)	−16 (−27)	−12 (−24)	−7 (−22)	15 (−9)	22 (−6)	28 (−2)	28 (−2)	19 (−7)	10 (−12)	−15 (−26)	−14 (−26)	−25 (−32)
Average precipitation inches (mm)	4.51 (115)	4.39 (112)	2.37 (60)	0.78 (20)	0.42 (11)	0.15 (3.8)	0.69 (18)	0.82 (21)	0.40 (10)	0.79 (20)	1.35 (34)	3.31 (84)	19.98 (508.8)
Average snowfall inches (cm)	13.4 (34)	14.3 (36)	11.7 (30)	3.0 (7.6)	0.6 (1.5)	0.0 (0.0)	0.0 (0.0)	0.0 (0.0)	0.0 (0.0)	1.2 (3.0)	3.4 (8.6)	11.0 (28)	58.6 (148.7)
Average precipitation days (≥ 0.01 in)	6.6	6.8	5.5	3.7	2.0	0.7	2.6	2.8	2.0	2.2	2.9	5.5	43.3
Average snowy days (≥ 0.1 in)	3.5	3.5	2.7	1.2	0.3	0.1	0.0	0.0	0.0	0.3	1.1	3.3	16.0
Source: NOAA

== Transportation ==
Located 100 miles (160 km) east of Los Angeles and surrounded by the San Bernardino National Forest, Big Bear Lake is accessible via three scenic highways: Highway 330 from San Bernardino, Highway 38 from Redlands, and Highway 18 from Victorville to the west, San Bernardino to the east.

Public transit to and from San Bernardino, and among the communities surrounding the lake are provided by Mountain Transit.

== Activities ==
Big Bear Lake provides an attractive setting for many outdoor activities, including fishing (trout, bluegill, crappie, catfish and largemouth bass), pleasure boating, and water skiing. Because of the very cold water and the presence of underwater obstacles near the shorelines, swimming is discouraged. The lake is patrolled by the BBMWD Lake Patrol.

Many lakeside residents have private docks, and visiting boaters obtain mooring in several of the marinas found on both shores. Big Bear Municipal Water District (a special district of the State of California) provides public launches on the east end and west end of North Shore. Local marinas rent various sport and pleasure boats, and parasailing is available.

The California Office of Environmental Health Hazard Assessment (OEHHA) has developed an advisory for Big Bear Lake because of mercury and PCBs found in fish caught here. The advisory provides safe eating advice for black bass species, common carp, crappie, and rainbow trout.

== Points of interest ==
North Shore (west to east)

- Fawnskin (San Bernardino County uninc.)
- Big Bear Solar Observatory (New Jersey Institute of Technology)
- Big Bear Discovery Center

South Shore (west to east)

- Snow Summit (skiing; snowboarding; mountain biking in summer; ski lift open in summer for sightseeing)
- Bear Mountain (skiing and snowboarding in winter; golf course in summer)

== California Historical Landmark ==
California Historical Landmark at the Big Bear Dam reads:

- NO. 725 OLD BEAR VALLEY DAM - In 1884 Frank Brown built an unusual dam here to supply irrigation water for the Redlands area. The single-arch granite dam formed Big Bear Lake, then the world's largest man-made lake. Engineers claimed the dam would not hold, and declared it "The Eighth Wonder of the World" when it did. The old dam is usually underwater because of the 20-foot higher dam built 200 feet west in 1912.

The Bear Valley Dams were also designated as a Local Historic Civil Engineering Landmark by the American Society of Civil Engineers in 1972.

== See also ==
- Big Bear City, California, an unincorporated town east of Big Bear Lake
  - List of people from Big Bear Lake, California
- California Historical Landmarks in San Bernardino County, California
- List of dams and reservoirs in California
- List of lakes in California
- The Trail of the Lonesome Pine, a 1936 film, much of which was shot at Big Bear Lake
