= Starvation (glaciology) =

When a glacier retreats due to extremely low amounts of precipitation

In glaciology, starvation occurs when a glacier retreats, not because of temperature increases, but due to precipitation so low that the ice flow downward into the zone of ablation exceeds the replenishment from snowfall. Eventually, the ice will move so far down that it either calves into the ocean or melts.

When starvation does occur, however, it can almost always be reversed by slight changes in precipitation, such as are brought about by mountain ranges. Thus, even if glaciers do not cover a lowland due to low precipitation, glaciation is almost certain to occur at higher elevations.

== Occurrences ==
Starvation of continental ice sheets is known to have occurred during the period before the Last Glacial Maximum in many areas of Canada and the West Siberian Plain.

It is thought that, after the end of the Eemian Stage, continental ice sheets first formed near or beyond their northern margins (that is, in the extreme northwest of Siberia and the Yukon Territory, Northwest Territories and Nunavut in North America). However, as an ice sheet advances, precipitation at its centre (known as a dome) tends to become very low because high-pressure systems form due to the very cold temperatures above the ice. This meant that at the northern edge of the ice sheets, there was almost no replenishment of the ice, and as it fell to lower elevations, even if it did not melt, it was not being replaced.

Thus, as the continental ice sheets of Quaternary glaciations advanced south according to each Milankovitch cycle, their northern edges were starved and it is believed that starvation caused them to retreat substantially southward by the time the southern limits of maximum glaciation were approached. In areas such as the Russian Far East, eastern Siberia and Beringia, glaciers were, in effect, starved before they could form at all.

Some have also argued that starvation, as well as increasing temperatures, played a significant role in the decay of continental ice sheets after the LGM. The argument is that as fresh water from the melting edges of the ice sheet reached the sea, the flow of warm water which fed the ice sheets was stopped and deglaciation during the summer accelerated. This is considered a highly controversial position.

Starvation of glaciers is believed to have occurred during the Little Ice Age in parts of Alaska, the Himalayas and the Karakoram. This is because these glaciers do not follow the general global patterns of glacial advance during warm periods and retreat during cold periods, which would imply that their size is controlled by the amount of precipitation they receive (because temperatures are so low that the increases deemed from global warming, for example, would fail to melt them to any degree whatsoever).
