= Optical train =

System of optical components to redirect beams of light

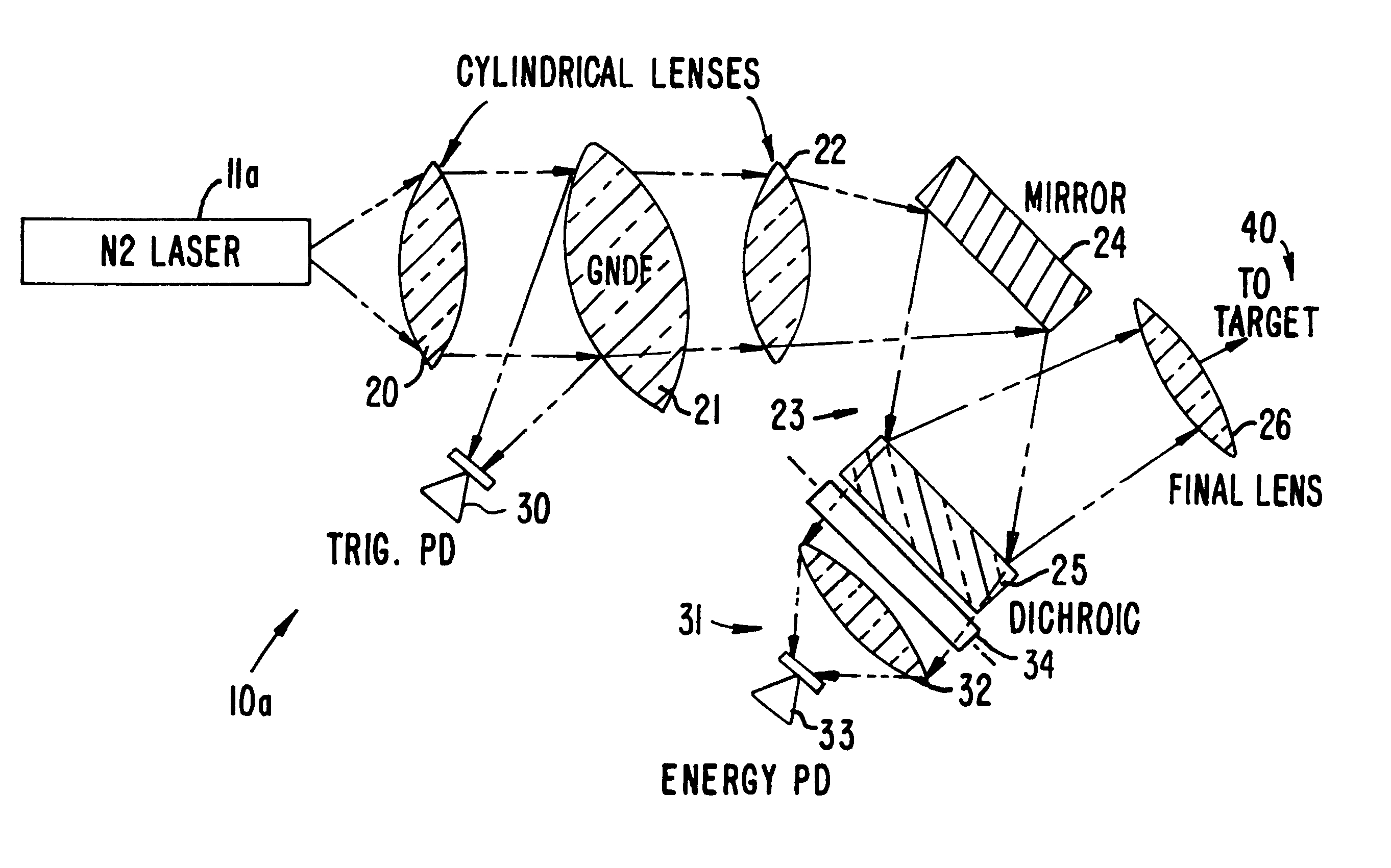
An optical train showing the arrangement and angle of lenses and mirrors to guide the laser

An optical train, also called an optical assembly, is an arrangement of optical components (e.g. lenses, mirrors, prisms) to guide a line of sight and/or a laser beam. For example, the position and angle of lenses may be adjusted to guide a laser through the path required. Optical instruments like microscopes, telescopes, and DSLRs all have optical trains that guide the incoming light towards a detector or the eye of an observer. The optical train of a telescope is commonly called an optical tube assembly (OTA) or simply an optical tube.

== See also ==
- Optical path
