= List of people from Big Bear Lake, California =

This is a list of notable people who were born in, or who have lived in, Big Bear Lake, California.

- Mel Blanc – voice of Bugs Bunny
- Noel Blanc – voice actor
- Ryan Hall – long distance Olympic runner
- Ralph Hodges – child actor
- Shirley Jones – actor
- Taran Killam – actor from Saturday Night Live, Wild 'n Out, MADtv
- Brenda Martinez – track and field athlete
- Ed Masuga – singer, musician, and songwriter
- Richard Moll – actor from Night Court
- Kevin Costner– actor
- Richard Karn – actor from Home Improvement (TV series)
- Jordan Romero – mountain climber who climbed all 7 summits by the age of 15
- Demetri Terzopoulos– computer scientist
- Richard Rush (director)– film director
- Michael Thomas Radford baseball player

== See also ==
- Big Bear City, California, an unincorporated town east of Big Bear Lake
- Big Bear Lake, California, for the incorporated city
