= Lucerne Lake (California) =

Lake in the state of California, United States

- Location within California Location within the United States
- Location: Mojave Desert; San Bernardino County, California
- Coordinates: 34°30′15″N 116°57′15″W
- Lake type: Endorheic basin
- Primary outflows: Terminal (evaporation)
- Basin countries: United States
- Max. length: 6 km (3.7 mi)
- Max. width: 8 km (5.0 mi)
- Shore length^{1}: 25 km (16 mi)
- Surface elevation: 869 m (2,851 ft)
- References: U.S. Geological Survey Geographic Names Information System: Lucerne Lake
- ^{1} Shore length is not a well-defined measure.

Lucerne Lake is a dry lake bed in the Mojave Desert of San Bernardino County, California, 24 km (15 mi) east of Apple Valley. The lake is approximately 6 km (3.7 mi) long and 8 km (5.0 mi) at its widest point.

== See also ==
- List of lakes in California
