= Starvation Flats =

Coordinates: 34°18′10″N 116°53′46″W

Starvation Flats is an area in the San Bernardino Mountains near Big Bear Lake, California. It was originally a settlement of the Native American Serrano people for thousands of years.

== History ==
Starvation Flats was an open mountain plain with occasional grizzly bears. In 1845, Don Benito Wilson and 22 other men rode into the area in search of rustlers, but found only bears. In the years following, homesteaders came into the region to stake their claims. However, due to the poor soil and continuously bad crops, they found continuous trouble living there.

Eventually, they enlisted William F. Holcomb, who was widely known as "the best sharpshooter west of the Mississippi", to exterminate the grizzly bears. He was successful in his extermination, and so creating safety for the new homesteaders. He eventually went on to discover gold and found Holcomb Valley.

== See also ==
- California Gold Rush
- Holcomb Valley
