= Holcomb Valley =

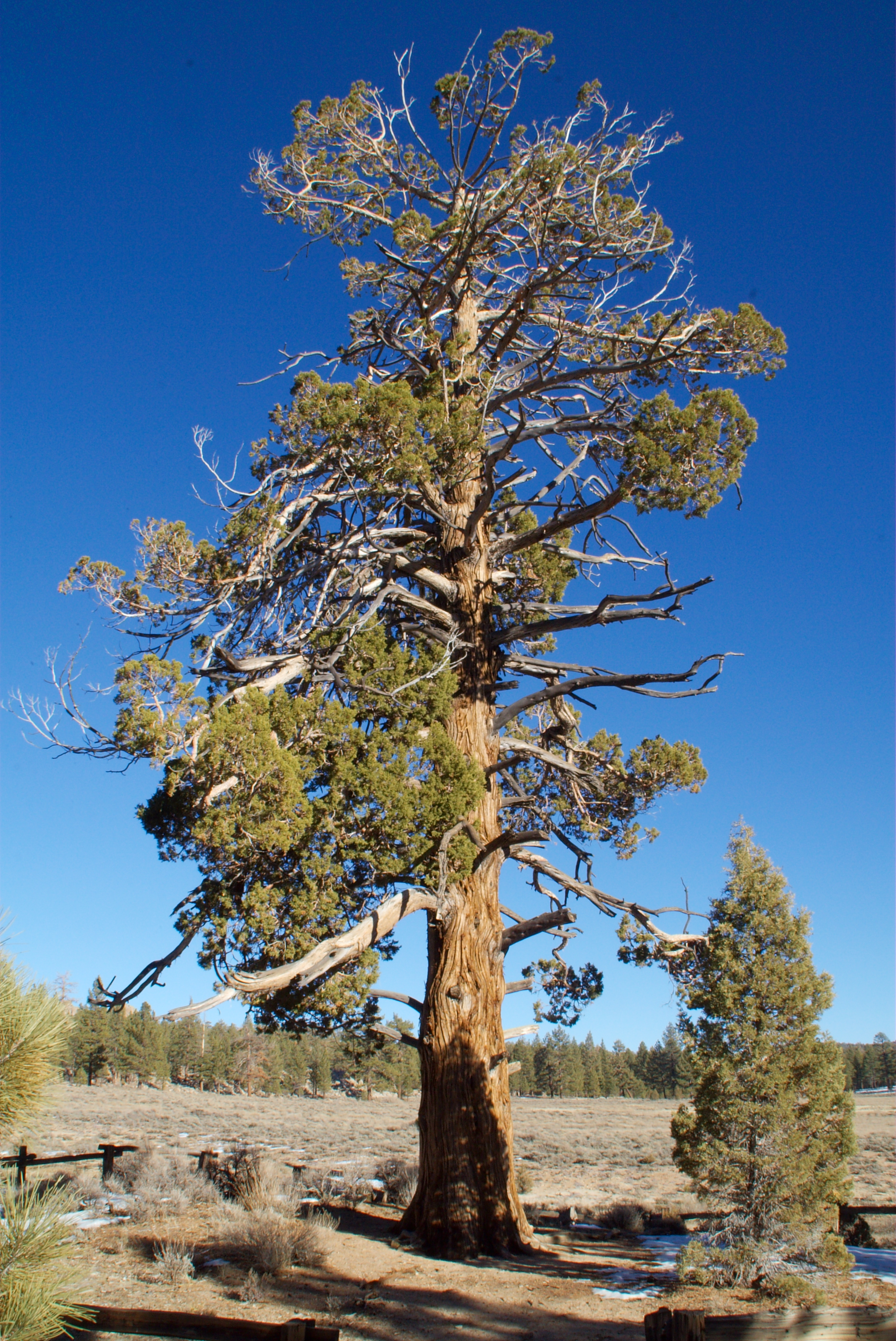
- Hangman's Tree, where frontier justice was dispensed

- Location within California
- 34.3028°N 116.8960°W

California Historical Landmark
- Reference no.: 619

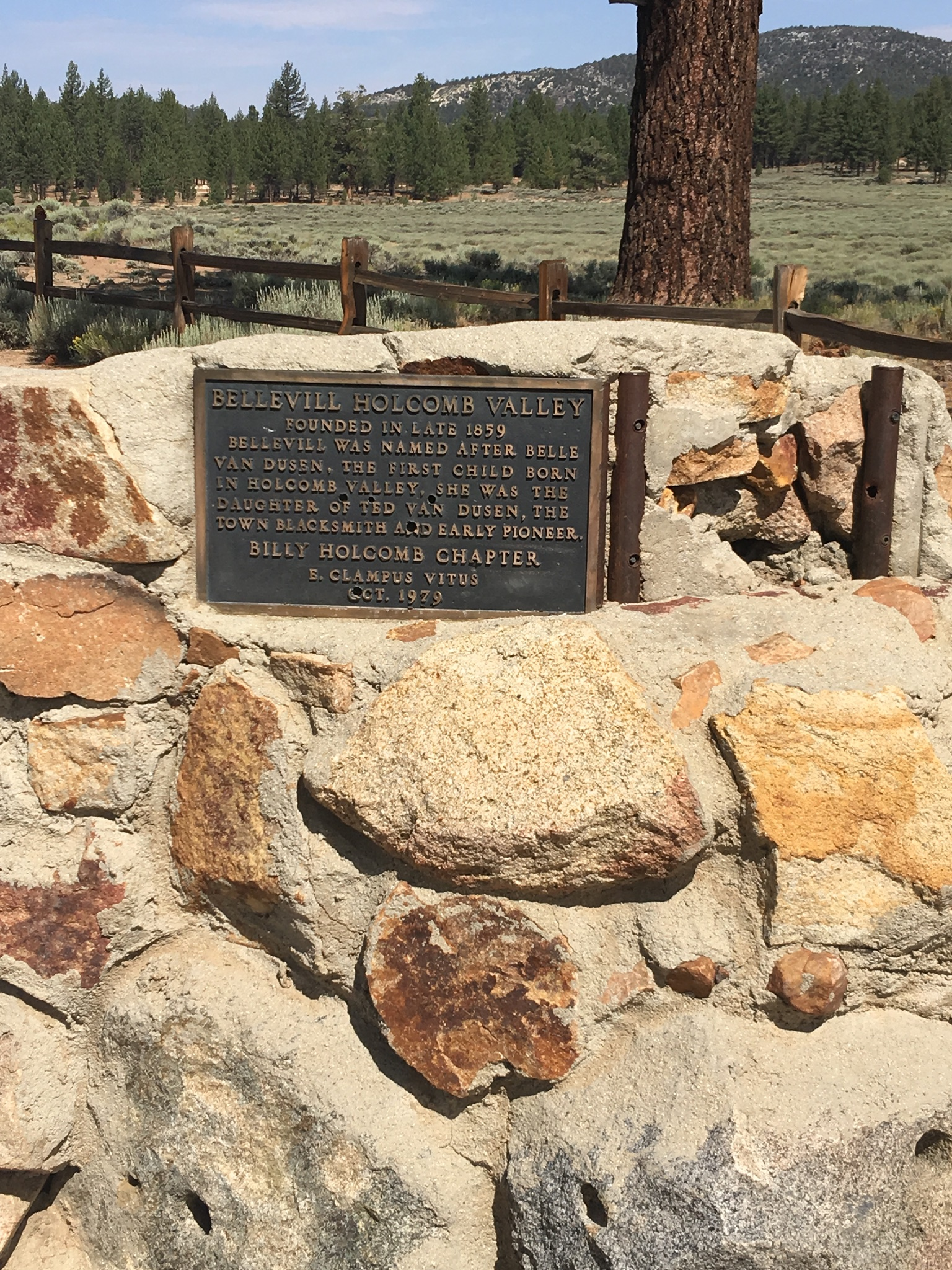
Holcomb Valley Marker

Holcomb Valley is a valley located in the San Bernardino Mountains about 5 miles (8 km) north of Big Bear Lake. It was the site of some of the most prolific gold mines in Southern California. It was named after William F. Holcomb, who found gold there in 1860. Holcomb's discovery spurred the largest gold rush in the Southern California region. The boomtown of Belleville was founded near there and flourished for about ten years before being abandoned. The site is now registered as California Historical Landmark #619.

== Gold ==
In May 1860, gold was found there by William F. Holcomb and Ben Choteau. They were miners who had been prospecting at Bear Valley. Holcomb found gold while he was tracking a bear in the valley later named after him. After Holcomb and Ben Ware filed mine claims on five sites in May 1860 at the County Recorder's office, word spread quickly and prospectors rushed to the area.

Before long, a gold camp sprang up within 150 inches (380 cm) of where the gold was found. It became a town and, after the first child Belle was born, the new town was named Belleville in her honor. It soon became the largest town in San Bernardino County with a population of about 1,500.

A popular local myth is that Belleville was almost once the County seat. The story goes that Belleville residents felt they deserved the honor of being the county seat and placed this measure on the ballot in either 1860 or 1861. After the election, ballots were being counted at the County Court House in San Bernardino around an open bonfire when one of the ballot boxes, allegedly from Belleville, was accidentally kicked into the fire and destroyed. When the count was completed, Belleville had lost the county seat election by a slim margin of two votes.

However, the California Constitution allows for a change in county seat only through legislative action in which it may directly decide the location, or delegate the authority to the voters of the county, which would require it to be placed on the local ballot. There was no legislative act on record in State Records to change the county seat from San Bernardino to Belleville, in any year, let alone 1860 or 1861. Any item up for election on the local ballot was required to be posted in the local newspaper. The only items published in both 1860 and 1861 were the names of the people running for office and school bonds. The items up for election are also required to be listed in the Board of Supervisor minutes, there is no such listing for the change of the County seat. There is also no mention of the election or missing ballots in Holcomb's recollections which were written in the 1870s only a few years later at the behest of the San Bernardino Pioneer Society.

Because Belleville was a place filled with rough characters competing over gold, it was considered a place of violence and hanging justice. At its peak, it was the third largest town in Southern California.

Holcomb Valley produced the most wealth from gold of any Southern California mining district. With time, major placer and quartz mining declined, followed by the departure of most of the population of Belleville after 1870. Hard rock mining continued at the Gold Mountain Mine until 1919. Some mining activity continues today, with 2,000 claims by hobbyists.

The valley was the site of the Holcomb Valley Scout Camp, which operated from 1974 to 2016 on the site of the old Hitchcock Ranch. The property was sold in 2019 and is now a private retreat and campground.

== See also ==
- California gold rush
- The Night of the Grizzly
- California Historical Landmarks in San Bernardino County
