= Choice 2000 =

Online charter school in California, USA

Information
- Established: 1994
- Closed: 2014
- Grades: 9-12

Choice 2000 on-line School was California's 64 Charter school. Its real-time online service was provided to students in grades 9–12 in the southern California area.

== History ==
The original concept of this charter school was developed by Michael T. Allen in 1994. Under the California State rules, it received signatures of at least 50% of the teachers of the Perris Lake Continuation School and was submitted to Superintendent Stephen Thiel, and Asst. Superintendents Judy Smith and Donald Sauter. It was submitted and accepted by the California Department of Education in July 1994. It is located in the Perris Union High School District, in Perris, California. It is currently under School District management.

== Closure ==
In 2014, Choice 2000 On-Line closed its virtual doors and shut down.
