= California's 39th congressional district =

U.S. House district for California

Coordinates: 33°56′25″N 117°50′06″W

- Interactive map of district boundaries
- Representative: Mark Takano; D–Riverside
- Population (2025): 786,987
- Median household income: $94,026
- Ethnicity: 62.3% Hispanic; 19.5% White; 8.4% Black; 5.8% Asian; 2.8% Two or more races; 1.2% other
- Cook PVI: D+7

California's 39th congressional district is a congressional district in the U.S. state of California. The district includes parts of Riverside County, including Jurupa Valley, Riverside, Moreno Valley, and Perris. The district has been represented by Democrat Mark Takano ever since he was redistricted from the 41st congressional district in 2022.

== Recent election results from statewide races ==
=== 2023–2027 boundaries ===
Year	Office	Results
2008	President	Obama 61% - 39%
2010	Governor	Brown 53% - 40%
2010	Lt. Governor	Newsom 49% - 37%
2010	Secretary of State	Bowen 52% - 39%
2010	Attorney General	Cooley 46% - 45%
2010	Treasurer	Lockyer 57% - 36%
2010	Controller	Chiang 52% - 38%
2012	President	Obama 63% - 37%
2014	Governor	Brown 55% - 45%
2016	President	Clinton 61% - 33%
2018	Governor	Newsom 60% - 40%
2018	Attorney General	Becerra 62% - 38%
2020	President	Biden 62% - 36%
2022	Senate (Reg.)	Padilla 56% - 44%
2022	Governor	Newsom 55% - 45%
2022	Lt. Governor	Kounalakis 55% - 45%
2022	Secretary of State	Weber 56% - 44%
2022	Attorney General	Bonta 55% - 45%
2022	Treasurer	Ma 54% - 46%
2022	Controller	Cohen 54% - 46%
2024	President	Harris 53% - 44%
2024	Senate (Reg.)	Schiff 55% - 45%

=== 2027–2033 boundaries ===
Year	Office	Results
2008	President	Obama 61% - 39%
2010	Governor	Brown 53% - 40%
2010	Lt. Governor	Newsom 49% - 37%
2010	Secretary of State	Bowen 52% - 39%
2010	Attorney General	Harris 46% - 45%
2010	Treasurer	Lockyer 57% - 36%
2010	Controller	Chiang 52% - 38%
2012	President	Obama 63% - 37%
2014	Governor	Brown 55% - 45%
2016	President	Clinton 61% - 33%
2018	Governor	Newsom 60% - 40%
2018	Attorney General	Becerra 62% - 38%
2020	President	Biden 62% - 36%
2022	Senate (Reg.)	Padilla 56% - 44%
2022	Governor	Newsom 55% - 45%
2022	Lt. Governor	Kounalakis 55% - 45%
2022	Secretary of State	Weber 56% - 44%
2022	Attorney General	Bonta 55% - 45%
2022	Treasurer	Ma 54% - 46%
2022	Controller	Cohen 54% - 46%
2024	President	Harris 53% - 44%
2024	Senate (Reg.)	Schiff 55% - 45%

== Composition ==
FIPS County Code	County	Seat	Population
65	Riverside	Riverside	2,492,442

Under the 2020 redistricting, California's 39th congressional district was geographically shifted to the Inland Empire in Southern California, specifically within the northwestern region of Riverside County. It includes the cities of Moreno Valley, Jurupa Valley, Perris, and Riverside; and the census-designated places Mead Valley, Home Gardens, Highgrove, March Air Reserve Base, Good Hope, and Meadowbrook.

Riverside County is split between this district and the 41st district. They are partitioned by the Corona Freeway, River Trails Park, Redley Substation Rd, Arlington Ave, Alhambra Ave, Golden Ave, Doheny Blvd, Bolivar St, Campbell Ave, Pierce St, Quantico Dr, Collett Ave, Buchanan St, Highway 91, 12397 Doherty Way-Magnolia Ave, BNSF Railroad, N McKinley St, N Temescal St, E 16th St, S Neece St, Indiana Ave, Skyridge Dr, Fillmore St, 2969 Fillmore St-La Sierra Ave, Cleveland Ave, McAllister Parkway, Corsica Ave, Hermosa Dr, John F. Kennedy Dr, Wood Rd, Colt St, Dauchy Ave, Van Buren Blvd, Bobbit Ave, Chicago Ave, Krameria Ave, 16510 Sendero del Charro-Mariposa Ave, Barton St, Cole Ave, Rider St, Greenwood Ave, Kabian Park, Goetz Park, Ethanac Rd, McLaughlin Rd, Sherman Rd, Tumble Rd, Watson Rd, Escondido Expressway, Mapes Rd, Ellis Ave, Antelope Rd, Rico Ave, San Jacinto River, Ramona Expressway, Lake Perris State Recreation Area, Gilman Springs Rd, Moreno Valley Freeway, Quincy St, Cloud Haven Dr, Holly Ct, Reche Vista Dr, Reche Canyon Rd, and Keissel Rd.

=== Cities and CDPs with 10,000 or more people ===
- Riverside – 317,261
- Moreno Valley – 208,634
- Jurupa Valley – 105,053
- Perris – 80,263
- Mead Valley – 19,819
- Home Gardens – 11,203

=== 2,500 – 10,000 people ===
- Good Hope – 9,468
- Highgrove – 7,166
- Meadowbrook – 3,142

== List of members representing the district ==
Member	Party	Dates	Cong ress(es)	Electoral history	Counties
District created January 3, 1973
Andrew Hinshaw (Mission Viejo)	Republican	January 3, 1973 – January 3, 1975	93rd	Elected in 1972. Redistricted to the 40th district.	1973–1975; Inland Orange
Charles E. Wiggins (Fullerton)	Republican	January 3, 1975 – January 3, 1979	94th 95th	Redistricted from the 25th district and re-elected in 1974. Re-elected in 1976. Retired.	1975–1983; Northeastern Orange
William E. Dannemeyer (Fullerton)	Republican	January 3, 1979 – January 3, 1993	96th 97th 98th 99th 100th 101st 102nd	Elected in 1978. Re-elected in 1980. Re-elected in 1982. Re-elected in 1984. Re-elected in 1986. Re-elected in 1988. Re-elected in 1990. Retired to run for U.S. Senator.	1975–1983; Northeastern Orange
William E. Dannemeyer (Fullerton)	Republican	January 3, 1979 – January 3, 1993	96th 97th 98th 99th 100th 101st 102nd	Elected in 1978. Re-elected in 1980. Re-elected in 1982. Re-elected in 1984. Re-elected in 1986. Re-elected in 1988. Re-elected in 1990. Retired to run for U.S. Senator.	1983–1993; Northeastern Orange
Ed Royce (Fullerton)	Republican	January 3, 1993 – January 3, 2003	103rd 104th 105th 106th 107th	Elected in 1992. Re-elected in 1994. Re-elected in 1996. Re-elected in 1998. Re-elected in 2000. Redistricted to the 40th district.	1993–2003; Southern Los Angeles, Northwestern Orange
Linda Sánchez (Lakewood)	Democratic	January 3, 2003 – January 3, 2013	108th 109th 110th 111th 112th	Elected in 2002. Re-elected in 2004. Re-elected in 2006. Re-elected in 2008. Re-elected in 2010. Redistricted to the 38th district.	2003–2013 South/Southeastern Los Angeles
Ed Royce (Fullerton)	Republican	January 3, 2013 – January 3, 2019	113th 114th 115th	Redistricted from the 40th district and re-elected in 2012. Re-elected in 2014. Re-elected in 2016. Retired.	2013–2023 Parts of Los Angeles, Orange, San Bernardino (Chino Hills, Diamond Bar, and Fullerton)
Gil Cisneros (Placentia)	Democratic	January 3, 2019 – January 3, 2021	116th	Elected in 2018. Lost re-election.	2013–2023 Parts of Los Angeles, Orange, San Bernardino (Chino Hills, Diamond Bar, and Fullerton)
Young Kim (Fullerton)	Republican	January 3, 2021 – January 3, 2023	117th	Elected in 2020. Redistricted to the 40th district.	2013–2023 Parts of Los Angeles, Orange, San Bernardino (Chino Hills, Diamond Bar, and Fullerton)
Mark Takano (Riverside)	Democratic	January 3, 2023 – present	118th 119th	Redistricted from the 41st district and re-elected in 2022. Re-elected in 2024. Re-elected in 2026.	2023–present: Western Riverside County

== Election results ==
=== 1972 ===
1972 United States House of Representatives elections in California
Party	Candidate	Votes	%
Republican	Andrew J. Hinshaw	146,911	65.7
Democratic	John Woodland Black	76,695	43.3
Total votes		223,606	100.0
Republican hold			

=== 1974 ===
1974 United States House of Representatives elections in California
Party	Candidate	Votes	%
Republican	Charles E. Wiggins	87,995	55.2
Democratic	William E. "Bill" Farris	64,735	40.4
American Independent	Pat P. Scalera	6,967	4.4
Total votes		159,337	100.0
Republican hold			

=== 1976 ===
1976 United States House of Representatives elections in California
Party	Candidate	Votes	%
Republican	Charles E. Wiggins (Incumbent)	122,657	58.6
Democratic	William E. "Bill" Farris	86,745	41.4
Total votes		209,402	100.0
Republican hold			

=== 1978 ===
1978 United States House of Representatives elections in California
Party	Candidate	Votes	%
Republican	William E. Dannemeyer	112,160	63.7
Democratic	William E. Farris	63,891	36.3
Total votes		176,051	100.0
Republican hold			

=== 1980 ===
1980 United States House of Representatives elections in California
Party	Candidate	Votes	%
Republican	William E. Dannemeyer (Incumbent)	175,228	76.3
Democratic	Leonard L. Lahtinen	54,504	23.7
Total votes		229,732	100.0
Republican hold			

=== 1982 ===
1982 United States House of Representatives elections in California
Party	Candidate	Votes	%
Republican	William E. Dannemeyer (Incumbent)	129,539	72.2
Democratic	Frank G. Verges	46,681	26.0
Libertarian	Frank Boeheim	3,152	1.8
Total votes		179,372	100.0
Republican hold			

=== 1984 ===
1984 United States House of Representatives elections in California
Party	Candidate	Votes	%
Republican	William E. Dannemeyer (Incumbent)	175,788	76.2
Democratic	Robert E. Ward	54,889	23.8
Total votes		230,677	100.0
Republican hold			

=== 1986 ===
1986 United States House of Representatives elections in California
Party	Candidate	Votes	%
Republican	William E. Dannemeyer (Incumbent)	131,603	74.4
Democratic	David D. Vest	42,377	24.0
Peace and Freedom	Frank Boeheim	2,752	1.6
Total votes		176,732	100.0
Republican hold			

=== 1988 ===
1988 United States House of Representatives elections in California
Party	Candidate	Votes	%
Republican	William E. Dannemeyer (Incumbent)	169,360	74.0
Democratic	Don E. Marquis	52,162	22.7
Libertarian	Lee Connelly	7,470	3.3
Write-in		367	0.0
Total votes		229,359	100.0
Republican hold			

=== 1990 ===
1990 United States House of Representatives elections in California
Party	Candidate	Votes	%
Republican	William E. Dannemeyer (Incumbent)	113,849	65.3
Democratic	Francis X. "Frank" Hoffman	53,670	30.8
Peace and Freedom	Maxine Bell Quirk	6,709	3.9
Total votes		174,228	100.0
Republican hold			

=== 1992 ===
1992 United States House of Representatives elections in California
Party	Candidate	Votes	%
Republican	Ed Royce	122,472	57.2
Democratic	Molly McClanahan	81,728	38.5
Libertarian	Jack Dean	9,484	4.3
Total votes		213,684	100.0
Republican hold			

=== 1994 ===
1994 United States House of Representatives elections in California
Party	Candidate	Votes	%
Republican	Ed Royce (Incumbent)	113,641	66.4
Democratic	R. O. "Bob" Davis	49,696	29.0
Libertarian	Jack Dean	7,907	4.6
Total votes		171,244	100.0
Republican hold			

=== 1996 ===
1996 United States House of Representatives elections in California
Party	Candidate	Votes	%
Republican	Ed Royce (Incumbent)	120,761	62.9
Democratic	Robert Davis	61,392	31.9
Libertarian	Jack Dean	10,137	5.2
Total votes		192,290	100.0
Republican hold			

=== 1998 ===
1998 United States House of Representatives elections in California
Party	Candidate	Votes	%
Republican	Ed Royce (Incumbent)	97,366	62.6
Democratic	A. "Cecy" R. Groom	52,815	34.0
Libertarian	Jack Dean	3,347	2.2
Natural Law	Ron Jevning	1,937	1.2
Total votes		155,465	100.0
Republican hold			

=== 2000 ===
2000 United States House of Representatives elections in California
Party	Candidate	Votes	%
Republican	Ed Royce (Incumbent)	129,294	62.8
Democratic	Gill G. Kanel	64,938	31.5
Natural Law	Ron Jevning	6,597	3.2
Libertarian	Keith D. Gann	5,275	2.5
Total votes		206,104	100.0
Republican hold			

=== 2002 ===
2002 United States House of Representatives elections in California
Party	Candidate	Votes	%
Democratic	Linda Sánchez	52,256	54.9
Republican	Tim Escobar	38,925	40.8
Libertarian	Richard G. Newhouse	4,165	4.3
Total votes		95,346	100.0
Democratic gain from Republican			

=== 2004 ===
2004 United States House of Representatives elections in California
Party	Candidate	Votes	%
Democratic	Linda Sánchez (Incumbent)	100,132	60.7
Republican	Tim Escobar	64,832	39.3
Total votes		164,964	100.0
Democratic hold			

=== 2006 ===
2006 United States House of Representatives elections in California
Party	Candidate	Votes	%
Democratic	Linda Sánchez (Incumbent)	72,149	65.9
Republican	James L. Andion	37,384	34.1
Total votes		109,533	100.0
Democratic hold			

=== 2008 ===
2008 United States House of Representatives elections in California
Party	Candidate	Votes	%
Democratic	Linda Sánchez (Incumbent)	125,289	69.7
Republican	Diane A. Lenning	54,533	30.3
Total votes		179,822	100.0
Democratic hold			

=== 2010 ===
2010 United States House of Representatives elections in California
Party	Candidate	Votes	%
Democratic	Linda Sánchez (Incumbent)	81,590	63.3
Republican	Larry S. Andre	42,037	32.6
American Independent	John A. Smith	5,334	4.1
Total votes		128,961	100.0
Democratic hold			

=== 2012 ===
2012 United States House of Representatives elections in California
Party	Candidate	Votes	%
Republican	Ed Royce (Incumbent)	145,607	57.8
Democratic	Jay Chen	106,360	42.2
Total votes		251,967	100.0
Republican hold			

=== 2014 ===
2014 United States House of Representatives elections in California
Party	Candidate	Votes	%
Republican	Ed Royce (Incumbent)	91,319	68.5
Democratic	Peter O. Anderson	41,906	31.5
Total votes		133,225	100.0
Republican hold			

=== 2016 ===
2016 United States House of Representatives elections in California
Party	Candidate	Votes	%
Republican	Ed Royce (Incumbent)	150,777	57.2
Democratic	Brett Murdock	112,679	42.8
Total votes		263,456	100.0
Republican hold			

=== 2018 ===
In January 2018, Republican incumbent Ed Royce announced his retirement. Royce's retirement created great uncertainty and interest in this election, due to the possibility of two candidates of the same political party winning California's jungle primary.

The primary election resulted in two candidates of different parties, with Republican Assemblywoman Young Kim and Democrat Gil Cisneros coming in first and second place respectively. After the general election, it took several days to gather and tally absentee ballots, but on November 17, Cisneros was the projected winner of the election.

2018 United States House of Representatives elections in California
Party	Candidate	Votes	%
Democratic	Gil Cisneros	126,002	51.6
Republican	Young Kim	118,391	48.4
Total votes		244,393	100.0
Democratic gain from Republican			

=== 2020 ===
2020 United States House of Representatives elections in California
Party	Candidate	Votes	%
Republican	Young Kim	173,946	50.6
Democratic	Gil Cisneros (incumbent)	169,837	49.4
Total votes		343,783	100.0
Republican gain from Democratic			

=== 2022 ===
2022 United States House of Representatives elections in California
Party	Candidate	Votes	%
Democratic	Mark Takano (incumbent)	75,896	57.7
Republican	Aja Smith	55,701	42.3
Total votes		131,597	100.0
Democratic hold			

=== 2024 ===
California's 39th congressional district, 2024
Primary election
Party	Candidate	Votes	%
Democratic	Mark Takano (incumbent)	48,351	55.5
Republican	David Serpa	38,750	44.5
Total votes		87,101	100.0
General election
Democratic	Mark Takano (incumbent)	130,191	56.7
Republican	David Serpa	99,469	43.3
Total votes		229,660	100.0
Democratic hold			

== Historical district boundaries ==
The 39th congressional district was originally one of five reapportioned to California after the 1970 United States census.

From 1993 to 2003, the 39th congressional district was a Republican stronghold. In 2003, this territory was mostly redesignated into the neighboring 40th congressional district and 42nd congressional district. From 2003 to 2013, the 39th district was represented by Linda Sánchez, who now represents the 38th congressional district.

== See also ==
- List of United States congressional districts
- California's congressional districts
