= Val Verde High School =

High school in California, United States

Location
- 972 W Morgan St; Perris, Riverside County, California 92571-3103; United States
- Coordinates: 33°50′16″N 117°14′42″W

Information
- Type: Continuation high school
- School board: 5
- School district: Val Verde Unified School District
- NCES District ID: 0691135
- Superintendent: Michael McCormick
- School code: CA-3375242-3330560
- CEEB code: 052446
- NCES School ID: 069113510284
- Principal: Stacy Dedeaux
- Teaching staff: 25.09 (on an FTE basis)
- Grades: 9-12
- Enrollment: 322 (2023-2024)
  - Grade 9: 0
  - Grade 10: 1
  - Grade 11: 97
  - Grade 12: 224
- Student to teacher ratio: 12.83
- Campus type: Rural: fringe
- Feeder schools: Rancho Verde High School, Citrus Hill High School, Orange Vista High School
- Website: valverdehigh.valverde.edu/en-US

Val Verde High School is a continuation high school in Perris, California, United States. Students come from the neighboring Rancho Verde High School, Citrus Hill High School, and Orange Vista High School. It is part of the Val Verde Unified School District. As of 2023, Val Verde High enrolled 329 students.

The school lets students gain credits every quarter, which is an accelerated pace. The school allows students to earn college credits through dual enrollment courses. The school also offers several Career Technical Education (CTE) pathways, including welding, video production, logistics, pharmacy tech, woodworking, and graphic production technologies.
