= Homeland, California =

Homeland
- census-designated place
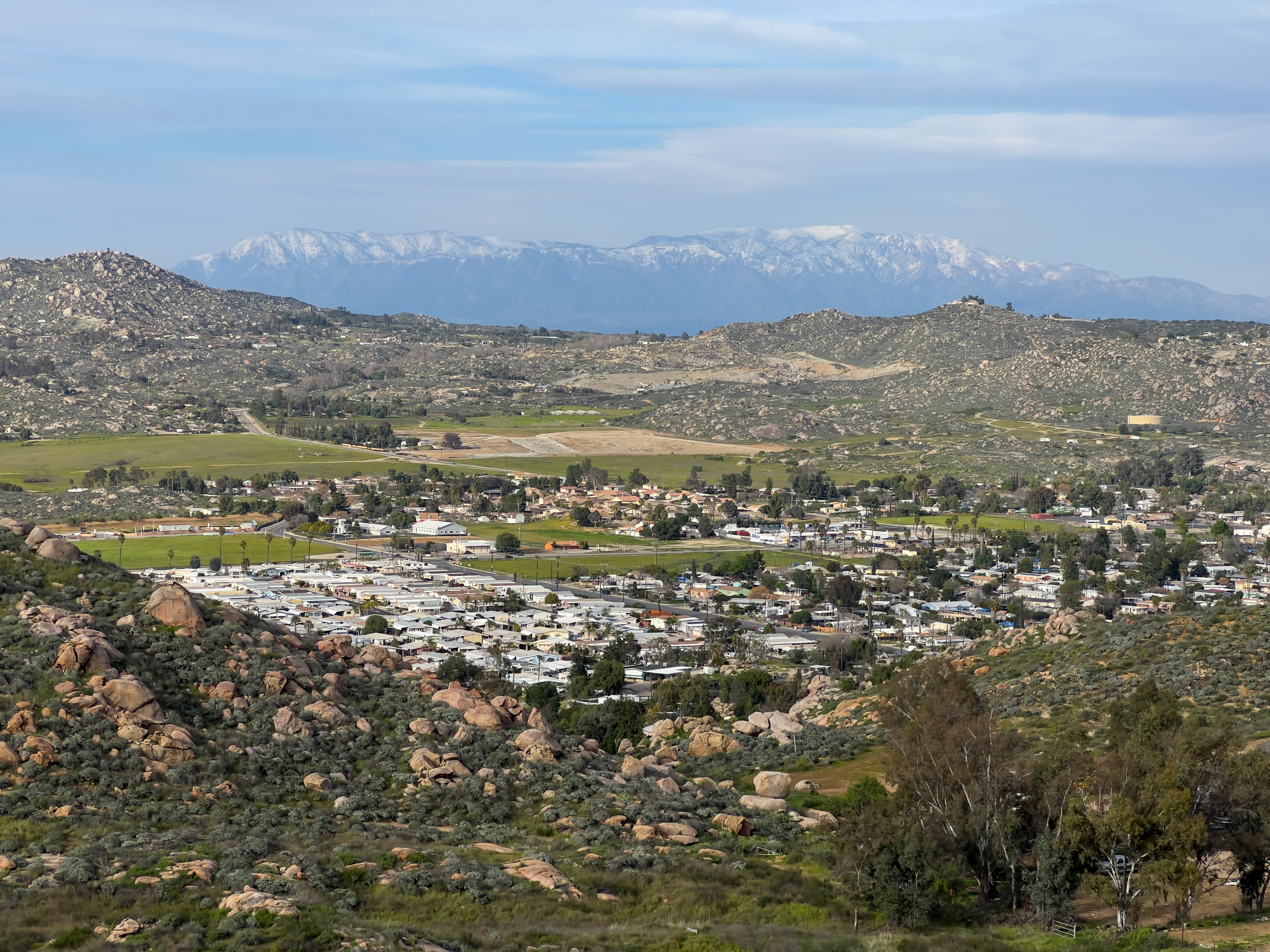
- Homeland, California viewed from Double Butte

- Location in Riverside County and the state of California

- Location in the United States
- Coordinates: 33°44′31″N 117°06′48″W
- Country: United States
- State: California
- County: Riverside

Area
  - Total: 4.270 sq mi (11.058 km^{2})
  - Land: 4.270 sq mi (11.058 km^{2})
  - Water: 0 sq mi (0 km^{2}) 0%
- Elevation: 1,604 ft (489 m)

Population (2020)
  - Total: 6,772
  - Density: 1,586/sq mi (612.4/km^{2})
- Time zone: UTC-8 (PST)
  - Summer (DST): UTC-7 (PDT)
- ZIP code: 92548
- Area code: 951
- FIPS code: 06-34316
- GNIS feature ID: 1652723

Homeland is simultaneously a town, a portion of the Winchester-Homeland Municipal Advisory Council (MAC) area which aspires to become a model city, and a census-designated place (CDP) all in the unincorporated area of Riverside County, California, United States.

Within the CDP, the population was 6,772 at the 2020 census, up from 5,969 at the 2010 census.

== Geography ==
Homeland is located at 33°44′31″N 117°6′48″W (33.741859, -117.113201).

According to the United States Census Bureau, the CDP has a total area of 4.3 square miles (11 km^{2}).

== Demographics ==
Historical population
Census	Pop.	Note	%±
1970	1,187		—
1980	2,616		120.4%
1990	3,312		26.6%
2000	3,710		12.0%
2010	5,969		60.9%
2020	6,772		13.5%
U.S. Decennial Census; 1860–1870 1880-1890; 1900 1910 1920; 1930 1940 1950; 1960 1970 1980; 1990 2000 2010

Homeland first appeared as an unincorporated place in the 1970 U.S. census; and was listed as a census designated place in the 1980 U.S. census.

=== Racial and ethnic composition ===
Homeland CDP, California – Racial and ethnic composition Note: the US Census treats Hispanic/Latino as an ethnic category. This table excludes Latinos from the racial categories and assigns them to a separate category. Hispanics/Latinos may be of any race.
Race / Ethnicity (NH = Non-Hispanic)	Pop 2000	Pop 2010	Pop 2020	% 2000	% 2010	% 2020
White alone (NH)	2,479	2,575	1,936	66.82%	43.14%	28.59%
Black or African American alone (NH)	21	109	96	0.57%	1.83%	1.42%
Native American or Alaska Native alone (NH)	27	29	36	0.73%	0.49%	0.53%
Asian alone (NH)	18	47	85	0.49%	0.79%	1.26%
Native Hawaiian or Pacific Islander alone (NH)	4	9	4	0.11%	0.15%	0.06%
Other race alone (NH)	3	3	21	0.08%	0.05%	0.31%
Mixed race or Multiracial (NH)	56	87	142	1.51%	1.46%	2.10%
Hispanic or Latino (any race)	1,102	3,110	4,452	29.70%	52.10%	65.74%
Total	3,710	5,969	6,772	100.00%	100.00%	100.00%

=== 2020 census ===
As of the 2020 census, Homeland had a population of 6,772 and a population density of 1,585.9 inhabitants per square mile (612.3/km^{2}). The median age was 36.9 years. The age distribution was 26.1% under the age of 18, 8.9% aged 18 to 24, 24.2% aged 25 to 44, 22.4% aged 45 to 64, and 18.4% who were 65 years of age or older. For every 100 females, there were 101.4 males, and for every 100 females age 18 and over there were 99.3 males age 18 and over.

The census reported that 99.8% of the population lived in households, 0.2% lived in non-institutionalized group quarters, and no one was institutionalized. In total, 96.4% of residents lived in urban areas, while 3.6% lived in rural areas.

There were 2,119 households, of which 35.0% had children under the age of 18 living in them. Of all households, 47.4% were married-couple households, 8.0% were cohabiting couple households, 17.0% were households with a male householder and no spouse or partner present, and 27.6% were households with a female householder and no spouse or partner present. About 23.7% of households were one person households, and 15.8% had someone living alone who was 65 years of age or older. The average household size was 3.19. There were 1,499 families (70.7% of all households).

There were 2,268 housing units at an average density of 531.1 units per square mile (205.1 units/km^{2}), of which 2,119 (93.4%) were occupied and 6.6% were vacant. Of occupied units, 69.1% were owner-occupied and 30.9% were renter-occupied. The homeowner vacancy rate was 2.5%, and the rental vacancy rate was 4.4%.

Racial composition as of the 2020 census
Race	Number	Percent
White	2,650	39.1%
Black or African American	108	1.6%
American Indian and Alaska Native	121	1.8%
Asian	92	1.4%
Native Hawaiian and Other Pacific Islander	14	0.2%
Some other race	2,825	41.7%
Two or more races	962	14.2%

=== Income and poverty ===
In 2023, the US Census Bureau estimated that the median household income was $54,863, and the per capita income was $25,583. About 9.3% of families and 11.4% of the population were below the poverty line.

=== 2010 census ===
At the 2010 census Homeland had a population of 5,969. The population density was 1,398.0 inhabitants per square mile (539.8/km^{2}). The racial makeup of Homeland was 3,727 (62.4%) White, 130 (2.2%) African American, 85 (1.4%) Native American, 49 (0.8%) Asian, 15 (0.3%) Pacific Islander, 1,673 (28.0%) from other races, and 290 (4.9%) from two or more races. Hispanic or Latino of any race were 3,110 persons (52.1%).

The census reported that 5,959 people (99.8% of the population) lived in households, 10 (0.2%) lived in non-institutionalized group quarters, and no one was institutionalized.

There were 1,964 households, 691 (35.2%) had children under the age of 18 living in them, 948 (48.3%) were opposite-sex married couples living together, 259 (13.2%) had a female householder with no husband present, 144 (7.3%) had a male householder with no wife present. There were 143 (7.3%) unmarried opposite-sex partnerships, and 11 (0.6%) same-sex married couples or partnerships. 494 households (25.2%) were one person and 314 (16.0%) had someone living alone who was 65 or older. The average household size was 3.03. There were 1,351 families (68.8% of households); the average family size was 3.63.

The age distribution was 1,655 people (27.7%) under the age of 18, 545 people (9.1%) aged 18 to 24, 1,362 people (22.8%) aged 25 to 44, 1,354 people (22.7%) aged 45 to 64, and 1,053 people (17.6%) who were 65 or older. The median age was 36.1 years. For every 100 females, there were 102.0 males. For every 100 females age 18 and over, there were 96.1 males.

There were 2,262 housing units at an average density of 529.8 per square mile, of the occupied units 1,330 (67.7%) were owner-occupied and 634 (32.3%) were rented. The homeowner vacancy rate was 5.0%; the rental vacancy rate was 5.5%. 3,554 people (59.5% of the population) lived in owner-occupied housing units and 2,405 people (40.3%) lived in rental housing units.

== Politics ==
In the California State Legislature Homeland is in the 32nd senatorial district, represented by Republican Kelly Seyarto, and the 60th Assembly district, represented by Democrat Corey Jackson.

In the United States House of Representatives, Homeland is in California's 41st congressional district, represented by Republican Ken Calvert.

== Education ==
It is in the Romoland Elementary School District, and the Heritage High School

for grades 9–12.
