= Nuevo, California =

Nuevo, CA
- census-designated place
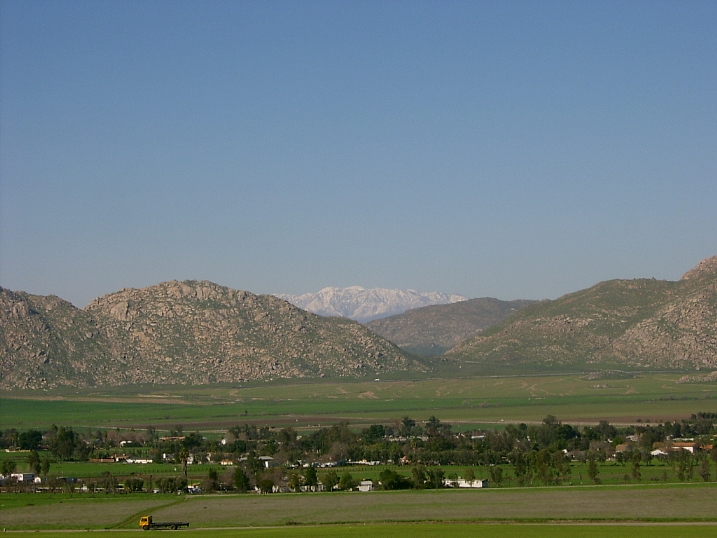
- Nuevo, California. Distant view of snow-capped San Gabriel Mountains from Nuevo Road.

- Location in Riverside County and the state of California

- Location in the United States
- Coordinates: 33°48′05″N 117°08′45″W
- Country: United States
- State: California
- County: Riverside

Area
  - Total: 6.771 sq mi (17.538 km^{2})
  - Land: 6.771 sq mi (17.538 km^{2})
  - Water: 0 sq mi (0 km^{2}) 0%
- Elevation: 1,490 ft (454 m)

Population (2020)
  - Total: 6,733
  - Density: 994.3/sq mi (383.9/km^{2})
- Time zone: UTC-8 (PST)
  - Summer (DST): UTC-7 (PDT)
- ZIP code: 92567
- Area code: 951
- FIPS code: 06-52624
- GNIS feature ID: 1661125

Nuevo (Spanish for "New") is a rural community located east of Lake Perris and the city of Perris in Riverside County, California. The population of the census-designated place (CDP) is 6,733 according to the 2020 census, up from 6,447 at the 2010 census.

== Geography ==
Nuevo is located at 33°48′25″N 117°7′43″W (33.807027, -117.128585).

According to the United States Census Bureau, the CDP has a total area of 6.8 square miles (17.5 km^{2}), all of it land.

The geography of the area consists of a wide variety of geographical features, including rocky and rolling hills and low-lying valleys. The usually dry San Jacinto River runs along the northern portion of the area.

The natural vegetation consists primarily of Coastal Sage Scrub, though much of this natural vegetation is visibly absent or exists in remnant form within the lowlands of the area where residential and agricultural uses are most prevalent.

== Demographics ==
Historical population
Census	Pop.	Note	%±
1980	1,628		—
1990	3,010		84.9%
2000	4,135		37.4%
2010	6,447		55.9%
2020	6,733		4.4%
U.S. Decennial Census; 1860–1870 1880-1890; 1900 1910 1920; 1930 1940 1950; 1960 1970 1980; 1990 2000 2010

Nuevo first appeared as a census designated place in the 1980 U.S. census.

=== Racial and ethnic composition ===
Nuevo CDP, California – Racial and ethnic composition Note: the US Census treats Hispanic/Latino as an ethnic category. This table excludes Latinos from the racial categories and assigns them to a separate category. Hispanics/Latinos may be of any race.
Race / Ethnicity (NH = Non-Hispanic)	Pop 2000	Pop 2010	Pop 2020	% 2000	% 2010	% 2020
White alone (NH)	2,702	2,601	1,952	65.34%	40.34%	28.99%
Black or African American alone (NH)	84	105	112	2.03%	1.63%	1.66%
Native American or Alaska Native alone (NH)	12	29	15	0.29%	0.45%	0.22%
Asian alone (NH)	53	77	71	1.28%	1.19%	1.05%
Native Hawaiian or Pacific Islander alone (NH)	1	15	20	0.02%	0.23%	0.30%
Other race alone (NH)	6	14	18	0.15%	0.22%	0.27%
Mixed race or Multiracial (NH)	62	92	167	1.50%	1.43%	2.48%
Hispanic or Latino (any race)	1,215	3,514	4,378	29.38%	54.51%	65.02%
Total	4,135	6,447	6,733	100.00%	100.00%	100.00%

=== 2020 census ===
As of the 2020 census, Nuevo had a population of 6,733 and a population density of 994.4 inhabitants per square mile (383.9/km^{2}). The median age was 35.6 years. 25.9% of residents were under the age of 18, 11.0% were aged 18 to 24, 25.2% were aged 25 to 44, 25.2% were aged 45 to 64, and 12.7% were 65 years of age or older. For every 100 females there were 103.1 males, and for every 100 females age 18 and over there were 102.1 males age 18 and over.

90.5% of residents lived in urban areas, while 9.5% lived in rural areas. The census reported that 99.9% of the population lived in households, 0.1% lived in non-institutionalized group quarters, and no one was institutionalized.

There were 1,854 households in Nuevo, of which 44.4% had children under the age of 18 living in them. Of all households, 59.5% were married-couple households, 5.9% were cohabiting couple households, 15.0% were households with a male householder and no spouse or partner present, and 19.5% were households with a female householder and no spouse or partner present. About 12.2% of all households were made up of individuals and 6.7% had someone living alone who was 65 years of age or older. The average household size was 3.63. There were 1,562 families (84.3% of all households).

There were 1,919 housing units at an average density of 283.4 units per square mile (109.4 units/km^{2}), of which 1,854 (96.6%) were occupied. Of occupied units, 79.8% were owner-occupied and 20.2% were occupied by renters. The homeowner vacancy rate was 0.7%, the rental vacancy rate was 1.8%, and 3.4% of housing units were vacant.

Racial composition as of the 2020 census
Race	Number	Percent
White	2,632	39.1%
Black or African American	134	2.0%
American Indian and Alaska Native	112	1.7%
Asian	80	1.2%
Native Hawaiian and Other Pacific Islander	22	0.3%
Some other race	2,548	37.8%

=== Demographic estimates ===
In 2023, the US Census Bureau estimated that 21.3% of the population were foreign-born. Of all people aged 5 or older, 46.6% spoke only English at home, 53.1% spoke Spanish, and 0.3% spoke other Indo-European languages. Of those aged 25 or older, 77.8% were high school graduates and 12.9% had a bachelor's degree.

=== Income and poverty ===
The median household income in 2023 was $92,443, and the per capita income was $32,101. About 5.2% of families and 9.2% of the population were below the poverty line.

=== 2010 census ===
The 2010 United States census reported that Nuevo had a population of 6,447. The population density was 952.1 inhabitants per square mile (367.6/km^{2}). The racial makeup of Nuevo was 4,011 (62.2%) White, 113 (1.8%) African American, 91 (1.4%) Native American, 82 (1.3%) Asian, 16 (0.2%) Pacific Islander, 1,810 (28.1%) from other races, and 324 (5.0%) from two or more races. Hispanic or Latino of any race were 3,514 persons (54.5%).

The Census reported that 6,445 people (100% of the population) lived in households, 2 (0%) lived in non-institutionalized group quarters, and 0 (0%) were institutionalized.

There were 1,795 households, out of which 872 (48.6%) had children under the age of 18 living in them, 1,178 (65.6%) were opposite-sex married couples living together, 204 (11.4%) had a female householder with no husband present, 122 (6.8%) had a male householder with no wife present. There were 101 (5.6%) unmarried opposite-sex partnerships, and 12 (0.7%) same-sex married couples or partnerships. 219 households (12.2%) were made up of individuals, and 80 (4.5%) had someone living alone who was 65 years of age or older. The average household size was 3.59. There were 1,504 families (83.8% of all households); the average family size was 3.87.

The population age distribution is 1,935 people (30.0%) under the age of 18, 690 people (10.7%) aged 18 to 24, 1,593 people (24.7%) aged 25 to 44, 1,615 people (25.1%) aged 45 to 64, and 614 people (9.5%) who were 65 years of age or older. The median age was 32.9 years. For every 100 females, there were 100.6 males. For every 100 females age 18 and over, there were 101.1 males.

There were 1,963 housing units at an average density of 289.9 per square mile (111.9/km^{2}), of which 1,400 (78.0%) were owner-occupied, and 395 (22.0%) were occupied by renters. The homeowner vacancy rate was 2.6%; the rental vacancy rate was 4.1%. 4,823 people (74.8% of the population) lived in owner-occupied housing units and 1,622 people (25.2%) lived in rental housing units.

== Government ==
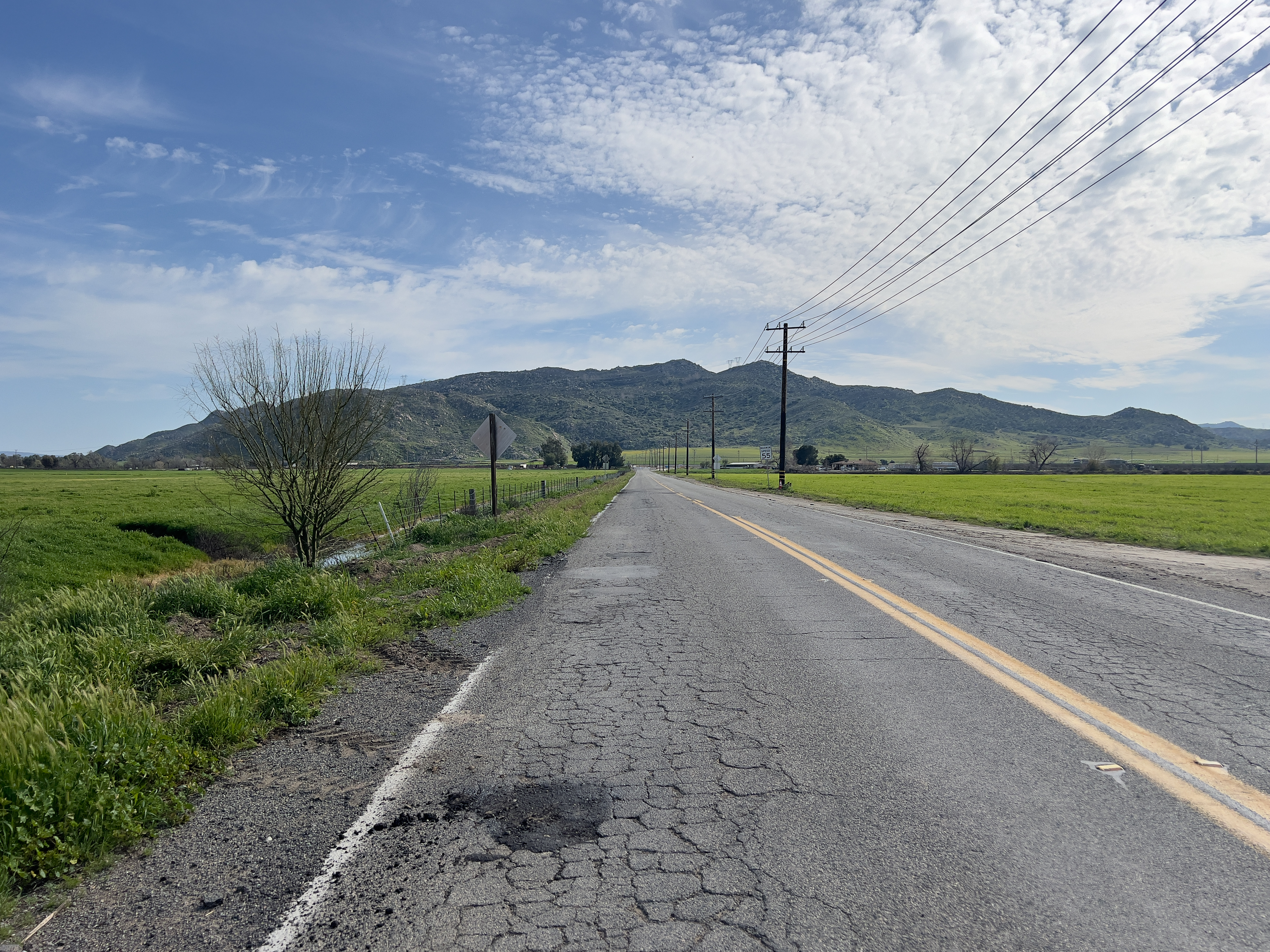
Road in Nuevo, California

Nuevo is in an unincorporated area and falls under the jurisdiction of the 5th District of Riverside County. Being unincorporated, Nuevo has no formal local government such as a mayor, city council, or treasurer - however, it has a Municipal Advisory Council (MAC), made up of residents appointed by the 5th District county supervisor.

In the California State Legislature, Nuevo is in the 31st senatorial district, represented by Democrat Sabrina Cervantes, and the 60th Assembly district, represented by Democrat Corey Jackson.

In the United States House of Representatives, Nuevo is in California's 41st congressional district, represented by Republican Ken Calvert. Republican Shaaf "Sohail" Patel, lifelong Nuevo resident, Chairmen of Nuevo-Lakeview Incorporation Committee, is challenging the district 41 incumbent in the 2026 election cycle.

== Education ==
Most of Nuevo is in the Nuview Union Elementary School District while other parts are in the Romoland Elementary School District. All of Nuevo is in the Perris Union High School District for grades 9-12.
