= Farmer Boys =

Farmer Boys may refer to:

In food:

- Farmer Boys (fast casual chain), an American fast casual restaurant chain

In music:

- Farmer Boys (band), a German metal band
- The Farmer's Boys, a British band
