= Perris Union High School District =

Public school district in Riverside County, California

Coordinates: 33°46′56″N 117°13′39″W

The Perris Union High School District is a school district serving Menifee and Perris, California. It is the only high school-only district in Riverside County.

The Perris Union High School District educates about 10,000 secondary and middle school students living in the 2 rapidly growing cities and surrounding rural areas in Menifee Valley and Perris Valley.

== Boundary ==
The school district boundary is as follows:

- For grades 7-12: Portions of Perris, all of Good Hope census-designated place, and portions of Lake Elsinore, and the Meadowbrook and Mead Valley CDPs
- For grades 9-12 only: All of Menifee, portions of Lake Elsinore, Murrieta, Perris, and Wildomar, the CDPs of Homeland, Lakeview, Nuevo, and Romoland, and a portion of the French Valley CDP.

== Schools ==
- California Military Institute
- Heritage High School
- Liberty High School
- Paloma Valley High School
- Pathways for Adult Life Skills
- Perris Community Adult School
- Perris High School
- Perris Lake High School
- Pinacate Middle School
- Scholar+Online Learning Academy

== Feeder districts ==
- Menifee Union School District
- Nuview Union Elementary School District
- Perris Elementary School District
- Romoland Elementary School District

== Local higher education facilities ==
- California Baptist University
- California State University, San Bernardino
- Mt. San Jacinto College (campuses in San Jacinto and Menifee)
- Riverside Community College (campuses located in Norco and Moreno Valley)
- University of California, Riverside
