= California Military Institute =

Location
- 755 North A Street; Perris, California 92570; United States; 33°47′32″N 117°14′03″W

Information
- School type: Public
- Motto: "Leading the charge"
- Established: 2003
- School district: Perris Union High School District
- Principal: Dr. Michael Dodson
- Teaching staff: 36.05 (FTE)
- Grades: 5-12
- Enrollment: 1,049 (2018-19)
- Student to teacher ratio: 29.10
- Colours: gold & black
- Athletics: C.M.I has a variety of sports not only offered to high school Cadets but also middle school and elementary cadets.
- Sports: High school female sports: -Varsity/JV Volleyball -Varsity/JV Cheerleading -Varsity/JV Track -Varsity/JV Cross Country -Varsity/JV Basketball -Varsity Softball -Varsity Soccer High school male sports: -Varsity/JV Football -Varsity/JV Track -Varsity/JV Cross Country -Varsity/JV Basketball -Varsity/JV Cheerleading -Varsity Soccer -Varsity Baseball Middle school/elementary school -Girls/Boys Soccer -Girls/Boys Basketball -Girls/Boys Cheerleading -Girls Softball -Boys Football -Girls Volleyball
- Mascot: "Rough Riders"
- Nickname: C.M.I Rough Riders
- Rival: Nuview Bridge Early College High School and Army Navy Academy
- Website: www.cmicharter.org

California Military Institute is a publicly funded charter school located in Perris, California, which serves grades 5–12. It is attended by 1100 students. It is part of the Perris Union High School District. The California Military Institute is also known by its abbreviation: CMI. C.M.I's mascot is Theodore "Teddy" Roosevelt's Rough Riders. Students are affiliated with the California Cadet Corps.

The California Military Institute is now given free uniforms from the CACC, because of this students no longer have to pay for their uniforms. High school students are required to wear the uniform ACU. Middle school/Elementary school students are required to wear the Class C uniform. All students must wear a Class B uniform on the required day as well. C.M.I is visited constantly throughout the year by many military branches, especially during the Pass-n-Review C.M.I has once every semester.

C.M.I does not just focus on the military side of the school but also offers a variety of sports students can try out for. These sports are also offered to middle school and elementary students.
