= Mead Valley, California =

Mead Valley
- census-designated place
- Location in Riverside County, California

- Position in California.
- Coordinates: 33°50′00″N 117°17′06″W
- Country: United States
- State: California
- County: Riverside

Area
  - Total: 19.080 sq mi (49.416 km^{2})
  - Land: 19.080 sq mi (49.416 km^{2})
  - Water: 0 sq mi (0 km^{2}) 0%
- Elevation: 1,663 ft (507 m)

Population (2020)
  - Total: 19,819
  - Density: 1,038.8/sq mi (401.06/km^{2})
- Time zone: UTC-8 (Pacific (PST))
  - Summer (DST): UTC-7 (PDT)
- ZIP Code: 92570
- Area code: 951
- GNIS feature ID: 2583077

Mead Valley is a census-designated place in the Inland Empire region of Riverside County, California. Mead Valley sits at an elevation of 1,663 feet (507 m). The 2020 United States census reported Mead Valley's population was 19,819.

Mead Valley is located in a valley of the same name in the northeastern Temescal Mountains, south of the city of Riverside and west of the city of Perris. It is drained by the north fork of Cajalco Creek.

== Geography ==
According to the United States Census Bureau, the CDP covers an area of 19.1 square miles (49.4 km^{2}), all of it land.

== Demographics ==
Historical population
Census	Pop.	Note	%±
2010	18,510		—
2020	19,819		7.1%
U.S. Decennial Census; 1860–1870 1880-1890; 1900 1910 1920; 1930 1940 1950; 1960 1970 1980; 1990 2000 2010

Mead Valley first appeared as a census designated place in the 2010 U.S. census.

=== Racial and ethnic composition ===
Mead Valley CDP, California – Racial and ethnic composition Note: the US Census treats Hispanic/Latino as an ethnic category. This table excludes Latinos from the racial categories and assigns them to a separate category. Hispanics/Latinos may be of any race.
Race / Ethnicity (NH = Non-Hispanic)	Pop 2010	Pop 2020	% 2010	% 2020
White alone (NH)	3,142	2,553	16.97%	12.88%
Black or African American alone (NH)	1,422	891	7.68%	4.50%
Native American or Alaska Native alone (NH)	45	82	0.24%	0.41%
Asian alone (NH)	249	266	1.35%	1.34%
Native Hawaiian or Pacific Islander alone (NH)	11	19	0.06%	0.10%
Other race alone (NH)	43	61	0.23%	0.31%
Mixed race or Multiracial (NH)	203	340	1.10%	1.72%
Hispanic or Latino (any race)	13,395	15,607	72.37%	78.75%
Total	18,510	19,819	100.00%	100.00%

=== 2020 census ===
As of the 2020 census, Mead Valley had a population of 19,819 and a population density of 1,038.7 inhabitants per square mile (401.0/km^{2}). The census reported that 88.8% of residents lived in urban areas and 11.2% lived in rural areas.

Racial composition as of the 2020 census
Race	Number	Percent
White	4,823	24.3%
Black or African American	944	4.8%
American Indian and Alaska Native	647	3.3%
Asian	301	1.5%
Native Hawaiian and Other Pacific Islander	41	0.2%
Some other race	9,764	49.3%
Two or more races	3,299	16.6%

The median age was 31.2 years. 28.3% of residents were under the age of 18, 11.7% were aged 18 to 24, 26.1% were 25 to 44, 23.6% were 45 to 64, and 10.3% were 65 years of age or older. For every 100 females there were 105.4 males, and for every 100 females age 18 and over there were 105.0 males age 18 and over.

Of the population, 99.3% lived in households, 0.6% lived in non-institutionalized group quarters, and 0.1% were institutionalized.

There were 4,560 households, of which 51.4% had children under the age of 18 living in them. 55.7% were married-couple households, 6.8% were cohabiting couple households, 17.5% were households with a male householder and no spouse or partner present, and 19.9% were households with a female householder and no spouse or partner present. About 11.3% of all households were made up of individuals, and 5.5% had someone living alone who was 65 years of age or older. The average household size was 4.32. There were 3,836 families (84.1% of all households).

There were 4,730 housing units at an average density of 247.9 units per square mile (95.7 units/km^{2}), of which 3.6% were vacant. Of the 4,560 occupied units, 68.5% were owner-occupied and 31.5% were occupied by renters. The homeowner vacancy rate was 0.7% and the rental vacancy rate was 1.4%.

=== 2023 ACS estimates ===
In 2023, the US Census Bureau estimated that 39.0% of the population were foreign-born. Of all people aged 5 or older, 21.5% spoke only English at home, 75.5% spoke Spanish, 1.8% spoke other Indo-European languages, and 1.1% spoke Asian or Pacific Islander languages. Of those aged 25 or older, 62.7% were high school graduates and 8.4% had a bachelor's degree.

The median household income in 2023 was $90,358, and the per capita income was $24,053. About 10.0% of families and 12.8% of the population were below the poverty line.

== Government ==
In the California State Legislature, Mead Valley is in the 31st senatorial district, represented by Democrat Sabrina Cervantes, and in the 60th Assembly district, represented by Democrat Corey Jackson.

In the United States House of Representatives, Mead Valley is in California's 39th congressional district, represented by Democrat Mark Takano.

== Education ==
Almost all of the CDP is in Val Verde Unified School District, while a small portion is in Perris Elementary School District and Perris Union High School District for grades 7-12.
