= Val Verde Unified School District =

Public school district in Riverside County, California

Address
- 975 West Morgan Street Perris, California, 92571; United States

District information
- Type: Public
- Grades: K–12
- NCES District ID: 0691135

Students and staff
- Students: 19,303 (2020–2021)
- Teachers: 843.43 (FTE)
- Staff: 943.89 (FTE)
- Student–teacher ratio: 22.89:1

Other information
- Website: www.valverde.edu

The Val Verde Unified School District (VVUSD) is one of two public education governing bodies in Moreno Valley, California which stretches into Perris, California. It currently operates 21 schools and is the neighbor to its larger counterpart, the Moreno Valley Unified School District. VVUSD serves 19,080 students as of 2024.

== Boundary ==
The district includes portions of the municipalities of Moreno Valley and Perris. It also includes most of the census-designated place of Mead Valley and portions of the CDPs of Lake Mathews, March ARB, and Woodcrest.

== Schools ==
=== Preschools ===
- El Potrero Preschool

=== Elementary schools ===
- Avalon Elementary
- Columbia Elementary
- Lasselle Elementary
- Manuel L. Real Elementary
- Mary McLeod Bethune Elementary
- May Ranch Elementary
- Mead Valley Elementary
- Rainbow Ridge Elementary
- Sierra Vista Elementary
- Triple Crown Elementary
- Val Verde Elementary
- Victoriano Elementary

=== Middle schools ===
- March Middle School
- Lakeside Middle School
- Tomas Rivera Middle School
- Vista Verde Middle School

=== High schools ===
- Citrus Hill High School
- Rancho Verde High School
- Val Verde Academy
- Val Verde High School
- Orange Vista High School

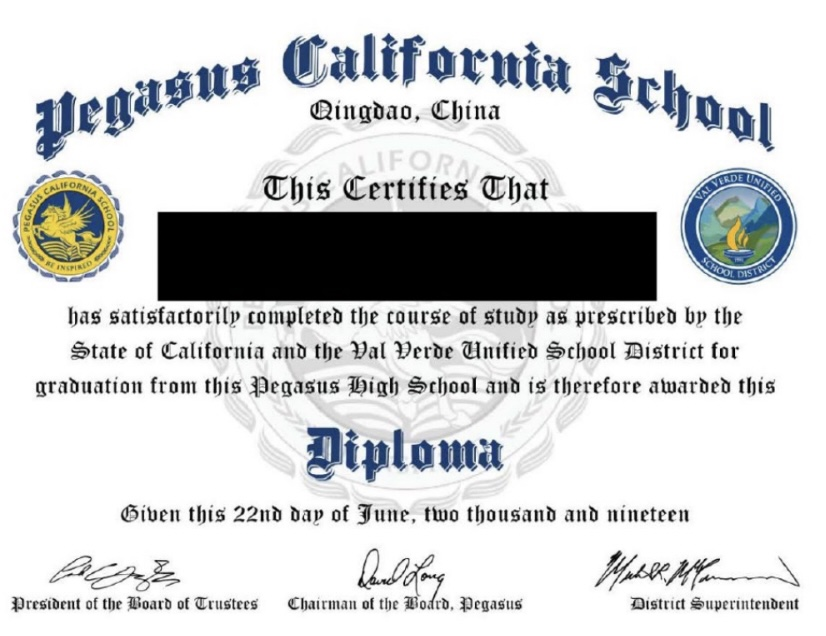
A fraudulent high school diploma issued by what was styled to be the "Pegasus California School" of the Val Verde Unified School District.

== School Board ==
- Gordon Amerson - Superintendent
- Marla Kirkland - President
- Melinda Young - Vice President
- Dolores Holmes - Clerk
- Daniel Aquino - Member
- Erika Zamora - Member

== History ==
In 2021, it was reported by Business Insider that Val Verde Unified had engaged in a scheme to funnel children in Qingdao, China to US colleges. The plan relied on the issuance of fraudulent high school diplomas from "Pegasus California School," a Qingdao-based school that was framed as a legitimate part of VVUSD and thus able to issue proper diplomas from an accredited institution. A 2026 by the Riverside County Office of Education confirmed the report, issuing a rebuke of the school district and several former senior California school officials, including former California State Superintendent Tom Torlakson and former Education Secretary David Long.

== See also ==
- List of school districts in Riverside County, California
