= Highgrove, California =

Highgrove
- census-designated place
- Location in Riverside County and the state of California

- Location in the United States
- Coordinates: 34°00′57″N 117°20′00″W
- Country: United States
- State: California
- County: Riverside

Area
  - Total: 3.219 sq mi (8.337 km^{2})
  - Land: 3.219 sq mi (8.337 km^{2})
  - Water: 0 sq mi (0 km^{2}) 0%
- Elevation: 950 ft (290 m)

Population (2020)
  - Total: 7,515
  - Density: 2,335/sq mi (901.4/km^{2})
- Time zone: UTC-8 (PST)
  - Summer (DST): UTC-7 (PDT)
- ZIP code: 92507
- Area code: 951
- FIPS code: 06-33574
- GNIS feature ID: 1652721

Highgrove is a census-designated place (CDP) and an unincorporated community in the Inland Empire region of Riverside County, California, United States. The population was 3,988 at the 2010 census, up from 3,445 at the 2000 census. The latest 2020 census shows 7,515 total population, an 88.4% increase from last 2010 census, which makes it the fastest-growing location in entire Riverside County.

== History ==
Highgrove was founded in 1886, originally called East Riverside, but in 1897 during a naming contest, it was renamed to Highgrove, after not getting it confused with the city of Riverside. Citrus-farm growers have occupied Highgrove area since beginning of history, with its superior fresh-wind conditions from the west, blowing into east of a cove-shape like terrain, making it one the most valuable places in the Inland Empire for citrus-farming by generations of farmers. Due to the stronger wind conditions that can easily move air out, a landfill dumping ground was opened in 1947 for discarded farm waste. Originally, it operated as a fire-burn dump during the 1950s, until 1960 when there was a concern of heavy-smog in southern California.

In 1970, the Highgrove Agricultural Preserve conservation was formed in order to support the growing number of orange trees from farmers. More diverse of citrus fruits were being grown for the packing houses in Riverside. However, farming output could only peaked by the mid-1980s. More competition on fruit prices had increased daily from new farming businesses in the Central California region. Highgrove's another biggest threat was its rising land-value and water cost for the groves by the end of 1980s, due to its close-proximity to downtown Riverside, which made farm crops more unprofitable. By 1990, the preserve contract was not renewed, citing increases of population density, housing shortage, traffic jam, university students commuting to campus, and smog near the city of Riverside. Citrus (mostly orange) trees were gradually phased out and torn down completely by the year 2000.

The Highgrove sanitary landfill closed permanently in 1998, after 51 years of operation. Since the 2018 inspection yearly report, no methane output has been detected in any of the designated area. Today, new construction homes occupy near front of it, across Pigeon Pass Road, on the former Highgrove Agricultural Preserve land. The citrus industry declined in the area as more agricultural areas were replaced by new subdivisions.

In 2007, the Spring Mountain Ranch master-planned community, inspired by the Spring Mountain name from Las Vegas, NV area, was chosen and conceived by RWR Homes. However, construction halted due to the 2008 recession. RWR Homes' original vision was to, hopefully, incorporate Highgrove into a city someday with a rename. In 2014, KB Home had agreed to take over from RWR Homes, and would complete this long-awaited project today, with no HOA fee as its initial main selling point. Other builders included are D.R. Horton, Lennar, and PulteGroup with some HOA fee.

Today, Highgrove is seeing a transformation with over 2,500 new single-family homes and 846 new townhomes proposed at the eastside, at the once former Highgrove Agricultural Preserve that was officially diminished by 2008. In addition, a new K-8 school or magnet high school is planned. The new housing units are currently the only ones available near the University of California, Riverside campus and downtown Riverside.

== Geography ==
Highgrove is located at 34°00′55″N 117°19′51″W. Highgrove is between the city of Riverside and Grand Terrace. It is located east of Interstate 215, west of Reche Canyon Rd., some portions west of Interstate 215, and north of the University of California, Riverside campus.

According to the United States Census Bureau, the CDP has a total area of 3.2 square miles (8.3 km^{2}), all of it land. Elevation is 951 ft.

The highest-elevation point in Highgrove with homes built is up to 1,400 ft. at the eastside, on the corner intersection of Country Mile Ln. and Muir Ln.. Weather tends to be slightly cooler up there than at the lower elevation area around the 215-freeway area. It's a popular tourist spot to see the panoramic views of San Bernardino County and the highest peak of Mt. San Antonio on a clear day. Other unofficial highest-point elevation is scattered near Reche Canyon Road.

The lowest-elevation point is 848 ft., on the corner intersection of Cannes Ave. and La Ciotat Way, bordering city of Riverside's Northside neighborhood.

== Demographics ==
Historical population
Census	Pop.	Note	%±
1990	3,175		—
2000	3,445		8.5%
2010	3,988		15.8%
2020	7,515		88.4%
U.S. Decennial Census; 1860–1870 1880-1890; 1900 1910 1920; 1930 1940 1950; 1960 1970 1980; 1990 2000 2010

Highgrove first appeared as a census designated place in the 1990 U.S. census.

=== Racial and ethnic composition ===
Highgrove CDP, California – Racial and ethnic composition Note: the US Census treats Hispanic/Latino as an ethnic category. This table excludes Latinos from the racial categories and assigns them to a separate category. Hispanics/Latinos may be of any race.
Race / Ethnicity (NH = Non-Hispanic)	Pop 2000	Pop 2010	Pop 2020	% 2000	% 2010	% 2020
White alone (NH)	1,191	1,075	1,500	34.57%	26.96%	19.96%
Black or African American alone (NH)	139	132	452	4.03%	3.31%	6.01%
Native American or Alaska Native alone (NH)	24	8	25	0.70%	0.20%	0.33%
Asian alone (NH)	75	100	763	2.18%	2.51%	10.15%
Native Hawaiian or Pacific Islander alone (NH)	15	13	20	0.44%	0.33%	0.27%
Other race alone (NH)	5	4	48	0.15%	0.10%	0.64%
Mixed race or Multiracial (NH)	44	52	225	1.28%	1.30%	2.99%
Hispanic or Latino (any race)	1,952	2,604	4,482	56.66%	65.30%	59.64%
Total	3,445	3,988	7,515	100.00%	100.00%	100.00%

=== 2020 census ===
As of the 2020 census, Highgrove had a population of 7,515. The population density was 2,334.6 inhabitants per square mile (901.4/km^{2}). Of residents, 99.6% lived in urban areas and 0.4% lived in rural areas.

The age distribution was 27.3% under the age of 18, 10.8% aged 18 to 24, 30.4% aged 25 to 44, 22.7% aged 45 to 64, and 8.9% who were 65 years of age or older. The median age was 32.5 years. For every 100 females, there were 97.9 males, and for every 100 females age 18 and over, there were 96.5 males age 18 and over.

The census reported that the whole population lived in households. There were 2,131 households, of which 46.2% had children under the age of 18 living in them. Of all households, 58.1% were married-couple households, 7.6% were cohabiting couple households, 14.7% were households with a male householder and no spouse or partner present, and 19.6% were households with a female householder and no spouse or partner present. About 13.6% of households were made up of individuals, and 5.1% had someone living alone who was 65 years of age or older. The average household size was 3.53. There were 1,725 families (80.9% of all households).

There were 2,195 housing units at an average density of 681.9 units per square mile (263.3 units/km^{2}), of which 2,131 (97.1%) were occupied. Of occupied units, 69.9% were owner-occupied and 30.1% were renter-occupied. Of all housing units, 2.9% were vacant. The homeowner vacancy rate was 0.8%, and the rental vacancy rate was 2.4%.

Racial composition as of the 2020 census
Race	Number	Percent
White	2,517	33.5%
Black or African American	483	6.4%
American Indian and Alaska Native	153	2.0%
Asian	797	10.6%
Native Hawaiian and Other Pacific Islander	24	0.3%
Some other race	2,420	32.2%
Two or more races	1,121	14.9%

=== Income and poverty ===
In 2023, the US Census Bureau estimated that the median household income was $109,657, and the per capita income was $40,390. About 12.2% of families and 11.0% of the population were below the poverty line.

=== 2010 census ===
As of the 2010 census, Highgrove had a population of 3,988. The population density was 1,239.0 inhabitants per square mile (478.4/km^{2}). The racial makeup of Highgrove was 2,104 (52.8%) White, 162 (4.1%) African American, 41 (1.0%) Native American, 113 (2.8%) Asian, 13 (0.3%) Pacific Islander, 1,388 (34.8%) from other races, and 167 (4.2%) from two or more races. Hispanic or Latino of any race were 2,604 persons (65.3%).

The census reported that 3,982 people (99.8% of the population) lived in households, 6 (0.2%) lived in non-institutionalized group quarters, and no one was institutionalized.

There were 1,136 households, 553 (48.7%) had children under the age of 18 living in them, 610 (53.7%) were opposite-sex married couples living together, 188 (16.5%) had a female householder with no husband present, 102 (9.0%) had a male householder with no wife present. There were 101 (8.9%) unmarried opposite-sex partnerships, and 6 (0.5%) same-sex married couples or partnerships. 181 households (15.9%) were one person and 50 (4.4%) had someone living alone who was 65 or older. The average household size was 3.51. There were 900 families (79.2% of households); the average family size was 3.90.

The age distribution was 1,246 people (31.2%) under the age of 18, 464 people (11.6%) aged 18 to 24, 1,038 people (26.0%) aged 25 to 44, 952 people (23.9%) aged 45 to 64, and 288 people (7.2%) who were 65 or older. The median age was 30.2 years. For every 100 females, there were 102.8 males. For every 100 females age 18 and over, there were 101.9 males.

There were 1,227 housing units at an average density of 381.2 per square mile, of the occupied units 633 (55.7%) were owner-occupied and 503 (44.3%) were rented. The homeowner vacancy rate was 2.8%; the rental vacancy rate was 7.5%. 2,217 people (55.6% of the population) lived in owner-occupied housing units and 1,765 people (44.3%) lived in rental housing units.

== Government ==
Federal:

- In the United States House of Representatives, Highgrove is in California's 39th congressional district, represented by Democrat Mark Takano.
- In the United States Senate, California is represented by Democrats Alex Padilla and Adam Schiff.

State:

- In the California State Legislature, Highgrove is in the 31st senatorial district, represented by Democrat Sabrina Cervantes, and in the 58th Assembly district, represented by Republican Leticia Castillo.

Local:

- In the Riverside County Board of Supervisors, Highgrove is in the First District, represented by Jose Medina.
