= Lakeview, California =

Lakeview
- census-designated place
- Location in Riverside County and the state of California

- Location in the United States
- Coordinates: 33°50′19″N 117°07′05″W
- Country: United States
- State: California
- County: Riverside

Area
  - Total: 3.260 sq mi (8.443 km^{2})
  - Land: 3.260 sq mi (8.443 km^{2})
  - Water: 0 sq mi (0 km^{2}) 0%
- Elevation: 1,450 ft (442 m)

Population (2020)
  - Total: 1,977
  - Density: 606.5/sq mi (234.2/km^{2})
- Time zone: UTC-8 (PST)
  - Summer (DST): UTC-7 (PDT)
- ZIP code: 92567
- Area code: 951
- FIPS code: 06-39836
- GNIS feature ID: 1652740

Lakeview is a census-designated place (CDP) in Riverside County, California, United States. The population was 1,977 at the 2020 census, down from 2,104 at the 2010 census. The community is named for nearby Mystic Lake.

== Geography ==
According to the United States Census Bureau, the CDP has a total area of 3.3 square miles (8.5 km^{2}), all of it land.

== Demographics ==
Historical population
Census	Pop.	Note	%±
1990	1,448		—
2000	1,619		11.8%
2010	2,104		30.0%
2020	1,977		−6.0%
U.S. Decennial Census; 1860–1870 1880-1890; 1900 1910 1920; 1930 1940 1950; 1960 1970 1980; 1990 2000 2010

Lakeview first appeared as a census designated place in the 1990 U.S. census.

=== Racial and ethnic composition ===
Lakeview CDP, California – Racial and ethnic composition Note: the US Census treats Hispanic/Latino as an ethnic category. This table excludes Latinos from the racial categories and assigns them to a separate category. Hispanics/Latinos may be of any race.
Race / Ethnicity (NH = Non-Hispanic)	Pop 2000	Pop 2010	Pop 2020	% 2000	% 2010	% 2020
White alone (NH)	836	671	439	51.64%	31.89%	22.21%
Black or African American alone (NH)	12	15	20	0.74%	0.71%	1.01%
Native American or Alaska Native alone (NH)	12	29	6	0.74%	1.38%	0.30%
Asian alone (NH)	6	6	19	0.37%	0.29%	0.96%
Native Hawaiian or Pacific Islander alone (NH)	1	2	1	0.06%	0.10%	0.05%
Other race alone (NH)	9	2	13	0.56%	0.10%	0.66%
Mixed race or Multiracial (NH)	35	29	66	2.16%	1.38%	3.34%
Hispanic or Latino (any race)	708	1,350	1,413	43.73%	64.16%	71.47%
Total	1,619	2,104	1,977	100.00%	100.00%	100.00%

=== 2020 census ===
As of the 2020 census, Lakeview had a population of 1,977 and a population density of 606.4 inhabitants per square mile (234.1/km^{2}). The median age was 32.7 years. For every 100 females, there were 93.4 males, and for every 100 females age 18 and over there were 92.0 males age 18 and over.

The age distribution was 510 people (25.8%) under the age of 18, 215 people (10.9%) aged 18 to 24, 558 people (28.2%) aged 25 to 44, 434 people (22.0%) aged 45 to 64, and 260 people (13.2%) who were 65 years of age or older. 90.8% of residents lived in urban areas, while 9.2% lived in rural areas.

The census reported that 1,974 people (99.8%) lived in households, 3 people (0.2%) lived in non-institutionalized group quarters, and no one was institutionalized.

There were 506 households, out of which 197 (38.9%) had children under the age of 18 living in them. Of all households, 304 (60.1%) were married-couple households, 31 (6.1%) were cohabiting couple households, 101 (20.0%) had a female householder with no spouse or partner present, and 70 (13.8%) had a male householder with no spouse or partner present. 76 households (15.0%) were one person, and 39 (7.7%) were one person aged 65 or older. The average household size was 3.9. There were 406 families (80.2% of all households).

There were 550 housing units at an average density of 168.7 units per square mile (65.1 units/km^{2}), of which 506 (92.0%) were occupied and 44 (8.0%) were vacant. Of occupied units, 373 (73.7%) were owner-occupied and 133 (26.3%) were occupied by renters. The homeowner vacancy rate was 1.6% and the rental vacancy rate was 6.3%.

Racial composition as of the 2020 census
Race	Number	Percent
White	607	30.7%
Black or African American	26	1.3%
American Indian and Alaska Native	39	2.0%
Asian	20	1.0%
Native Hawaiian and Other Pacific Islander	1	0.1%
Some other race	968	49.0%
Two or more races	316	16.0%

=== Income and poverty ===
In 2023, the US Census Bureau estimated that the median household income was $63,750, and the per capita income was $47,601. About 14.0% of families and 21.8% of the population were below the poverty line.

=== 2010 census ===
At the 2010 census Lakeview had a population of 2,104. The population density was 645.4 inhabitants per square mile (249.2/km^{2}). The racial makeup of Lakeview was 1,117 (53.1%) White, 15 (0.7%) African American, 48 (2.3%) Native American, 7 (0.3%) Asian, 2 (0.1%) Pacific Islander, 842 (40.0%) from other races, and 73 (3.5%) from two or more races. Hispanic or Latino of any race were 1,350 persons (64.2%).

The census reported that 2,089 people (99.3% of the population) lived in households, 15 (0.7%) lived in non-institutionalized group quarters, and no one was institutionalized.

There were 538 households, 285 (53.0%) had children under the age of 18 living in them, 347 (64.5%) were opposite-sex married couples living together, 63 (11.7%) had a female householder with no husband present, 40 (7.4%) had a male householder with no wife present. There were 31 (5.8%) unmarried opposite-sex partnerships, and 4 (0.7%) same-sex married couples or partnerships. 67 households (12.5%) were one person and 31 (5.8%) had someone living alone who was 65 or older. The average household size was 3.88. There were 450 families (83.6% of households); the average family size was 4.12.

The age distribution was 681 people (32.4%) under the age of 18, 220 people (10.5%) aged 18 to 24, 523 people (24.9%) aged 25 to 44, 494 people (23.5%) aged 45 to 64, and 186 people (8.8%) who were 65 or older. The median age was 30.9 years. For every 100 females, there were 98.1 males. For every 100 females age 18 and over, there were 103.3 males.

There were 599 housing units at an average density of 183.8 per square mile, of the occupied units 390 (72.5%) were owner-occupied and 148 (27.5%) were rented. The homeowner vacancy rate was 1.0%; the rental vacancy rate was 4.5%. 1,475 people (70.1% of the population) lived in owner-occupied housing units and 614 people (29.2%) lived in rental housing units.

== Government ==
In the California State Legislature, Lakeview is in the 31st senatorial district, represented by Democrat Sabrina Cervantes, and the 60th Assembly district, represented by Democrat Corey Jackson.

In the United States House of Representatives, Lakeview is in California's 41st congressional district, represented by Republican Ken Calvert.

== Education ==
It is in the Nuview Union Elementary School District, and the Perris Union High School District for grades 9–12.
