= Perris Elementary School District =

Public school district in Riverside County, California

Address
- 143 East First Street Perris, California, 92570; United States

District information
- Type: Public
- Grades: K–8
- NCES District ID: 0630180

Students and staff
- Students: 5,442 (2020–2021)
- Teachers: 233.4 (on an FTE basis)
- Staff: 233.37 (on an FTE basis)
- Student–teacher ratio: 23.32:1

Other information
- Website: www.perrisesd.org

The Perris Elementary School District is the organization responsible for the administration of public elementary schools (K-6) in the city of Perris, California in the United States. The district currently administers eight elementary schools.

The district is administered by a superintendent and a five-member school board.

The district includes portions of Perris as well as all of the Good Hope census-designated place and parts of Lake Elsinore and parts of the Mead Valley and Meadowbrook CDPs. It feeds into the Perris Union High School District for grades 7-12.

== Schools ==
- Clearwater Elementary School
- Enchanted Hills Elementary School
- Good Hope Elementary School
- Innovative Horizons Charter School at Nan Sanders
- Palms Elementary School
- Perris Elementary School
- Railway Elementary School
- Sky View Elementary School
- Rob Reiner Development Center
