= Romoland, California =

Romoland
- census-designated place
- Location in Riverside County and the state of California

- Location in the United States
- Coordinates: 33°44′45″N 117°10′30″W
- Country: United States
- State: California
- County: Riverside

Area
  - Total: 2.644 sq mi (6.849 km^{2})
  - Land: 2.644 sq mi (6.849 km^{2})
  - Water: 0 sq mi (0 km^{2}) 0%
- Elevation: 1,440 ft (440 m)

Population (2020)
  - Total: 2,005
  - Density: 758.2/sq mi (292.7/km^{2})
- Time zone: UTC-8 (PST)
  - Summer (DST): UTC-7 (PDT)
- ZIP code: 92585
- Area code: 951
- FIPS code: 06-62756
- GNIS feature ID: 1661327

Romoland is a census-designated place (CDP) in Riverside County, California, United States. The population was 2,005 at the 2020 census, up from 1,684 at the 2010 census.

== History ==
On June 25, 1900, the first Ethanac Post Office was established across Highway 74, named after Ethan Allen Chase (an early settler to the area), with John Gaston serving as the first postmaster. In 1925, the town of Ethanac changed to "Romola Farms", developed by the Pacific Mutual Life Insurance Company. The developer sold off small ranches of four to five acres for the cultivation of fig trees, and grapes. The project became so popular that the Ethanac post office would be changed to Romola Farms. When the Post Office Department requested the name change, to avoid confusion with San Diego County's Ramona post office, the name was changed for a final time to Romoland. The origin of the development of the name has never been revealed.

In 1985, Leon E. Motte built the "Motte's Romola Farms" Barn off Highway 74, designed by architect Robert Morris. After building the barn from all salvaged materials, the Mottes sold produce for 10 years before leasing it out to other food vendors, such as Tom's Farms and Hamshaw Farms. In 2011, Motte's Romola Farms reopened as the Motte Historical Museum. The Motte Historical Museum is now a classic car museum and showcases the history of the surrounding valley, as well as documenting the area's agricultural roots. The "Motte's Romola Farms" Barn has always been a longtime landmark on Highway 74.

On October 1, 2008, a significant portion of Romoland became part of the then-newly incorporated City of Menifee.

== Geography ==
Romoland is located at 33°44′45″N 117°10′27″W (33.745783, -117.174228).

According to the United States Census Bureau, the CDP has a total area of 2.6 square miles (6.7 km^{2}), all of it land.

As of the 2000 census, according to the United States Census Bureau, the CDP had a total area of 3.0 square miles (7.8 km^{2}), all of it land.

However, prior to its incorporation into the city of Menifee, California, the Romoland region was considered to encompass the entire unincorporated area between Perris, Homeland, Nuevo, and Menifee. The total population prior to Menifee's incorporation in 2008 may have exceeded 100,000 residents in the 30-square-mile (78 km^{2}) area. To the east, the school district extended to Green Acres, east of Homeland. Menifee and Nuevo have their own school districts. When Sun City was built, Menifee then included the Sun City area.

According to the Geographic Names Information System, the town previously had the toponyms Ethanac and Ethanac Siding.

== Demographics ==
Historical population
Census	Pop.	Note	%±
1980	1,349		—
1990	2,319		71.9%
2000	2,764		19.2%
2010	1,684		−39.1%
2020	2,005		19.1%
U.S. Decennial Census; 1860–1870 1880-1890; 1900 1910 1920; 1930 1940 1950; 1960 1970 1980; 1990 2000 2010

A census designated place under the name Romoland was defined in the 1980 U.S. Census; and then deleted after being incorporated into the city of Menifee in 2008. A new CDP under the same name consisting of area adjacent to the earlier CDP was defined in the 2010 U.S. Census.

=== Racial and ethnic composition ===
Romoland CDP, California – Racial and ethnic composition Note: the US Census treats Hispanic/Latino as an ethnic category. This table excludes Latinos from the racial categories and assigns them to a separate category. Hispanics/Latinos may be of any race.
Race / Ethnicity (NH = Non-Hispanic)	Pop 2000	Pop 2010	Pop 2020	% 2000	% 2010	% 2020
White alone (NH)	1,092	685	570	39.51%	40.68%	28.43%
Black or African American alone (NH)	68	55	93	2.46%	3.27%	4.64%
Native American or Alaska Native alone (NH)	17	4	0	0.62%	0.24%	0.00%
Asian alone (NH)	9	30	70	0.33%	1.78%	3.49%
Native Hawaiian or Pacific Islander alone (NH)	0	2	5	0.00%	0.12%	0.25%
Other race alone (NH)	1	5	11	0.04%	0.30%	0.55%
Mixed race or Multiracial (NH)	47	38	83	1.70%	2.26%	4.14%
Hispanic or Latino (any race)	1,530	865	1,173	55.35%	51.37%	58.50%
Total	2,764	1,684	2,005	100.00%	100.00%	100.00%

=== 2020 census ===
As of the 2020 census, Romoland had a population of 2,005. The population density was 758.3 inhabitants per square mile (292.8/km^{2}). The median age was 33.7 years. 26.8% of residents were under the age of 18 and 10.6% were 65 years of age or older. For every 100 females, there were 105.2 males, and for every 100 females age 18 and over, there were 103.2 males.

58.6% of residents lived in urban areas, while 41.4% lived in rural areas. The Census reported that the whole population lived in households.

There were 533 households, of which 241 (45.2%) had children under the age of 18 living in them. Of all households, 295 (55.3%) were married-couple households, 32 (6.0%) were cohabiting couple households, 103 (19.3%) had a male householder with no spouse or partner present, and 103 (19.3%) had a female householder with no spouse or partner present. 69 households (12.9%) were one person, and 16 (3.0%) were one person aged 65 or older. The average household size was 3.76. There were 444 families (83.3% of all households).

The age distribution was 538 people (26.8%) under the age of 18, 227 people (11.3%) aged 18 to 24, 520 people (25.9%) aged 25 to 44, 508 people (25.3%) aged 45 to 64, and 212 people (10.6%) who were 65 years of age or older.

There were 573 housing units, of which 533 (93.0%) were occupied and 40 (7.0%) were vacant. Of the occupied units, 407 (76.4%) were owner-occupied and 126 (23.6%) were occupied by renters. The homeowner vacancy rate was 4.0% and the rental vacancy rate was 3.7%.

Racial composition as of the 2020 census
Race	Number	Percent
White	751	37.5%
Black or African American	97	4.8%
American Indian and Alaska Native	39	1.9%
Asian	71	3.5%
Native Hawaiian and Other Pacific Islander	8	0.4%
Some other race	682	34.0%
Two or more races	357	17.8%

=== 2010 census ===
At the 2010 census Romoland had a population of 1,684. The population density was 636.8 inhabitants per square mile (245.9/km^{2}). The racial makeup of Romoland was 958 (56.9%) White, 65 (3.9%) African American, 8 (0.5%) Native American, 35 (2.1%) Asian, 12 (0.7%) Pacific Islander, 514 (30.5%) from other races, and 92 (5.5%) from two or more races. Hispanic or Latino of any race were 865 people (51.4%).

The whole population lived in households, no one lived in non-institutionalized group quarters and no one was institutionalized.

There were 455 households, 232 (51.0%) had children under the age of 18 living in them, 287 (63.1%) were opposite-sex married couples living together, 46 (10.1%) had a female householder with no husband present, 34 (7.5%) had a male householder with no wife present. There were 27 (5.9%) unmarried opposite-sex partnerships, and 6 (1.3%) same-sex married couples or partnerships. 61 households (13.4%) were one person and 14 (3.1%) had someone living alone who was 65 or older. The average household size was 3.70. There were 367 families (80.7% of households); the average family size was 4.07.

The age distribution was 502 people (29.8%) under the age of 18, 221 people (13.1%) aged 18 to 24, 395 people (23.5%) aged 25 to 44, 434 people (25.8%) aged 45 to 64, and 132 people (7.8%) who were 65 or older. The median age was 32.0 years. For every 100 females, there were 100.0 males. For every 100 females age 18 and over, there were 100.7 males.

There were 512 housing units at an average density of 193.6 per square mile, of the occupied units 351 (77.1%) were owner-occupied and 104 (22.9%) were rented. The homeowner vacancy rate was 3.3%; the rental vacancy rate was 3.7%. 1,288 people (76.5% of the population) lived in owner-occupied housing units and 396 people (23.5%) lived in rental housing units.

== Politics ==
In the state legislature, Romoland is located in the 31st senatorial district, represented by Democrat Sabrina Cervantes, and in the 60th Assembly district, represented by Democrat Corey Jackson.

In the United States House of Representatives, Romoland is in California's 41st congressional district, represented by Republican Ken Calvert.

== Education ==
It is in the Romoland Elementary School District, and the Perris Union High School District for grades 9–12.
