= Citrus Hill High School =

School in Perris, California, United States

Location
- 18150 Wood Road; Perris, California 92570; United States; 33.856322°N 117.330165°W

Information
- Established: 2005
- School district: Val Verde Unified School District
- Principal: Sarah Allen
- Teaching staff: 81.33 (FTE)
- Grades: 9-12
- Gender: Co-Ed
- Enrollment: 1,630 (2024-2025)
- Average class size: 22 (as of 2020-21)
- Student to teacher ratio: 20.04
- Campus size: 60 acres (240,000 m^{2})
- Campus type: Rural
- Colors: Navy blue Old Glory Red; White
- Slogan: CLASS: Character Leadership Attitude Scholarship Service
- Athletics: CIF Southern Section
- Athletics conference: Mountain Pass League
- Mascot: Hawks
- Rival: Rancho Verde High School
- Website: https://citrushill.valverde.edu

Citrus Hill High School is a secondary public co-ed school serving students of Moreno Valley, Perris and Riverside in the Val Verde Unified School District. The school name refers to the former orange groves.

== History ==
Citrus Hill High School opened on August 18, 2005 with 651 enrollees grades 9-10. Citrus Hill High School (CHHS) is located on 60 acres in the unincorporated area of Perris in the County of Riverside, approximately nine miles southwest of Moreno Valley and three miles southeast of Riverside.

The community in which CHHS has located consists of a primarily rural, residential community with some commercial and retail service businesses.

The school now serves approximately 1,800 students. Students' families are largely nuclear families in the lower to the middle socio-economic range. The most recent demographic data shows Citrus Hill High School has an ethnically-diverse population, with 88% of its students being Hispanic, 4% being Black, 1% being Asian, 0.1% being Native Hawaiian/Pacific Islander, 3% being white, 0.2% being Native American/Alaskan, and 1% being mixed race.

== Academics ==
The school year is divided into two 18-week semesters. Successful completion of each course earns five credits per semester. Academic class size has a maximum enrollment of 33 students per class or a maximum of 165 students per day.

== Activities and organizations ==
Citrus Hill High School provides students with a variety of co-curricular and extra-curricular activities. Currently, there are nearly two dozen academic support/co-curricular clubs active on camps along with sixteen cultural and service clubs which provide students with a large selection of choices for extra curricular activities. In addition, there are sixteen competitive athletic teams, many with three levels of participation.

Previously, the Link Crew program served to train and support upperclassmen mentors for the ninth grade classes. Link Crew leaders had to qualify for the program by maintaining a grade point average of at least 2.5.

The Associated Student Body is in charge of all social activities for the student body. There are student representatives from all grade levels. In order to qualify for ASB, students must maintain a 2.0 grade point average. The program is open to any student who qualifies. ASB has elected-officer positions for the school as a whole and for each grade level. Students are elected to these positions by their grade-level peers and help to facilitate meetings. Excessive discipline issues or not meeting the required GPA serve as cause for removal from the program.

The choral program is an elective program. The three levels of choir offered are; Beginning Choir, Jazz Choir, and Chamber Singers. Chamber Singers meets the University of California and California State University's A-G subject requirements. All groups are performing groups; however, Jazz Choir and especially Chamber Singers compete extensively with other high school choral groups.

Citrus Hill's drama department regularly produces two full productions a year. Once a year, there is a musical uniting effort with band and choir. There are additional showcase performances where students are able to do their class projects for a larger community.

The art program features an annual show where students are able to share selected works with the campus community.

The journalism program used to produce a newspaper named the Talon Times or the Soaring Eye. As of 2023, there is a new newspaper called "The Hawks Post."

The CHHS band program consists of various performance ensembles including Marching Band, Concert Band, Winter Drumline, Percussion Ensemble and the yearly musical performance with the Drama and Choir Departments.

== Athletics ==
The school's athletic teams compete in the CIF Southern Section in the Mountain Pass League. Teams are fielded in baseball, basketball, cross country, football, soccer, softball, swimming, track, volleyball, and wrestling. The teams have won several league championship titles and the football team has won five division championships in addition to holding an Inland Empire record for a 38-game win streak (2007–2009).

Southern Section Division Titles (CIF)

- Football

2007 (14-0)

2008 (14-0)

2012 (14-0)

2013 (13-1)

2015 CIF State Champions (15-2)

- Boys Soccer

2010-11

2016-17 (23-5-2)

- Boys Wrestling

2017-18

- Boys Basketball

2025
