= Nuview Union School District =

Public school district in Riverside County, California

Location
- 29780 Lakeview Ave. Nuevo, California 92567 United States

District information
- Grades: K–12
- Schools: Nuview Bridge Early College High School

Other information
- Website: www.nuviewusd.org

Nuview Union School District is a public school district in Riverside County, California, United States.

It includes Lakeview and most of Nuevo.
