= Meadowbrook, California =

Meadowbrook
- census-designated place
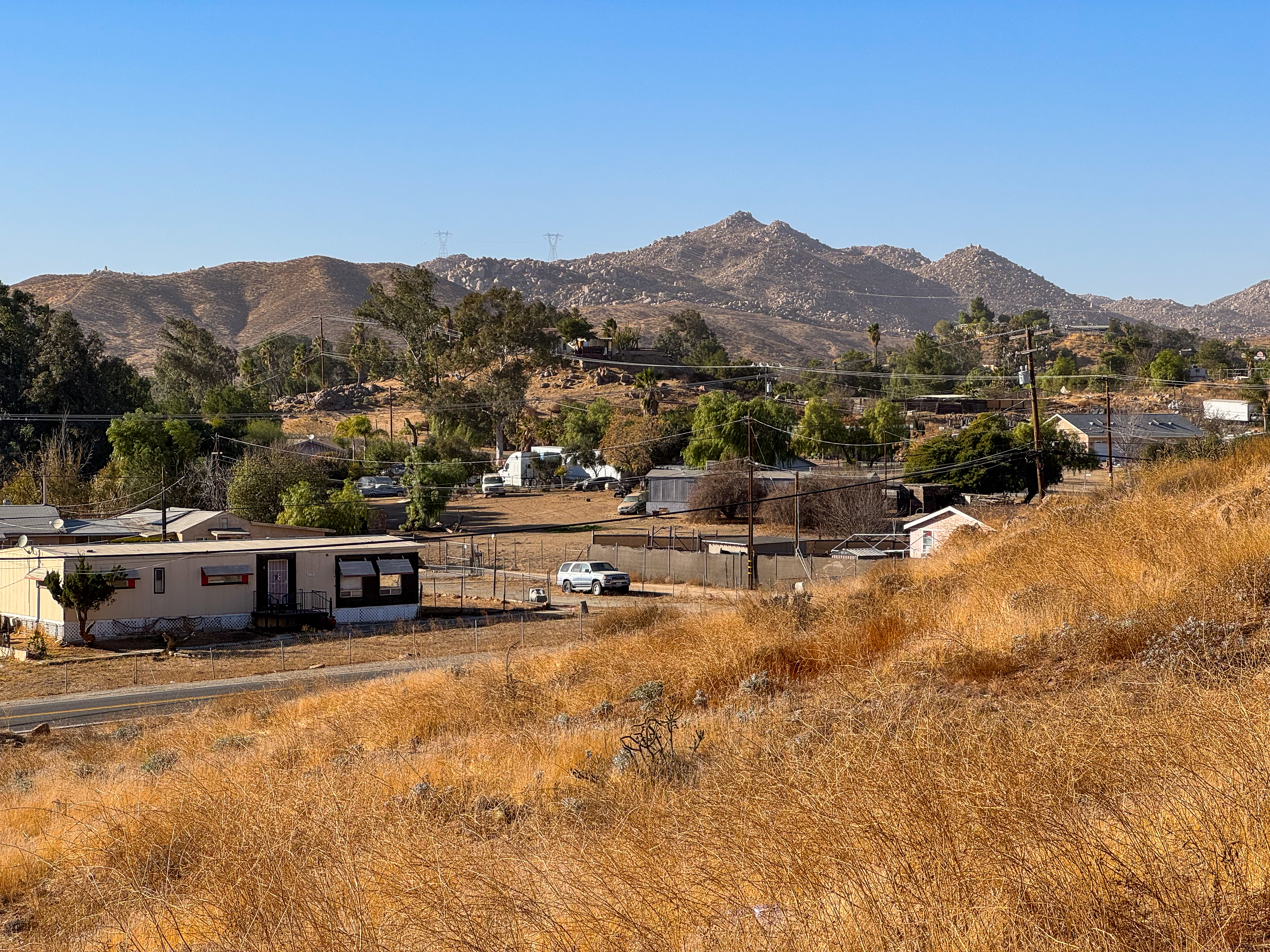
- Peach Street, Meadowbrook, California with Temescal Mountains in the background

- Location in Riverside County, California

- Position in California.
- Coordinates: 33°43′33″N 117°17′06″W
- Country: United States
- State: California
- County: Riverside

Area
  - Total: 6.740 sq mi (17.457 km^{2})
  - Land: 6.717 sq mi (17.396 km^{2})
  - Water: 0.023 sq mi (0.060 km^{2}) 0.35%
- Elevation: 1,621 ft (494 m)

Population (2020)
  - Total: 3,142
  - Density: 467.8/sq mi (180.6/km^{2})
- Time zone: UTC-8 (Pacific (PST))
  - Summer (DST): UTC-7 (PDT)
- GNIS feature ID: 2583076

Meadowbrook is a census-designated place in Riverside County, California. Meadowbrook sits at an elevation of 1,621 feet (494 m). The 2020 United States census reported Meadowbrook's population was 3,142, down from 3,185 at the 2010 census.

== Geography ==
According to the United States Census Bureau, the CDP covers an area of 6.7 square miles (17.5 km^{2}), 99.65% of it land and 0.35% of it water.

== Demographics ==
Historical population
| Census | Pop. | Note | %± |
|---|---|---|---|
| 2010 | 3,185 | | — |
| 2020 | 3,142 | | −1.4% |
U.S. Decennial Census; 1860–1870 1880-1890; 1900 1910 1920; 1930 1940 1950; 1960 1970 1980; 1990 2000 2010

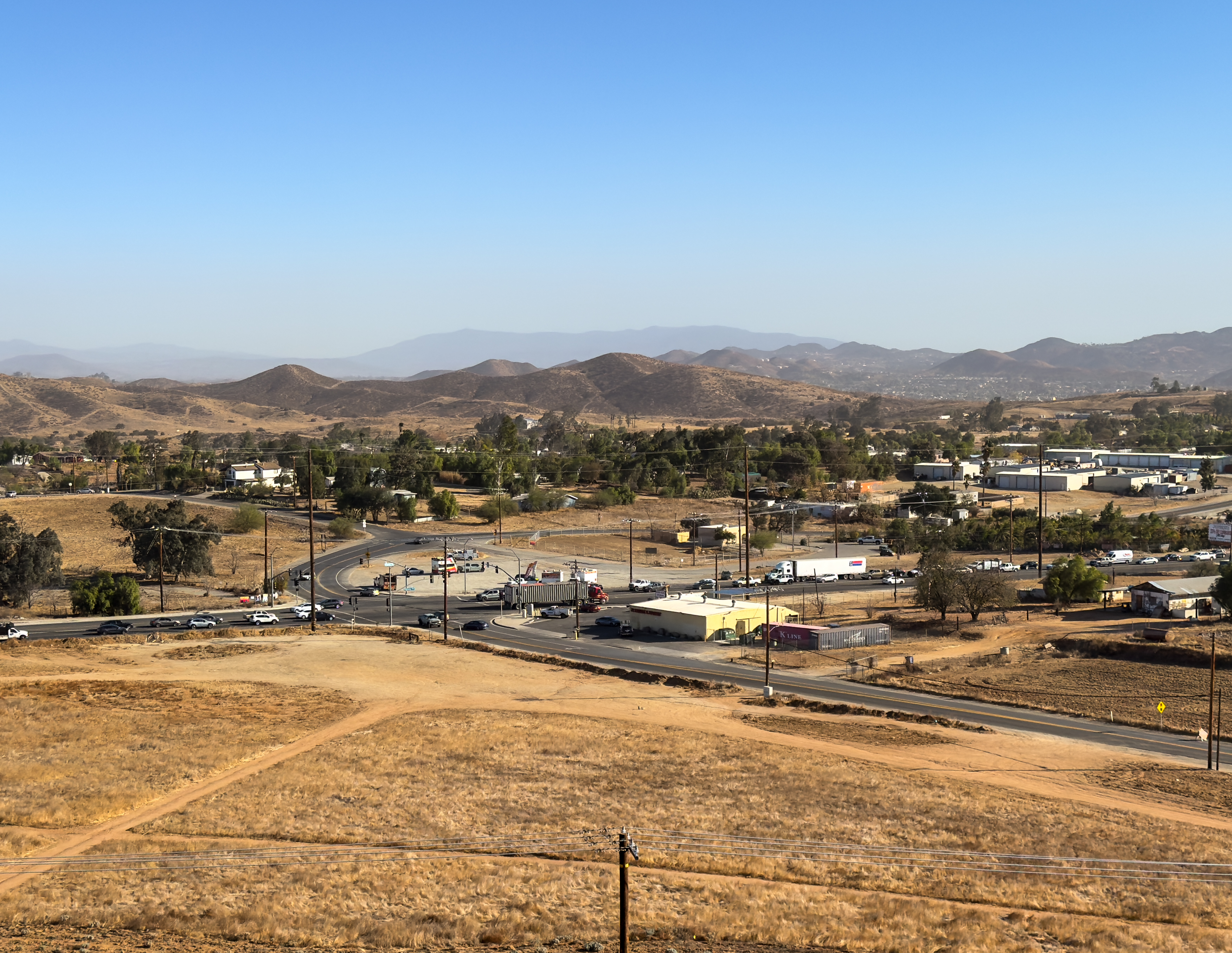
Meadowbrook Ave and California State Route 74 Intersection

Meadowbrook first appeared as a census designated place in the 2000 U.S. census.

=== Racial and ethnic composition ===
Meadowbrook CDP, California – Racial and ethnic composition Note: the US Census treats Hispanic/Latino as an ethnic category. This table excludes Latinos from the racial categories and assigns them to a separate category. Hispanics/Latinos may be of any race.
| Race / Ethnicity (NH = Non-Hispanic) | Pop 2010 | Pop 2020 | % 2010 | % 2020 |
|---|---|---|---|---|
| White alone (NH) | 1,190 | 907 | 37.36% | 28.87% |
| Black or African American alone (NH) | 108 | 73 | 3.39% | 2.32% |
| Native American or Alaska Native alone (NH) | 7 | 20 | 0.22% | 0.64% |
| Asian alone (NH) | 51 | 56 | 1.60% | 1.78% |
| Native Hawaiian or Pacific Islander alone (NH) | 4 | 5 | 0.13% | 0.16% |
| Other race alone (NH) | 4 | 11 | 0.13% | 0.35% |
| Mixed race or Multiracial (NH) | 56 | 86 | 1.76% | 2.74% |
| Hispanic or Latino (any race) | 1,765 | 1,984 | 55.42% | 63.14% |
| Total | 3,185 | 3,142 | 100.00% | 100.00% |

=== 2020 census ===
As of the 2020 census, Meadowbrook had a population of 3,142. The population density was 467.8 inhabitants per square mile (180.6/km^{2}).

The census reported that 99.5% of the population lived in households, 15 people (0.5%) lived in non-institutionalized group quarters, and no one was institutionalized. There were 976 households, out of which 36.9% had children under the age of 18. Of all households, 43.8% were married-couple households, 7.2% were cohabiting couple households, 23.1% had a male householder with no spouse or partner present, and 26.0% had a female householder with no spouse or partner present. 20.8% of households were one person, and 9.4% were one person aged 65 or older. The average household size was 3.2. There were 696 families (71.3% of all households).

The age distribution was 22.9% under the age of 18, 10.0% aged 18 to 24, 25.8% aged 25 to 44, 25.1% aged 45 to 64, and 16.2% who were 65 years of age or older. The median age was 37.3 years. For every 100 females, there were 107.9 males, and for every 100 females age 18 and over there were 110.2 males age 18 and over.

0.0% of residents lived in urban areas, while 100.0% lived in rural areas.

There were 1,097 housing units, of which 976 (89.0%) were occupied and 11.0% were vacant. Of occupied units, 66.3% were owner-occupied and 33.7% were occupied by renters. The homeowner vacancy rate was 2.2% and the rental vacancy rate was 4.0%.

Racial composition as of the 2020 census
| Race | Number | Percent |
|---|---|---|
| White | 1,187 | 37.8% |
| Black or African American | 77 | 2.5% |
| American Indian and Alaska Native | 87 | 2.8% |
| Asian | 58 | 1.8% |
| Native Hawaiian and Other Pacific Islander | 6 | 0.2% |
| Some other race | 1,201 | 38.2% |
| Two or more races | 526 | 16.7% |

== Education ==
Some parts are zoned to the Lake Elsinore Unified School District. Other parts are zoned to the Perris Elementary School District and the Perris Union High School District for grades 7-12.
