= Good Hope, California =

- census-designated place
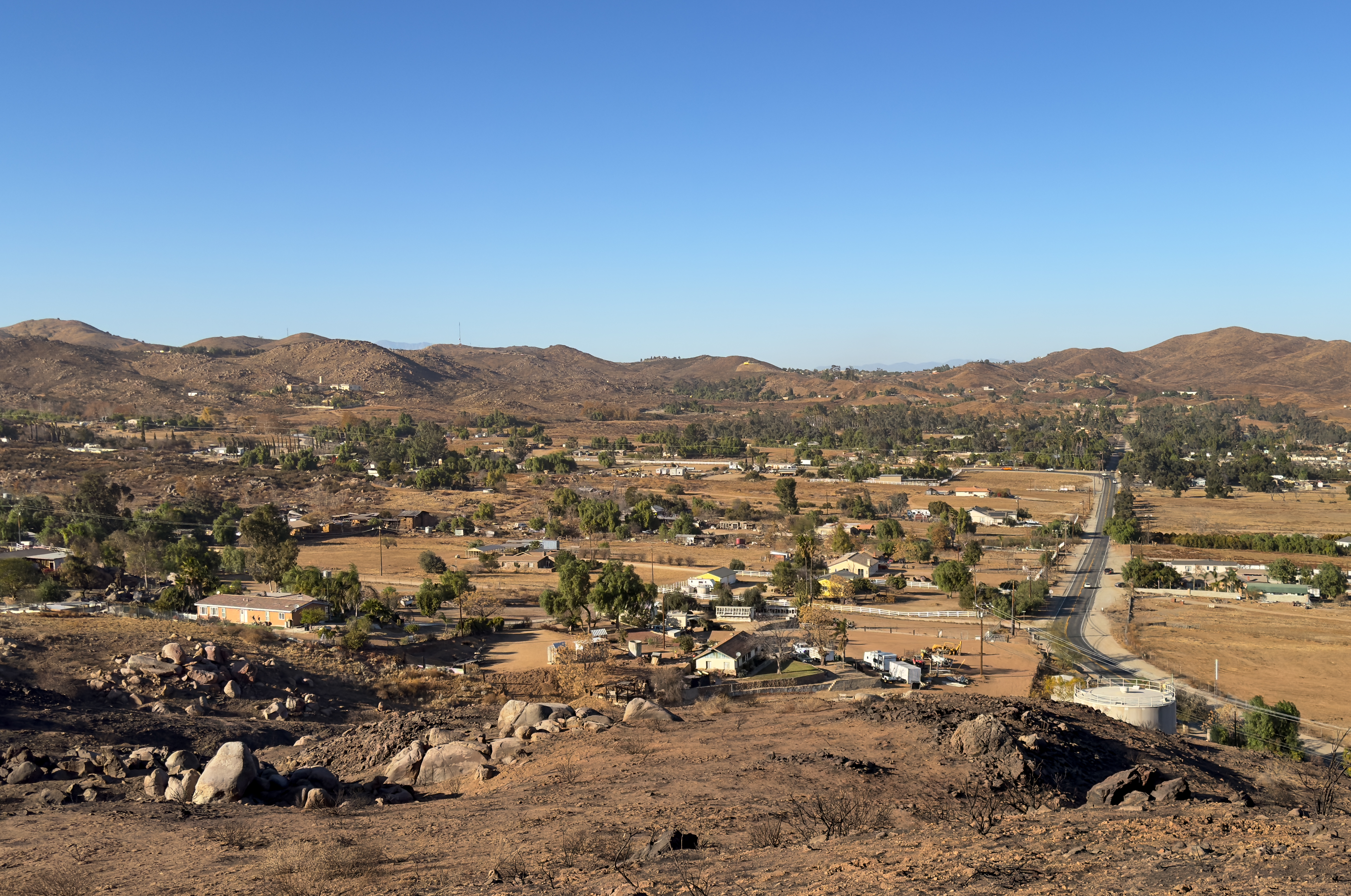
- Santa Rosa Mine Road, Good Hope, California

- Location of Good Hope in Riverside County, California.

- Position in California.
- Coordinates: 33°46′14″N 117°16′38″W
- Country: United States
- State: California
- County: Riverside

Area
  - Total: 11.234 sq mi (29.097 km^{2})
  - Land: 11.234 sq mi (29.097 km^{2})
  - Water: 0 sq mi (0 km^{2}) 0%
- Elevation: 1,624 ft (495 m)

Population (2020)
  - Total: 9,468
  - Density: 842.8/sq mi (325.4/km^{2})
- Time zone: UTC-8 (Pacific (PST))
  - Summer (DST): UTC-7 (PDT)
- ZIP code: 92570
- Area code: 951
- GNIS feature ID: 2583026

Good Hope is a census-designated place in the Inland Empire region of Riverside County, California. Good Hope sits at an elevation of 1,624 feet (495 m). The 2020 United States census reported Good Hope's population was 9,468.

== Geography ==
According to the United States Census Bureau, the CDP covers an area of 11.2 square miles (29.1 km^{2}), all of it land.

=== Climate ===
The climate in this area is described by the Köppen Climate Classification System as "dry-summer subtropical" often referred to as "Mediterranean" and abbreviated as Csa.

Climate data for Good Hope, CA
Month	Jan	Feb	Mar	Apr	May	Jun	Jul	Aug	Sep	Oct	Nov	Dec	Year
Mean daily maximum °F (°C)	63 (17)	67 (19)	69 (21)	74 (23)	80 (27)	87 (31)	96 (36)	96 (36)	96 (36)	87 (31)	74 (23)	66 (19)	80 (27)
Mean daily minimum °F (°C)	36 (2)	37 (3)	39 (4)	43 (6)	47 (8)	50 (10)	57 (14)	57 (14)	55 (13)	46 (8)	41 (5)	37 (3)	45 (7)
Average precipitation inches (mm)	3.8 (97)	0.9 (23)	1.6 (41)	0.9 (23)	0.4 (10)	0 (0)	0.1 (2.5)	0 (0)	0.2 (5.1)	0 (0)	1.2 (30)	1.5 (38)	10.7 (270)
Source: Weatherbase

== Demographics ==
Historical population
Census	Pop.	Note	%±
2010	9,192		—
2020	9,468		3.0%
U.S. Decennial Census; 1860–1870 1880-1890; 1900 1910 1920; 1930 1940 1950; 1960 1970 1980; 1990 2000 2010

Good Hope first appeared as a census designated place in the 2010 U.S. census.

=== Racial and ethnic composition ===
Good Hope CDP, California – Racial and ethnic composition Note: the US Census treats Hispanic/Latino as an ethnic category. This table excludes Latinos from the racial categories and assigns them to a separate category. Hispanics/Latinos may be of any race.
Race / Ethnicity (NH = Non-Hispanic)	Pop 2010	Pop 2020	% 2010	% 2020
White alone (NH)	1,095	731	11.91%	7.72%
Black or African American alone (NH)	608	347	6.61%	3.66%
Native American or Alaska Native alone (NH)	25	17	0.27%	0.18%
Asian alone (NH)	59	50	0.64%	0.53%
Native Hawaiian or Pacific Islander alone (NH)	3	3	0.03%	0.03%
Other race alone (NH)	2	34	0.02%	0.36%
Mixed race or Multiracial (NH)	81	125	0.88%	1.32%
Hispanic or Latino (any race)	7,319	8,161	79.62%	86.20%
Total	9,192	9,468	100.00%	100.00%

=== 2020 census ===
As of the 2020 census, Good Hope had a population of 9,468 and a population density of 842.8 inhabitants per square mile (325.4/km^{2}). The median age was 30.2 years. The age distribution was 29.6% under the age of 18, 11.9% aged 18 to 24, 26.4% aged 25 to 44, 22.6% aged 45 to 64, and 9.5% aged 65 or older. For every 100 females, there were 107.4 males, and for every 100 females age 18 and over, there were 106.9 males age 18 and over.

The census reported that 99.9% of the population lived in households, 7 people (0.1%) lived in non-institutionalized group quarters, and no one was institutionalized.

79.0% of residents lived in urban areas, while 21.0% lived in rural areas.

There were 2,198 households, of which 52.5% included children under the age of 18. Of all households, 54.3% were married-couple households, 7.2% were cohabiting couple households, 20.2% had a female householder with no spouse or partner present, and 18.2% had a male householder with no spouse or partner present. About 10.6% of households were one person, and 4.1% had someone living alone who was 65 years of age or older. The average household size was 4.3. There were 1,872 families (85.2% of all households).

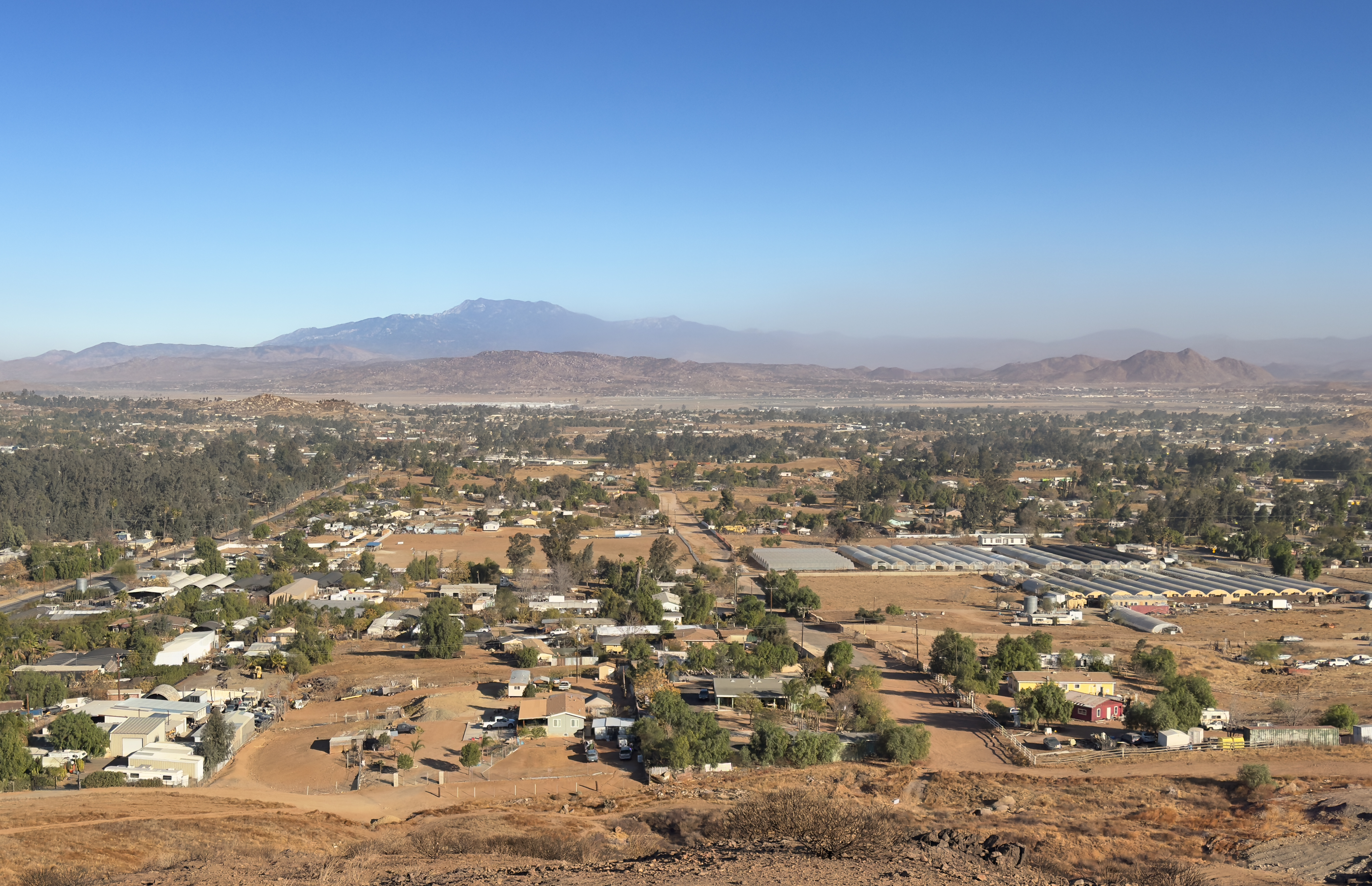
Good Hope, California with San Jacinto Peak in the background

There were 2,338 housing units at an average density of 208.1 units per square mile (80.3 units/km^{2}), of which 2,198 (94.0%) were occupied. Of occupied units, 60.5% were owner-occupied and 39.5% were occupied by renters. The vacancy rate was 6.0%, with a homeowner vacancy rate of 1.1% and a rental vacancy rate of 4.4%.

Racial composition as of the 2020 census
Race	Number	Percent
White	1,741	18.4%
Black or African American	388	4.1%
American Indian and Alaska Native	167	1.8%
Asian	63	0.7%
Native Hawaiian and Other Pacific Islander	3	0.0%
Some other race	5,082	53.7%
Two or more races	2,024	21.4%

=== Demographic estimates ===
In 2023, the US Census Bureau estimated that 29.9% of the population were foreign-born. Of all people aged 5 or older, 34.7% spoke only English at home, 64.8% spoke Spanish, and 0.5% spoke Asian or Pacific Islander languages. Of those aged 25 or older, 64.9% were high school graduates and 4.3% had a bachelor's degree.

=== Income and poverty ===
The median household income in 2023 was $56,328, and the per capita income was $19,511. About 20.2% of families and 27.6% of the population were below the poverty line.

== Education ==
Residents are zoned to the Perris Elementary School District and the Perris Union High School District for grades 7-12.
