= Farmer Boys (fast casual chain) =

Restaurant chain in California

Farmer Boys Franchising Co.

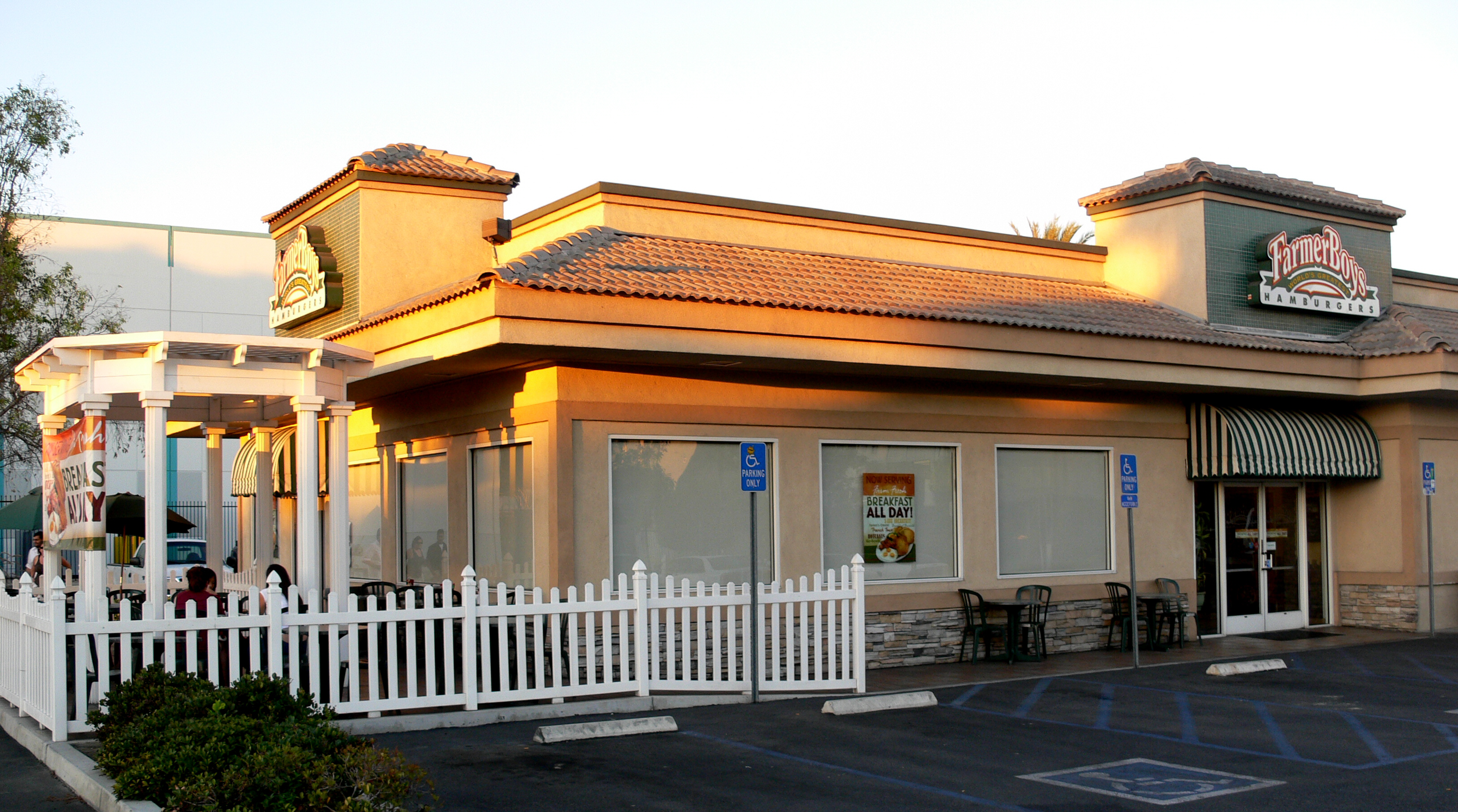
- Farmer Boys restaurant in Los Angeles
- Industry: Food Franchising
- Genre: Fast casual restaurant
- Founded: 1981; 45 years ago Perris, California, United States
- Headquarters: Riverside, California, United States
- Number of locations: over 100 (2022)
- Area served: Arizona; California; Colorado; Nevada
- Key people: Joseph Oritz (President, COO)

Farmer Boys is a fast casual chain that operates primarily in California. Its headquarters are located in Riverside, California.

== History ==
Farmer Boys was founded by the Havadjias brothers in 1981. The Havadjias family were immigrants from Cyprus. The brothers originally owned Astro Burgers in Torrance, California in 1979 and Theodore's Restaurant in Hollywood, California in 1981 prior to owning McCoy's Restaurant in Perris, California. McCoy's Restaurant became the first Farmer Boys restaurant following the name change in August 1981. About 16 years later, Farmer Boys had grown to eight restaurants. A year later, Farmer Boys was granted franchise status and later in the year, a Farmer Boys restaurant opened in Temecula, California.

As of 2022, there were more than 100 Farmer Boys restaurants in Arizona, California and Nevada.

In February 2020, Farmer Boys temporarily changed its name to "Farmer Girls" to celebrate Women's History Month and International Women's Day. They gave their bacon burger a new name: "Bacon Girl." The name change was also to honor the chain's 1,600 plus female staff members who help run the business.

In mid-March 2020, as a result of the COVID-19 pandemic Farmer Boys temporarily shut down its dining room. Drive-thru, delivery, takeout and pick up service were offered.

In 2021, Farmer Boys expanded into Arizona, the restaurant's third state of operation after California and Nevada. Gilbert, Arizona was the first location.

In 2022, Farmer Boys promoted Joseph Oritz to president and chief executive operator.

Two years later, Colorado saw the restaurant's expansion into their state, with locations like Denver, Colorado Springs, Fort Collins and Pueblo planned.

== See also ==
- List of hamburger restaurants
