= Romoland School District =

Public school district in Riverside County, California

Location
- 25900 Leon Road; Homeland, California 92548 Riverside County United States

District information
- Type: Public
- Grades: TK–8
- Superintendent: Trevor J. Painton
- Schools: Boulder Ridge Elementary; Harvest Valley Elementary; Mesa View Elementary; Romoland Elementary; Ethan A. Chase Middle School; Hillside Innovation Academy (TK-8)

Students and staff
- Students: 4,550
- Staff: 456

Other information
- Website: www.romoland.net

Romoland School District is a TK–8 public school district based in Riverside County, California, United States serving over 4,500 students.

The district territory includes Romoland, Homeland, and portions of Green Acres, Nuevo, Perris, and Menifee.

Romoland School District has been recognized by Google for Education as a Reference District.

== Elementary schools ==
- Romoland Elementary School
- Harvest Valley Elementary School
- Boulder Ridge Elementary School
- Mesa View Elementary School

== Middle school ==
- Ethan A. Chase Middle School

== TK-8 School of Choice ==
- Hillside Innovation Academy
