= Double Butte =

Mountain in Riverside County, CA

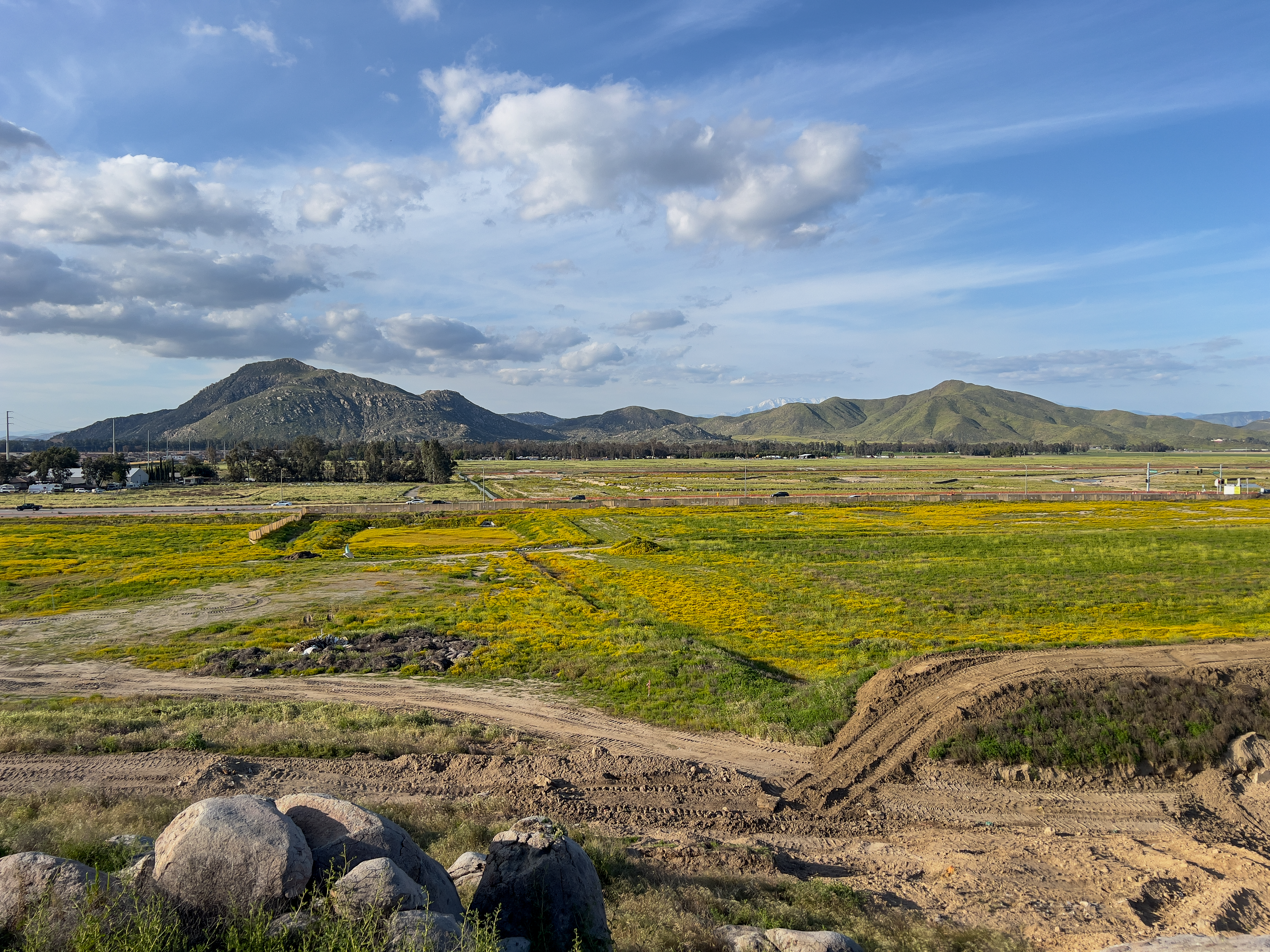
- Double Butte Mountain viewed from the south in Winchester, California

Highest point
- Elevation: 2,579 ft (786 m) NAVD 88
- Prominence: 914 ft (279 m)
- Coordinates: 33°43′26″N 117°07′23″W

Geography
- Location within California Location within the United States
- Location: Riverside County, California, U.S.
- Parent range: Double Butte Mountains
- Topo map: USGS Winchester

Geology
- Mountain type: Granitic

Climbing
- Easiest route: Hike

Double Butte is a mountain distinguished by two buttes, the highest being the western summit at about 2,579 feet or 786 metres and the lesser summit being 2,480 feet or 756 metres. It is located in Riverside County, California.

== History ==
To the east of the Double Butte, there is a disposal site landfill around the area, but it has been closed in recent years.

== Geography ==
The Double Butte County Regional Park is located in the canyon in the middle of the south side of the range. By 2014, the County Regional Park was still undeveloped and closed to the public.

It is the westernmost summit of a mountain range north of Winchester, California, east of Perris Valley and west of the San Jacinto Valley. The eastern ridge is composed primarily of metamorphic rock of the Triassic - Jurassic French Valley formation. The remainder of the Double Butte range is composed primarily of Cretaceous granitic rock.

== Hiking ==
Two hiking trails exist on the mountain, one to the peak and the other along its west face.

Two climbing sites are located on its west face.
