= Perris, California =

City in California, United States

- City
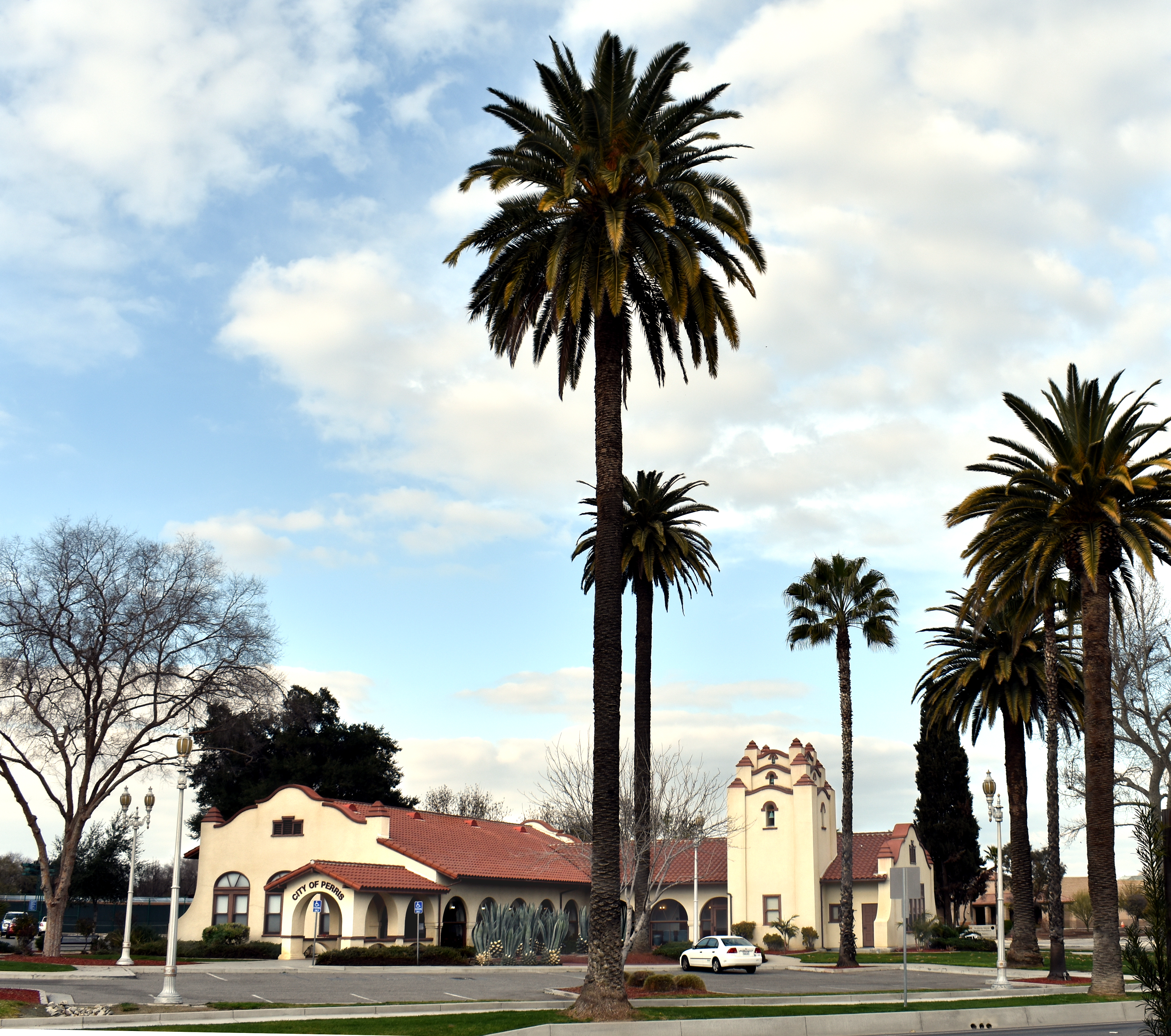
- Perris Civic Center

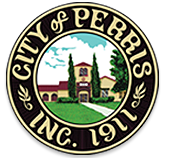
- Seal
- Interactive map of Perris, California
- Location in the United States Perris (the United States)
- Coordinates: 33°47′48″N 117°13′28″W
- Country: United States
- State: California
- County: Riverside
- Incorporated: May 26, 1911

Government
  - Type: Council-manager
  - Mayor: Michael M. Vargas
  - Mayor Pro Tem: David Starr Rabb
  - City Council: Malcolm Corona; Marisela Nava; Elizabeth Vallejo

Area
  - Total: 31.64 sq mi (81.95 km^{2})
  - Land: 31.53 sq mi (81.67 km^{2})
  - Water: 0.11 sq mi (0.28 km^{2}) 0.34%
- Elevation: 1,453 ft (443 m)

Population (2020)
  - Total: 78,700
  - Estimate (2024): 83,032
  - Density: 2,496/sq mi (963.6/km^{2})
- Time zone: UTC−8 (Pacific)
  - Summer (DST): UTC−7 (PDT)
- ZIP Codes: 92570–92572, 92599
- Area code: 951
- FIPS code: 06-56700
- GNIS feature IDs: 1652772, 2411403
- Website: cityofperris.org

Perris is an old railway city in Riverside County, California, United States, located 71 miles (114 km) east-southeast of Los Angeles and 81 miles (130 km) north of San Diego. It is known for Lake Perris, skydiving, the Southern California Railway Museum, and its sunny dry climate. Perris is within the Inland Empire metropolitan area and within the Greater Los Angeles area. Perris had a population of 78,700 as of the 2020 census.

== History ==
Native Americans inhabited the hills. Gold deposits were found when Spanish and Mexican miners entered the area.

The coming of the California Southern Railroad led to the founding of the city around the new depot, on the rail connection between the present-day cities of Barstow and San Diego. The Perris Depot is included in the Library of Congress’ Historic American Buildings Survey. Due to a land title dispute at Pinacate, most of its citizens moved two miles north on the railroad and established Perris in 1885. The city is named in honor of Fred T. Perris, chief engineer of the California Southern Railroad. The city of Perris was incorporated in 1911. It originally was within San Diego County but, in 1892, it was transferred to the newly established Riverside County.

In 2005, the National Archives and Records Administration opened the National Archives at Riverside, which is its regional branch for federal documents relating to the Pacific Region (Arizona, southern California, and Clark County, Nevada) in Perris.

== Geography ==
According to the United States Census Bureau, the city has a total area of 31.64 square miles (81.9 km^{2}), of which, 31.53 square miles (81.7 km^{2}) of it is land and 0.11 square miles (0.28 km^{2}) of it (0.34%) is water.

=== Climate ===
Perris has a Mediterranean climate, with long, hot summers and short, mild winters. The climate in this area is described by the Köppen Climate Classification System as "dry-summer subtropical" often referred to as "Mediterranean" and abbreviated as Csa.

Climate data for Perris, California
Month	Jan	Feb	Mar	Apr	May	Jun	Jul	Aug	Sep	Oct	Nov	Dec	Year
Record high °F (°C)	87 (31)	99 (37)	95 (35)	98 (37)	106 (41)	107 (42)	110 (43)	110 (43)	114 (46)	101 (38)	94 (34)	84 (29)	114 (46)
Mean daily maximum °F (°C)	65.3 (18.5)	68.1 (20.1)	68.3 (20.2)	74.2 (23.4)	79.6 (26.4)	85.3 (29.6)	96.7 (35.9)	96.9 (36.1)	90.8 (32.7)	82.5 (28.1)	72.0 (22.2)	64.5 (18.1)	78.7 (25.9)
Daily mean °F (°C)	50.0 (10.0)	52.8 (11.6)	53.6 (12.0)	57.9 (14.4)	63.5 (17.5)	68.5 (20.3)	77.1 (25.1)	77.8 (25.4)	72.0 (22.2)	64.8 (18.2)	56.2 (13.4)	49.7 (9.8)	62.0 (16.7)
Mean daily minimum °F (°C)	34.7 (1.5)	37.5 (3.1)	38.9 (3.8)	41.6 (5.3)	47.5 (8.6)	51.7 (10.9)	57.4 (14.1)	58.7 (14.8)	53.2 (11.8)	47.1 (8.4)	40.5 (4.7)	34.9 (1.6)	45.3 (7.4)
Record low °F (°C)	17 (−8)	23 (−5)	23 (−5)	25 (−4)	34 (1)	37 (3)	41 (5)	41 (5)	38 (3)	26 (−3)	24 (−4)	12 (−11)	12 (−11)
Average precipitation inches (mm)	1.63 (41)	1.93 (49)	1.29 (33)	1.04 (26)	0.16 (4.1)	0.06 (1.5)	0.33 (8.4)	0.06 (1.5)	0.35 (8.9)	0.14 (3.6)	1.97 (50)	1.45 (37)	10.42 (265)
Average snowfall inches (cm)	0.2 (0.51)	0 (0)	0 (0)	0 (0)	0 (0)	0 (0)	0 (0)	0 (0)	0 (0)	0 (0)	0 (0)	0.2 (0.51)	0.3 (0.76)
Average precipitation days	4	5	5	4	1	1	1	0	1	1	3	5	30
Source: Western Regional Climate Center

== Demographics ==
=== Racial and ethnic composition ===
Perris, California – Racial and ethnic composition Note: the US Census treats Hispanic/Latino as an ethnic category. This table excludes Latinos from the racial categories and assigns them to a separate category. Hispanics/Latinos may be of any race.
Race / Ethnicity (NH = Non-Hispanic)	Pop 1980	Pop 1990	Pop 2000	Pop 2010	Pop 2020	% 1980	% 1990	% 2000	% 2010	% 2020
White alone (NH)	3,920	10,265	8,243	7,499	6,335	57.42%	47.83%	22.78%	10.97%	8.04%
Black or African American alone (NH)	668	2,637	5,574	7,763	7,705	9.78%	12.29%	15.40%	11.35%	9.78%
Native American or Alaska Native alone (NH)	124	142	156	154	184	1.82%	0.66%	0.43%	0.23%	0.23%
Asian alone (NH)	115	642	940	2,285	2,723	1.68%	2.99%	2.60%	3.34%	3.46%
Native Hawaiian or Pacific Islander alone (NH)	115	642	101	259	220	1.68%	2.99%	0.30%	0.38%	0.28%
Other race alone (NH)	-	70	60	143	462	-	0.33%	0.17%	0.21%	0.59%
Mixed race or Multiracial (NH)	x	x	793	1,204	1,500	x	x	2.19%	1.76%	1.90%
Hispanic or Latino (any race)	2,000	7,704	20,322	49,079	59,571	29.30%	35.90%	56.16%	71.77%	75.63%
Total	6,827	21,460	36,189	68,386	78,700	100.00%	100.00%	100.00%	100.00%	100.00%

=== 2020 census ===
As of the 2020 census, Perris had a population of 78,700. The population density was 2,495.7 inhabitants per square mile (963.6/km^{2}). The median age was 29.5 years. The age distribution was 31.2% under the age of 18, 11.7% aged 18 to 24, 28.6% aged 25 to 44, 21.1% aged 45 to 64, and 7.4% aged 65 or older. For every 100 females, there were 98.1 males; for every 100 females age 18 and over, there were 95.3 males.

The census reported that 99.7% of the population lived in households, 0.2% lived in non-institutionalized group quarters, and 0.1% were institutionalized. In addition, 99.2% of residents lived in urban areas, while 0.8% lived in rural areas.

There were 19,027 households, of which 59.0% had children under the age of 18. Of all households, 55.8% were married-couple households, 7.8% were cohabiting couple households, 14.0% had a male householder with no spouse or partner present, and 22.4% had a female householder with no spouse or partner present. About 8.7% of households were made up of individuals, and 3.1% had someone living alone who was 65 or older. The average household size was 4.12. There were 16,647 families, representing 87.5% of households.

There were 19,424 housing units at an average density of 616.0 units per square mile (237.8 units/km^{2}), of which 2.0% were vacant. Of the 19,027 occupied housing units, 65.4% were owner-occupied and 34.6% were renter-occupied. The homeowner vacancy rate was 0.6%, and the rental vacancy rate was 2.6%.

Racial composition as of the 2020 census
Race	Number	Percent
White	14,816	18.8%
Black or African American	8,242	10.5%
American Indian and Alaska Native	1,729	2.2%
Asian	2,912	3.7%
Native Hawaiian and Other Pacific Islander	273	0.3%
Some other race	36,062	45.8%
Two or more races	14,666	18.6%

=== 2023 ACS 5-year estimates ===
In 2023, the US Census Bureau estimated that 29.8% of the population were foreign-born. Of all people aged 5 or older, 34.0% spoke only English at home, 62.5% spoke Spanish, 0.5% spoke other Indo-European languages, 1.9% spoke Asian or Pacific Islander languages, and 1.0% spoke other languages. Of those aged 25 or older, 70.9% were high school graduates and 11.6% had a bachelor's degree.

The median household income in 2023 was $82,523, and the per capita income was $24,862. About 9.3% of families and 11.9% of the population were below the poverty line.

=== 2010 census ===
At the 2010 census Perris had a population of 68,386. The population density was 2,170.7 inhabitants per square mile (838.1/km^{2}). The racial makeup of Perris was 28,937 (42.3%) White (11.0% Non-Hispanic White), 8,307 (12.1%) African American, 589 (0.9%) Native American, 2,461 (3.6%) Asian, 286 (0.4%) Pacific Islander, 24,345 (35.6%) from other races, and 3,461 (5.1%) from two or more races. Hispanic or Latino of any race were 49,079 persons (71.8%).

The census reported that 68,146 people (99.7% of the population) lived in households, 140 (0.2%) lived in non-institutionalized group quarters, and 100 (0.1%) were institutionalized.

There were 16,365 households: 10,836 (66.2%) had children under the age of 18 living in them; 9,778 (59.7%) were opposite-sex married couples living together; 3,128 (19.1%) had a female householder with no husband present; 1,441 (8.8%) had a male householder with no wife present. There were 1,314 (8.0%) unmarried opposite-sex partnerships, and 120 (0.7%) same-sex married couples or partnerships. 1,442 households (8.8%) were one person and 383 (2.3%) had someone living alone who was 65 or older. The average household size was 4.16. There were 14,347 families (87.7% of households); the average family size was 4.32.

The age distribution was 25,288 people (37.0%) under the age of 18, 7,951 people (11.6%) aged 18 to 24, 20,088 people (29.4%) aged 25 to 44, 11,711 people (17.1%) aged 45 to 64, and 3,348 people (4.9%) who were 65 or older. The median age was 25.9 years. For every 100 females, there were 98.3 males. For every 100 females age 18 and over, there were 93.9 males.

There were 17,906 housing units at an average density of 568.4 per square mile, of the occupied units 10,854 (66.3%) were owner-occupied and 5,511 (33.7%) were rented. The homeowner vacancy rate was 5.5%; the rental vacancy rate was 6.8%. 44,695 people (65.4% of the population) lived in owner-occupied housing units and 23,451 people (34.3%) lived in rental housing units.

According to the 2010 United States Census, Perris had a median household income of $46,435, with 28.2% of the population living below the federal poverty line.

== Economy ==
=== Top employers ===
According to Perris's 2022 Comprehensive Annual Financial Report, the top employers in the city are:

#	Employer	# of Employees
1	Ross Stores, Inc.	2,193
2	Val Verde Unified School District	1,493
3	Perris Union High School District	1,106
4	Lowe's Distribution Center	926
5	Home Depot Distribution Center	905
6	Perris Elementary School District	701
7	NFI Industries	612
8	Eastern Municipal Water District	600
9	Walmart Supercenter	430
10	C R & R Waste	238

== Arts and culture ==
The Southern California Railway Museum is the largest operating museum of its kind on the West Coast of the United States. The Southern California Fair has been held at the Lake Perris Fairgrounds since 1987.

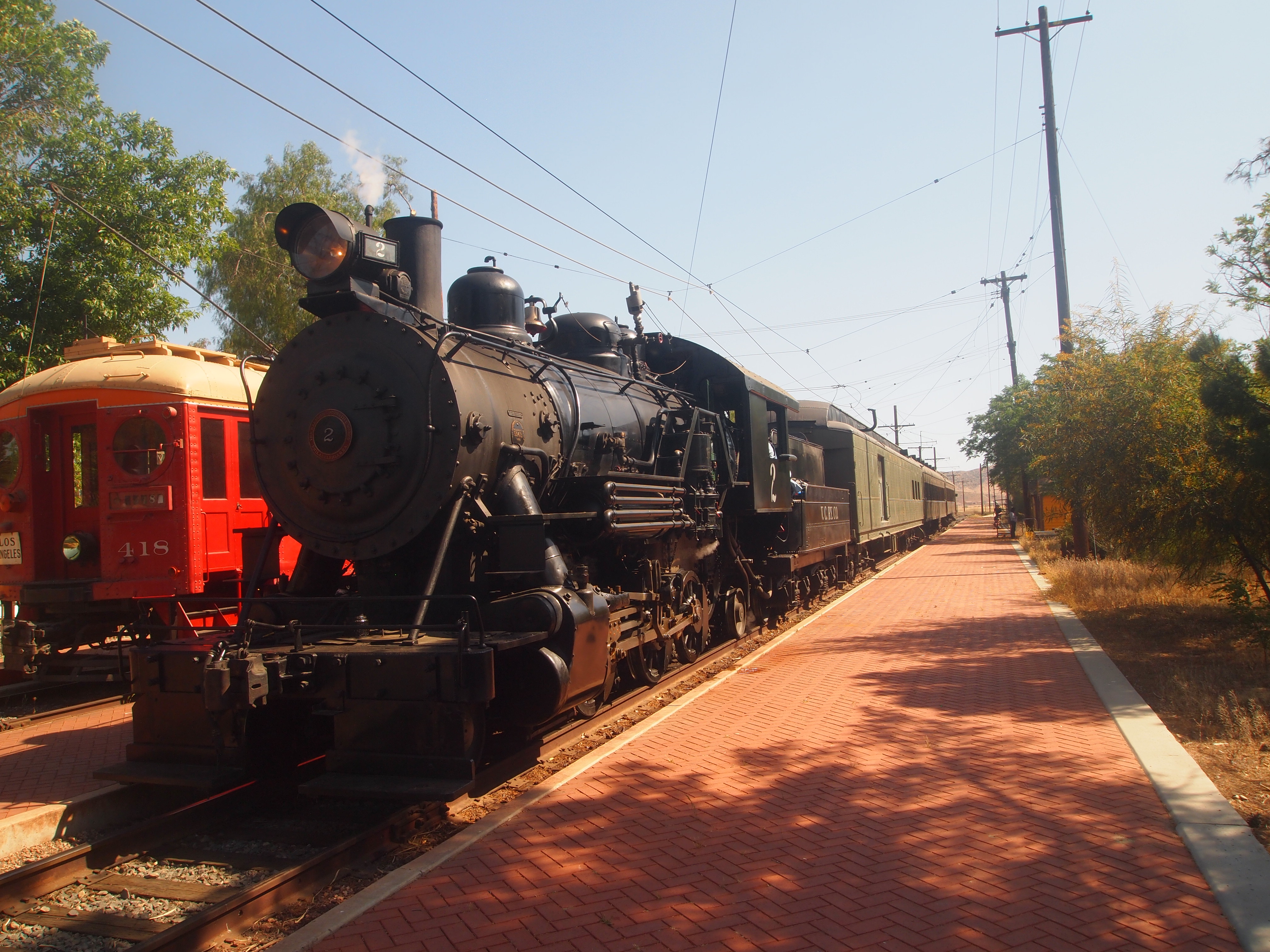
The Southern California Railway Museum has over 200 streetcars, locomotives and other rolling stock.

The Farmer Boys restaurant chain, which has many locations throughout the Inland Empire, was started in Perris in 1981.

Rock Castle house is set on a hill above town.

== Government ==
United States presidential election results for Perris, California
Year	Republican		Democratic		Third party(ies)	
Year	No.	%	No.	%	No.	%
2000	2,121	34.13%	3,891	62.61%	203	3.27%
2004	3,211	41.66%	4,406	57.17%	90	1.17%
2008	2,946	26.51%	8,016	72.14%	149	1.34%
2012	2,782	20.56%	10,539	77.91%	207	1.53%
2016	3,211	19.06%	12,667	75.19%	969	5.75%
2020	5,980	27.15%	15,588	70.78%	455	2.07%
2024	7,759	39.17%	11,477	57.94%	571	2.88%

In the California State Legislature, Perris is in the 31st senatorial district, represented by Democrat Sabrina Cervantes, and in the 60th Assembly district, represented by Democrat Corey Jackson.

In the United States House of Representatives, Perris is in California's 39th congressional district, represented by Democrat Mark Takano.

== Education ==
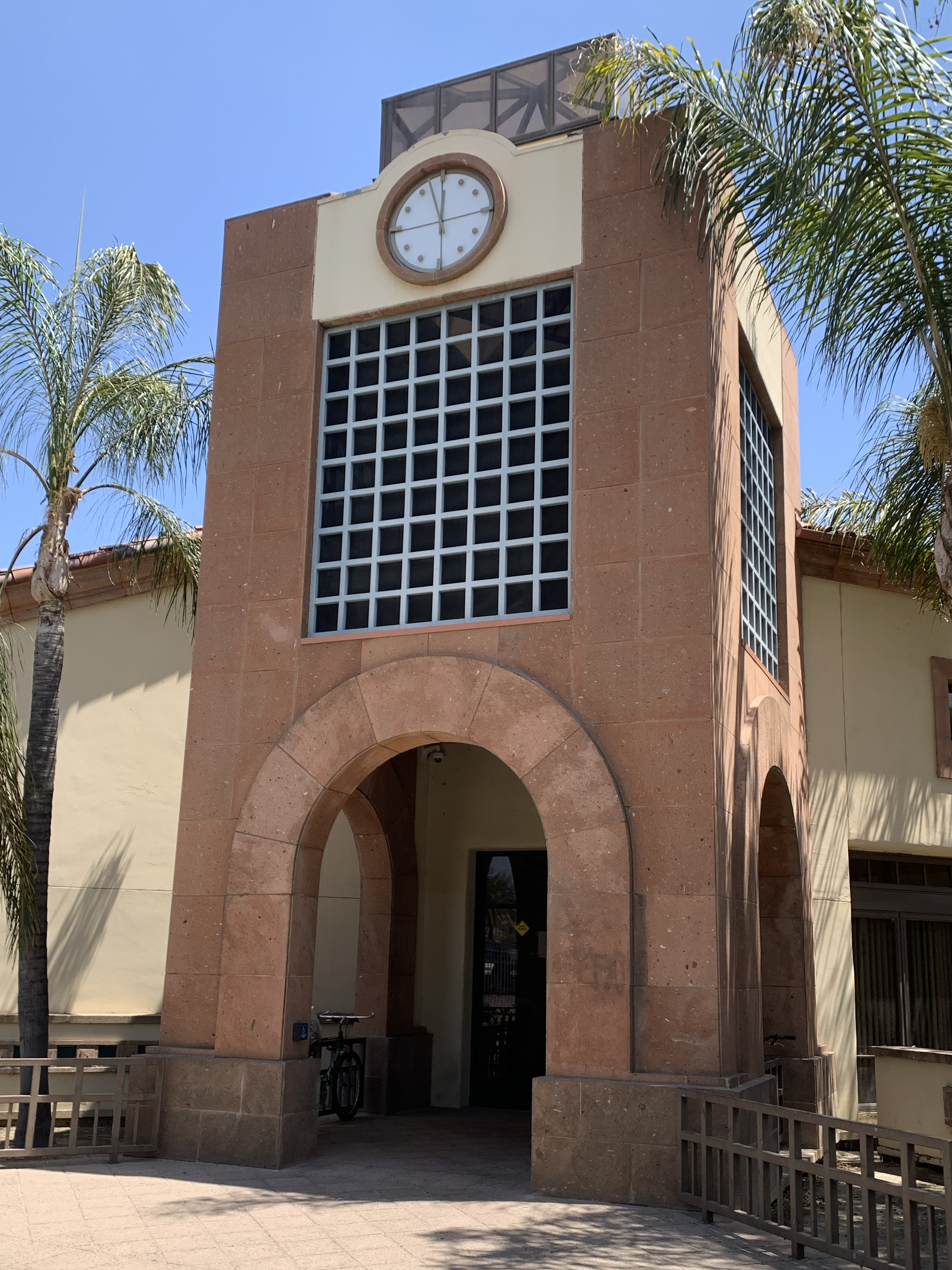
Cesar E. Chavez Library in downtown Perris

The city is served by several school districts. In portions, they are:

- The Perris Elementary School District and the Perris Union High School District (the latter also serves Menifee)
- The Romoland Elementary School District and Perris UHSD (for grades 9-12)
- The Menifee Union School District and Perris UHSD (for grades 9-12)
- The Val Verde Unified School District, which also serves the southern part of Moreno Valley.

Perris High School of the Perris high school district is the city's first public (grades 9–12) school. Established in 1887, the school was relocated in 1961, and the school's western annex on I-215 and Nuevo Road became a Continuation High School in 1993. Now, there are more high schools in the area, including Citrus Hill and Orange Vista of the Val Verde district.

Middle schools include Pinacate, Lakeside, Perris and Tomas Rivera. There are ten elementary (grades K–6) schools.

== Infrastructure ==
=== Aviation ===
The nearby, privately owned, Perris Valley Airport (FAA designator: L65) has a 5,100-foot (1,600 m) runway. Perris has drawn a crowd of skydivers, amateur and professional, to Perris Valley Skydiving. The area's sudden fame gave Perris the nickname: "the skydiving capital of America". On April 22, 1992, a de Havilland Twin Otter crashed during takeoff at Perris Valley after an engine lost power. The National Transportation Safety Board determined that the accident was caused by contaminated fuel obtained from the improper handling of the airfield's fuel tanks and the pilot's improper actions after the power loss, as well as other factors. The aircraft never rose above 50 feet and 14 parachutists and the two pilots were killed.

=== Highways ===
Perris is served by Interstate 215 which runs from Murrieta to the south to San Bernardino to the north, and by State Route 74, which serves Lake Elsinore and Orange County to the west, and the San Jacinto and Coachella valleys to the east.

=== Public safety ===
The Riverside County Sheriff's Department provides police services to the entire Perris Valley area (including the nearby communities of Mead Valley and Glen Valley, and the cities of Canyon Lake and Menifee) from its regional station on 4th Street (in the former headquarters of the now-disbanded Perris Police Department).

The city of Perris contracts for fire and paramedic services with the Riverside County Fire Department through a cooperative agreement with CAL FIRE. The CAL FIRE/Riverside County Fire Department headquarters is located in Perris.

The California State Parks have a dispatch center located in the city as well – Southern Communications Center (SURCOM). Communications Centers operate multi-frequency/channel radio systems, law enforcement telecommunications systems (CLETS), computer terminals, and associated equipment to dispatch law enforcement/emergency response units and coordinate services with field personnel and other agencies.

=== Commuter Rail ===
In June 2016, the 91/Perris Valley Line of the Metrolink commuter rail system was extended from Riverside to Perris, connecting it to downtown Los Angeles and the rest of the Greater Los Angeles megalopolis with two stations. Future expansion to Hemet has also been discussed.

=== Cemetery ===
The Perris Valley Cemetery District maintains the Perris Valley Cemetery.

== Notable people ==
- Bobbi Althoff – podcaster and social media personality
- Ricardo Breceda – visual artist
- Louis B. Mayer – Hollywood film mogul, owned a horse ranch in Perris
- Alfred E. Green – film director, born in Perris
- Danny Harris – former Olympic hurdler, silver medalist in the 1984 Los Angeles Olympic Games and the 1987 World Championships in Rome. Grew up in Perris and alumnus of Perris High School.
- Elmer Rieger – baseball player
- Abraham Placito – soccer player

== See also ==
- Perris Valley Historical and Museum Association
