= Desert Edge =

Desert Edge may refer to:

- Desert Edge, California
- Desert Edge High School, a high school in Arizona
