= Mesa Verde, California =

Mesa Verde
- census-designated place
- Position in California.
- Coordinates: 33°35′45″N 114°43′54″W
- Country: United States
- State: California
- County: Riverside

Area
  - Total: 4.301 sq mi (11.140 km^{2})
  - Land: 4.301 sq mi (11.140 km^{2})
  - Water: 0 sq mi (0 km^{2}) 0%
- Elevation: 390 ft (120 m)

Population (2020)
  - Total: 766
  - Density: 178/sq mi (68.8/km^{2})
- Time zone: UTC-8 (Pacific (PST))
  - Summer (DST): UTC-7 (PDT)
- GNIS feature ID: 2583079

Mesa Verde (Spanish for 'Green Table') is a census-designated place in Riverside County, California. Mesa Verde sits at an elevation of 390 feet (120 m). The 2020 United States census reported Mesa Verde's population was 766.

== Geography ==
According to the United States Census Bureau, the CDP covers an area of 4.3 square miles (11.1 km^{2}), all of it land.

== Demographics ==
Historical population
Census	Pop.	Note	%±
2010	1,023		—
2020	766		−25.1%
U.S. Decennial Census; 1860–1870 1880-1890; 1900 1910 1920; 1930 1940 1950; 1960 1970 1980; 1990 2000 2010

Mesa Verde first appeared as a census designated place in the 2010 U.S. census.

=== Racial and ethnic composition ===
Mesa Verde CDP, California – Racial and ethnic composition Note: the US Census treats Hispanic/Latino as an ethnic category. This table excludes Latinos from the racial categories and assigns them to a separate category. Hispanics/Latinos may be of any race.
Race / Ethnicity (NH = Non-Hispanic)	Pop 2010	Pop 2020	% 2010	% 2020
White alone (NH)	266	184	26.00%	24.02%
Black or African American alone (NH)	8	22	0.78%	2.87%
Native American or Alaska Native alone (NH)	6	1	0.59%	0.13%
Asian alone (NH)	3	4	0.29%	0.52%
Native Hawaiian or Pacific Islander alone (NH)	1	1	0.10%	0.13%
Other race alone (NH)	2	0	0.20%	0.00%
Mixed race or Multiracial (NH)	22	14	2.15%	1.83%
Hispanic or Latino (any race)	715	540	69.89%	70.50%
Total	1,023	766	100.00%	100.00%

=== 2020 census ===
The 2020 United States census reported that Mesa Verde had a population of 766. The population density was 178.1 inhabitants per square mile (68.8/km^{2}). The racial makeup of Mesa Verde was 275 (35.9%) White, 25 (3.3%) African American, 23 (3.0%) Native American, 5 (0.7%) Asian, 1 (0.1%) Pacific Islander, 300 (39.2%) from other races, and 137 (17.9%) from two or more races. Hispanic or Latino of any race were 540 persons (70.5%).

The whole population lived in households. There were 260 households, out of which 75 (28.8%) had children under the age of 18 living in them, 129 (49.6%) were married-couple households, 13 (5.0%) were cohabiting couple households, 62 (23.8%) had a female householder with no partner present, and 56 (21.5%) had a male householder with no partner present. 68 households (26.2%) were one person, and 27 (10.4%) were one person aged 65 or older. The average household size was 2.95. There were 178 families (68.5% of all households).

The age distribution was 180 people (23.5%) under the age of 18, 85 people (11.1%) aged 18 to 24, 176 people (23.0%) aged 25 to 44, 199 people (26.0%) aged 45 to 64, and 126 people (16.4%) who were 65 years of age or older. The median age was 39.6 years. For every 100 females, there were 97.4 males.

There were 313 housing units at an average density of 72.8 units per square mile (28.1 units/km^{2}), of which 260 (83.1%) were occupied. Of these, 179 (68.8%) were owner-occupied, and 81 (31.2%) were occupied by renters.
