= Garnet, California =

Garnet
- census-designated place
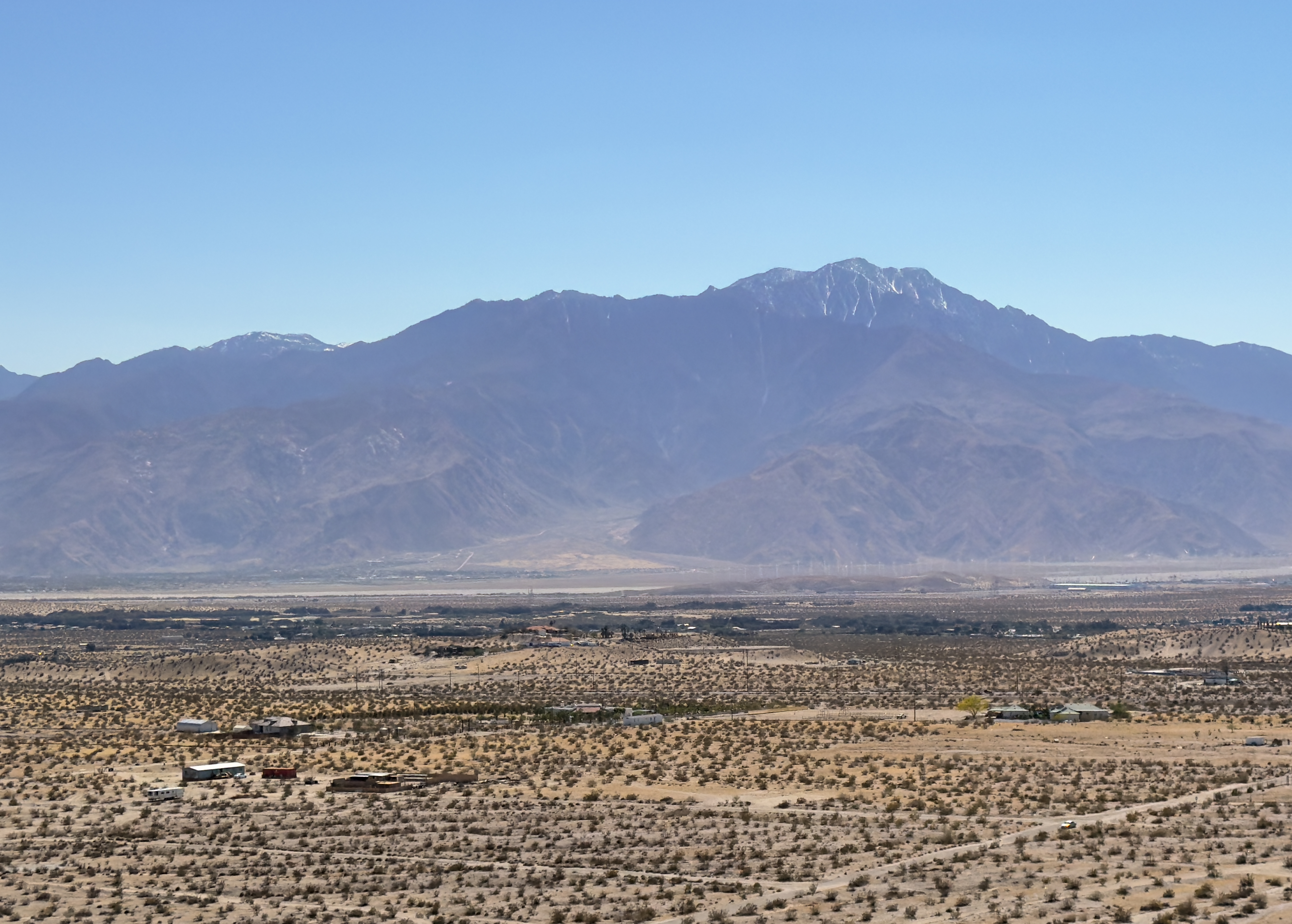
- Garnet with San Jacinto Peak in the background

- Location of Garnet in Riverside County, California

- Position in California.
- Coordinates: 33°55′08″N 116°29′23″W
- Country: United States
- State: California
- County: Riverside

Area
  - Total: 7.884 sq mi (20.420 km^{2})
  - Land: 7.884 sq mi (20.420 km^{2})
  - Water: 0 sq mi (0 km^{2}) 0%
- Elevation: 797 ft (243 m)

Population (2020)
  - Total: 7,118
  - Density: 902.8/sq mi (348.6/km^{2})
- Time zone: UTC-8 (Pacific (PST))
  - Summer (DST): UTC-7 (PDT)
- GNIS feature ID: 2629132

Garnet is a census-designated place in Riverside County, California. Garnet sits at an elevation of 797 feet (243 m). The 2020 United States census reported Garnet's population as 7,118.

== History ==
In 1875, Garnet was a railroad station for the Southern Pacific Railroad. Since then, it has had various names: Palms (original name), Seven Palms (1889), Palm Springs (1900), Pierce (1906), Gray (1917), Noria (1918), and finally Garnet (1923).

== Geography ==
According to the United States Census Bureau, the CDP covers an area of 7.9 square miles (20.4 km^{2}), all land.

== Demographics ==
Historical population
Census	Pop.	Note	%±
2010	7,543		—
2020	7,118		−5.6%
U.S. Decennial Census; 1860–1870 1880-1890; 1900 1910 1920; 1930 1940 1950; 1960 1970 1980; 1990 2000 2010

Garnet first appeared as a census designated place in the 2010 U.S. census.

=== Racial and ethnic composition ===
Garnet CDP, California – Racial and ethnic composition Note: the US Census treats Hispanic/Latino as an ethnic category. This table excludes Latinos from the racial categories and assigns them to a separate category. Hispanics/Latinos may be of any race.
Race / Ethnicity (NH = Non-Hispanic)	Pop 2010	Pop 2020	% 2010	% 2020
White alone (NH)	1,654	1,186	21.93%	16.66%
Black or African American alone (NH)	167	227	2.21%	3.19%
Native American or Alaska Native alone (NH)	30	15	0.40%	0.21%
Asian alone (NH)	53	94	0.70%	1.32%
Native Hawaiian or Pacific Islander alone (NH)	4	10	0.05%	0.14%
Other race alone (NH)	6	22	0.08%	0.31%
Mixed race or Multiracial (NH)	49	108	0.65%	1.52%
Hispanic or Latino (any race)	5,580	5,456	73.98%	76.65%
Total	7,543	7,118	100.00%	100.00%

=== 2020 census ===
As of the 2020 census, Garnet had a population of 7,118 and a population density of 902.8 inhabitants per square mile (348.6/km^{2}). The median age was 33.1 years; 29.0% of residents were under the age of 18 and 11.1% were 65 years of age or older. The age distribution was 10.4% aged 18 to 24, 26.3% aged 25 to 44, and 23.2% aged 45 to 64. For every 100 females, there were 102.8 males, and for every 100 females age 18 and over there were 98.2 males age 18 and over.

93.9% of residents lived in urban areas, while 6.1% lived in rural areas. The census reported that 99.5% of the population lived in households, 1 person (0.0%) lived in non-institutionalized group quarters, and 32 people (0.4%) were institutionalized.

There were 2,083 households in Garnet, of which 44.5% had children under the age of 18 living in them. Of all households, 51.3% were married-couple households, 9.6% were cohabiting couple households, 18.0% were households with a male householder and no spouse or partner present, and 21.2% were households with a female householder and no spouse or partner present. About 18.4% of all households were made up of individuals and 9.0% had someone living alone who was 65 years of age or older. The average household size was 3.4. There were 1,575 families (75.6% of all households).

There were 2,372 housing units at an average density of 300.9 units per square mile (116.2 units/km^{2}), of which 2,083 (87.8%) were occupied. Of these, 73.1% were owner-occupied, and 26.9% were occupied by renters. About 12.2% of housing units were vacant. The homeowner vacancy rate was 2.1% and the rental vacancy rate was 2.9%.

Racial composition as of the 2020 census
Race	Number	Percent
White	1,876	26.4%
Black or African American	251	3.5%
American Indian and Alaska Native	151	2.1%
Asian	108	1.5%
Native Hawaiian and Other Pacific Islander	14	0.2%
Some other race	3,319	46.6%
Two or more races	1,399	19.7%

=== Demographic estimates ===
In 2023, the US Census Bureau estimated that 43.0% of the population were foreign-born. Of all people aged 5 or older, 24.5% spoke only English at home, 74.0% spoke Spanish, 1.2% spoke other Indo-European languages, 0.1% spoke Asian or Pacific Islander languages, and 0.2% spoke other languages. Of those aged 25 or older, 60.5% were high school graduates and 8.8% had a bachelor's degree.

=== Income and poverty ===
The median household income was $63,082, and the per capita income was $22,985. About 14.8% of families and 16.3% of the population were below the poverty line.
