= Riverside County, California =

County in California, United States

Coordinates: 33.73°N 115.98°W

Riverside County
- County
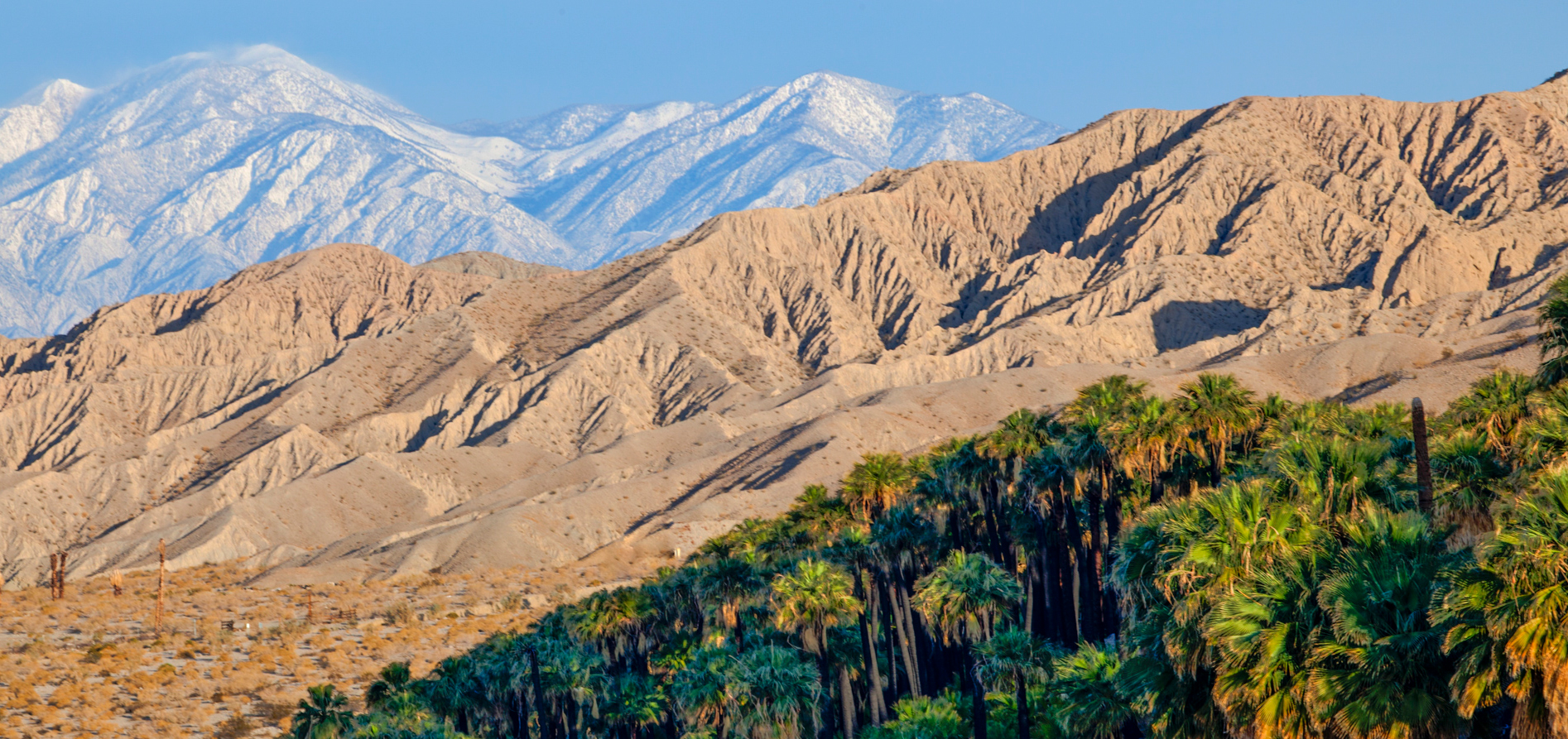
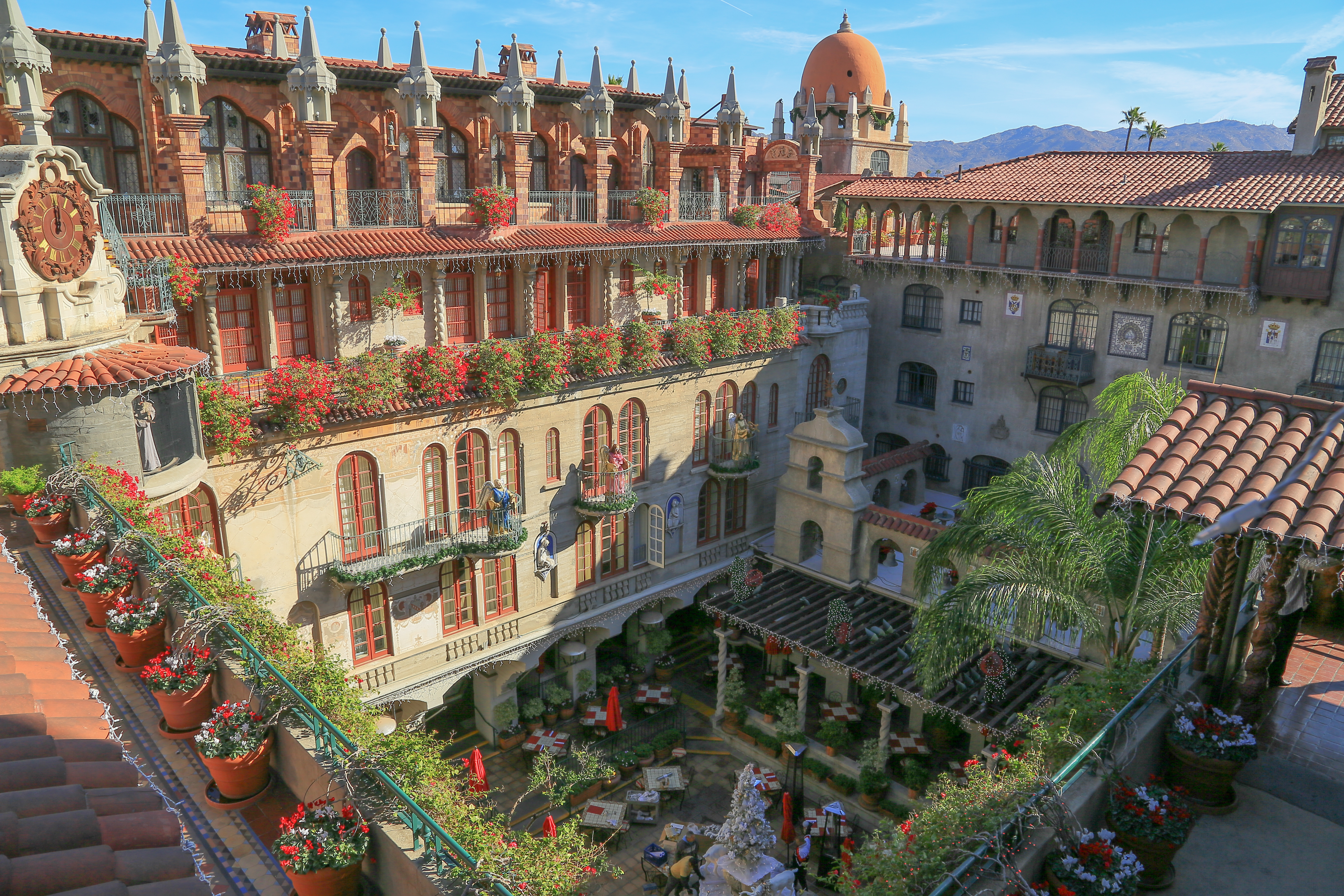
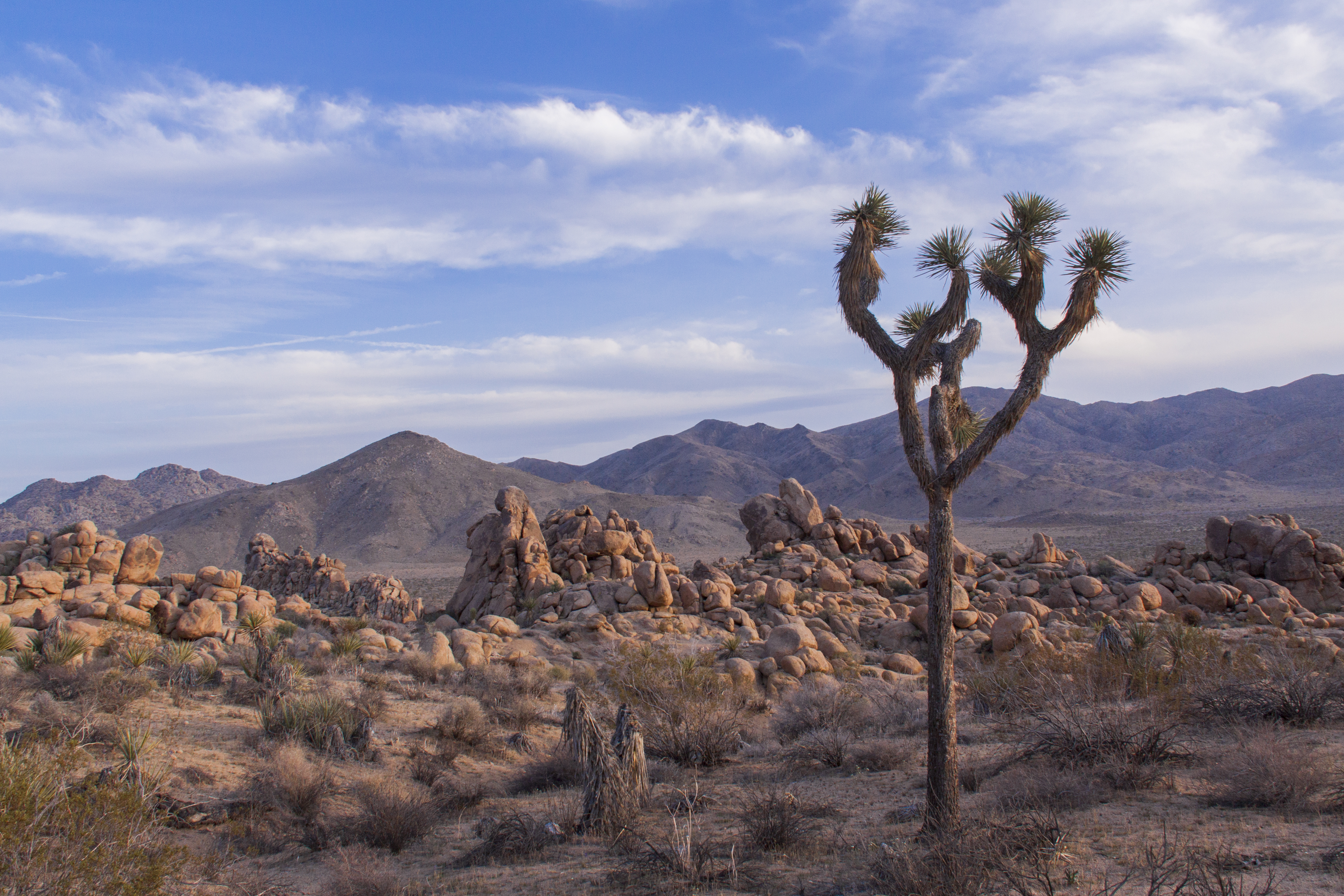
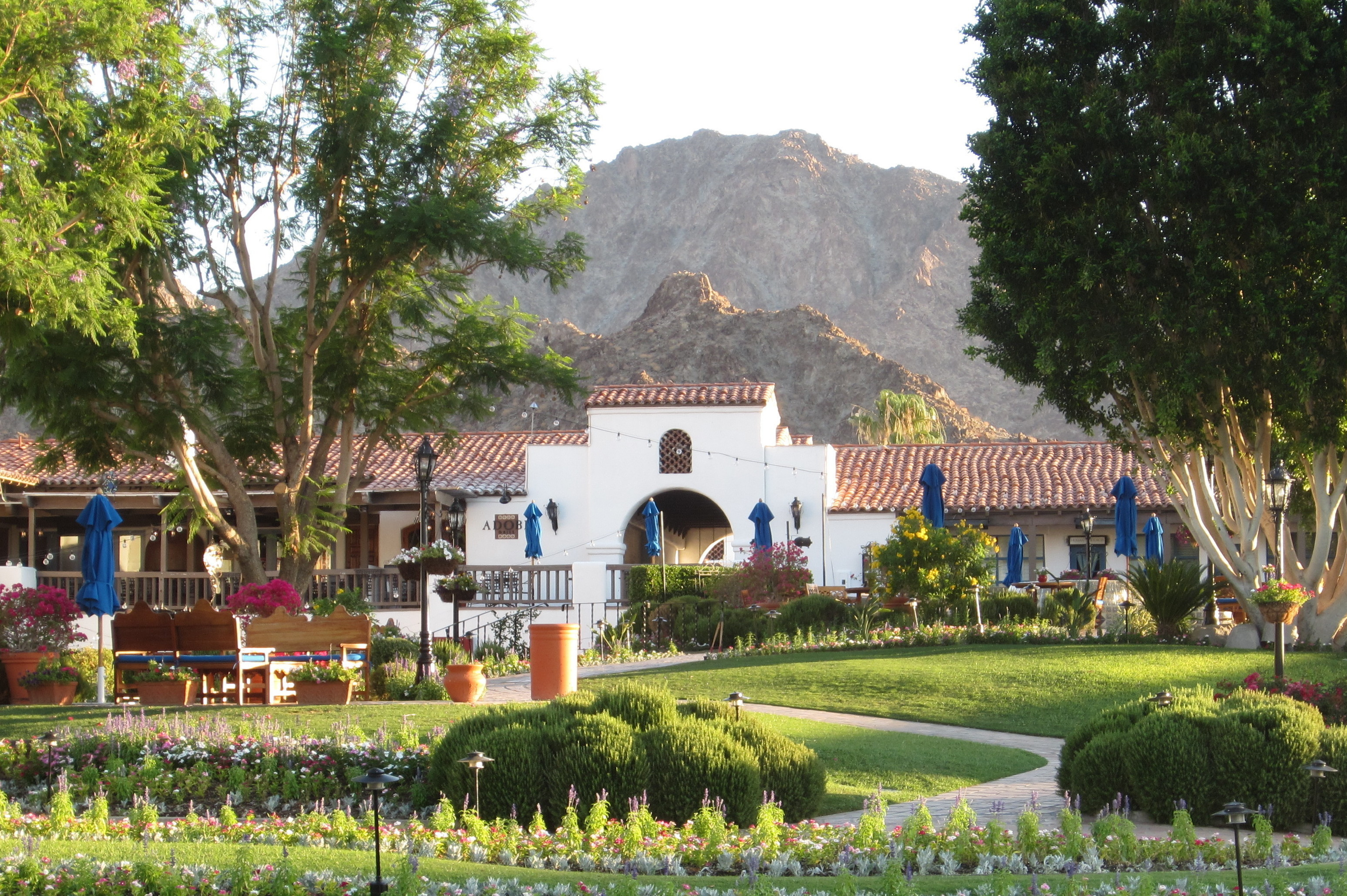
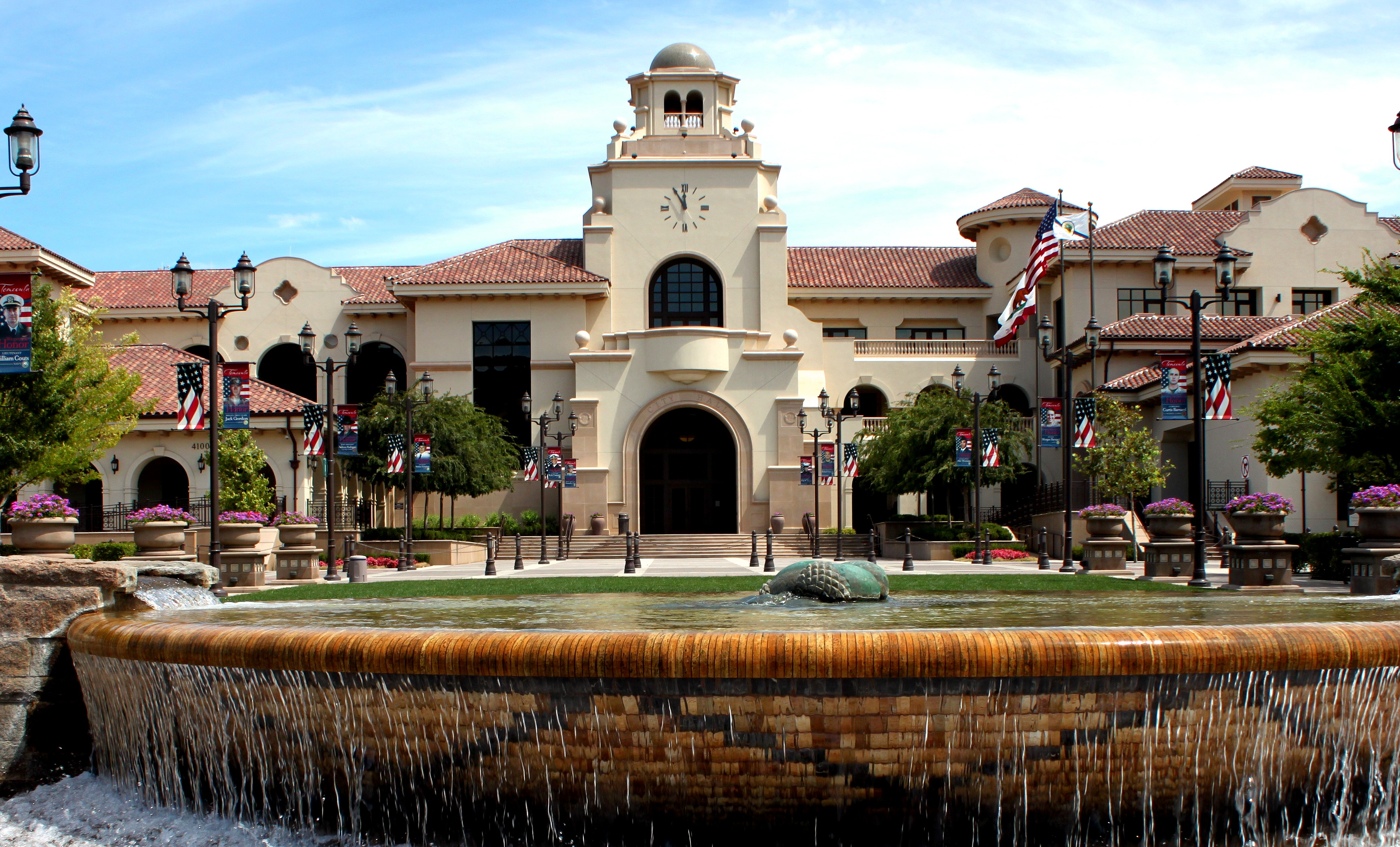
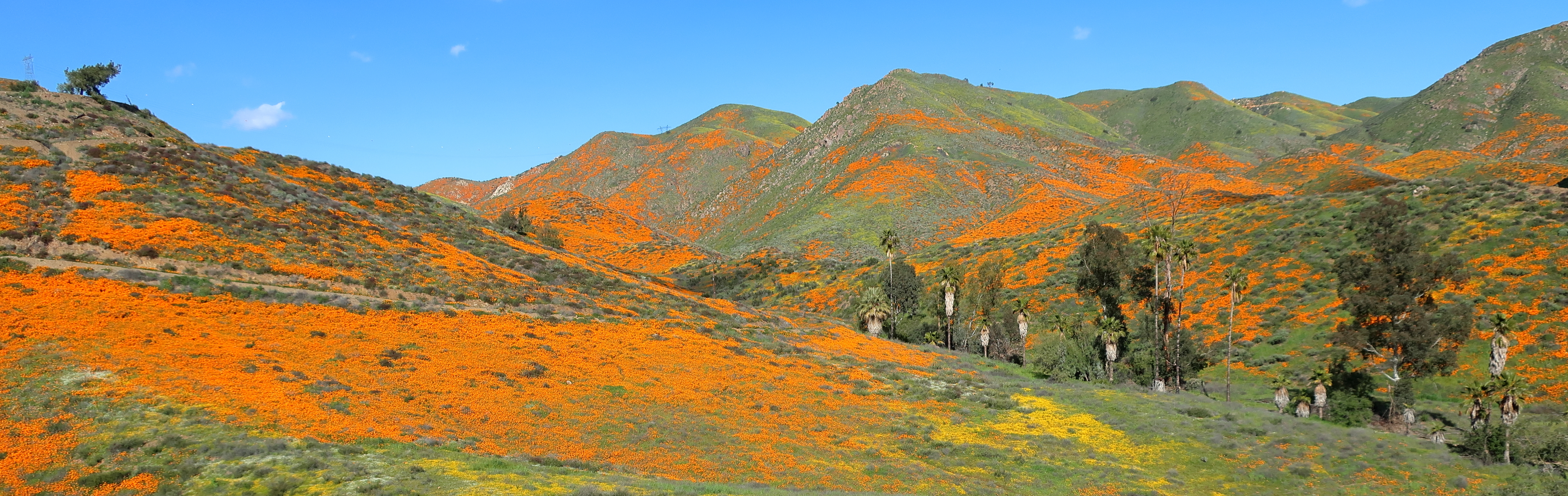
- San Bernardino Mountains and Coachella Valley Riverside Joshua Tree Palm Springs Temecula Temescal Mountains

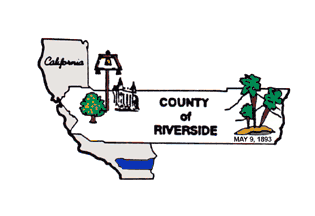
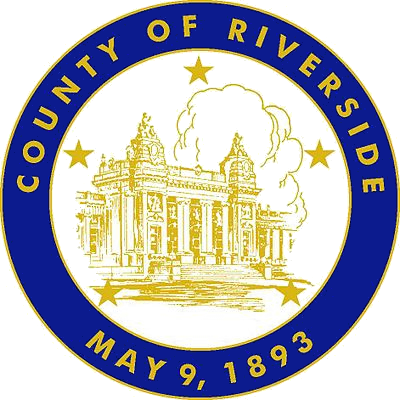
- Flag Seal
- Interactive map of Riverside County
- Location in the state of California
- Country: United States
- State: California
- Region: Inland Empire
- Incorporated: May 9, 1893
- Named for: The City of Riverside, and the city's location beside the Santa Ana River
- County seat: Riverside
- Largest city (population): Riverside
- Largest city (area): Palm Springs

Government
  - Type: Council–CEO
  - Chair: Karen Spiegel
  - Vice Chair: Yxstian Gutierrez
  - Board of Supervisors: Supervisors: Jose Medina; Karen Spiegel; Chuck Washington; V. Manuel Perez; Yxstian Gutierrez
  - Chief executive officer: Jeff Van Wagenen

Area
  - Total: 7,303 sq mi (18,910 km^{2})
  - Land: 7,207 sq mi (18,670 km^{2})
  - Water: 96 sq mi (250 km^{2}) 1.3%
- Highest elevation: 10,834 ft (3,302 m)
- Lowest elevation: −234 ft (−71 m)

Population (2020)
  - Total: 2,418,185
  - Estimate (2025): 2,544,916 ▲
  - Density: 335.5/sq mi (129.5/km^{2})

GDP
  - Total: $134.757 billion (2024)
- Time zone: UTC−8 (PST)
  - Summer (DST): UTC−7 (PDT)
- FIPS code: 06-065
- Congressional districts: 25th, 35th, 39th, 40th, 41st, 48th
- Website: rivco.gov

Riverside County is a southern county in the U.S. state of California. As of the 2020 census, its population was 2,418,185, making it the fourth-most populous county in California and the 10th-most populous county in the United States. The county seat is the city of Riverside.

Riverside County is included in the Riverside–San Bernardino–Ontario Metropolitan Statistical Area, also known as the Inland Empire included in the Greater Los Angeles Area.

Roughly rectangular, Riverside County covers 7,208 square miles (18,670 km^{2}) in Southern California, spanning from the greater Los Angeles area to the Arizona border. Geographically, the western region of the county is chaparral with a Mediterranean climate, while the central and eastern regions of the county are predominantly desert or mountainous. Most of Joshua Tree National Park is located in the county. The desert resort cities of Indio, Coachella, Palm Springs, Palm Desert, Indian Wells, La Quinta, Rancho Mirage, Cathedral City and Desert Hot Springs are located in the Coachella Valley region of central-eastern Riverside County.

Between 2007 and 2011, large numbers of Los Angeles-area workers moved to the county to take advantage of more affordable housing. Along with neighboring San Bernardino County, it was one of the fastest-growing regions in the state prior to the recent changes in the regional economy. In addition, smaller, but significant, numbers of people have been moving into southwest Riverside County from the San Diego metropolitan area.

== Location ==
Riverside County is bordered on the north by San Bernardino County; on the east by La Paz County, Arizona; on the southeast by Imperial County; on the southwest by San Diego County; and on the west by Orange County.

== Etymology ==
When Riverside County was formed in 1893, it was named for the city of Riverside, the county seat. That city, founded in 1870, was so named because of its location near the Santa Ana River.

== History ==
=== Indigenous ===
The homelands of the Cahuilla include a large area of Riverside County.

The Indigenous peoples of the valleys, mountains and deserts of what is now Riverside County are the Serrano, the Payómkawichum, the Mohave, the Cupeno, the Chemehuevi, the Cahuilla, and the Tongva. The Aguanga and Temecula Basins, Elsinore Trough and eastern Santa Ana Mountains are the traditional homelands of the Payómkawichum. The inland valleys in the Santa Rosa and San Jacinto Mountains and the desert of the Salton Sink are the traditional homelands of the Cahuilla.

=== Spanish era ===
The first European settlement in the county was a Mission San Luis Rey de Francia estancia or farm at the Luiseño village of Temescal. In 1819, the Mission granted Leandro Serrano permission to occupy the land for the purpose of grazing and farming, and Serrano established Rancho Temescal. Serrano was mayordomo of San Antonio de Pala Asistencia for the Mission of San Luis Rey.

=== Mexican era ===
With the signing of the Treaty of Cordoba in 1821, Mexico gained its independence from Spain, but the San Gabriel Mission near what is now Los Angeles, California, continued to expand, and established Rancho San Gorgonio in 1824. The ranch was to be one of the Mission's principal rancherias, and the most distant, and it occupied most of today's San Gorgonio Pass area.

Following the Mexican secularization act of 1833 by the First Mexican Republic, a series of rancho land grants were made throughout the state. In the Riverside County this included; Rancho Jurupa in 1838, El Rincon in 1839, Rancho San Jacinto Viejo in 1842, Rancho San Jacinto y San Gorgonio in 1843, Ranchos La Laguna, Pauba, Temecula in 1844, Ranchos Little Temecula, Potreros de San Juan Capistrano in 1845, Ranchos San Jacinto Sobrante, La Sierra (Sepulveda), La Sierra (Yorba), Santa Rosa and San Jacinto Nuevo y Potrero in 1846.

New Mexican colonists founded the town of La Placita on the east side of the Santa Ana River at the northern extremity of what is now the city of Riverside in 1843.

=== American era ===
When the initial 27 California counties were established in 1850, the area today known as Riverside County was partially in Los Angeles County and partially in San Diego County. In 1853, the eastern part of Los Angeles County was used to create San Bernardino County. Between 1891 and 1893, several proposals and legislative attempts were put forth to form new counties in Southern California. These proposals included one for a Pomona County and one for a San Jacinto County. None of the proposals were adopted until a measure to create Riverside County was signed by Governor Henry H. Markham on March 11, 1893.

==== County formation ====
The new county was created from parts of San Bernardino County and San Diego County. On May 2, 1893, seventy percent of voters approved the formation of Riverside County. Voters chose the city of Riverside as the county seat, also by a large margin. Riverside County was officially formed on May 9, 1893, when the Board of Commissioners filed the final canvass of the votes.

==== 20th and 21st centuries ====
Riverside County was a major focal point of the US Civil Rights Movement of the 1950s and 1960s, especially the African-American sections of Riverside and heavily Mexican-American communities of the Coachella Valley visited by Cesar Chavez of the farm labor union struggle.

Riverside County has also been a focus of modern Native American Gaming enterprises. In the early 1980s, the county government attempted to shut down small bingo halls operated by the Morongo Band of Cahuilla Mission Indians and the Cabazon Band of Mission Indians. The tribes joined forces and fought the county all the way to the U.S. Supreme Court, which ruled in the tribes' favor on February 25, 1987. In turn, Congress enacted the Indian Gaming Regulatory Act in 1988 to establish a legal framework for the relationship between Indian gaming and state governments. Naturally, both tribes now operate large casinos in the county: the Morongo Casino, Resort & Spa and the Fantasy Springs Resort Casino adjacent to Spotlight 29 Casino.

== Geography ==
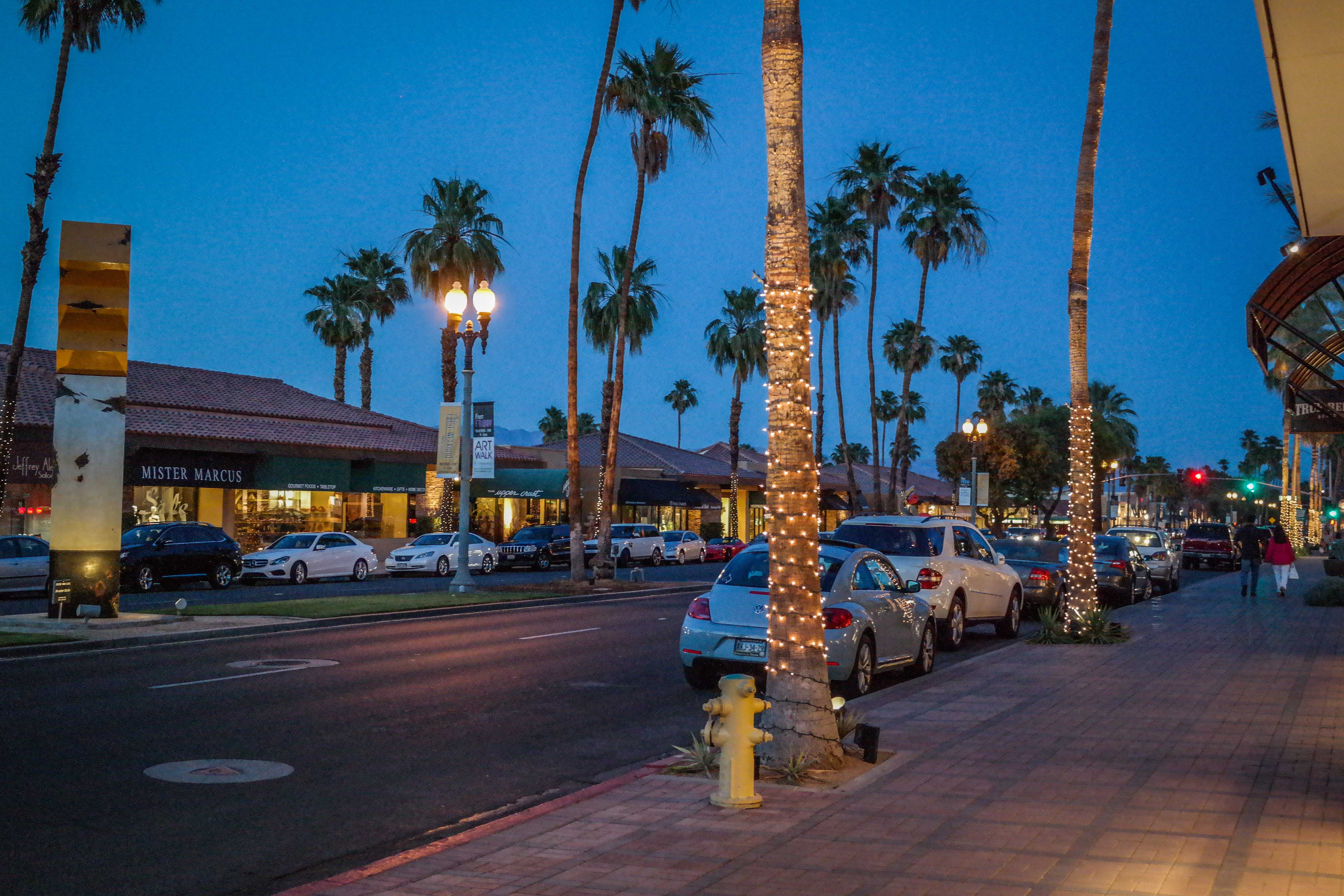
El Paseo in Palm Desert, California

According to the U.S. Census Bureau, the county has a total area of 7,303 square miles (18,910 km^{2}), of which 7,206 square miles (18,660 km^{2}) is land and 97 square miles (250 km^{2}) (1.3%) is water. It is the fourth-largest county in California by area. At roughly 180 miles (290 km) wide in the east–west dimension, the area of the county is massive. Riverside County, California is roughly the size of the State of New Jersey in total area. County government documents frequently cite the Colorado River town of Blythe as being a "three-hour drive" from the county seat, Riverside. Some view the areas west of San Gorgonio Pass as the Inland Empire portion of the county and the eastern part as either the Mojave Desert or Colorado Desert portion. There are probably at least three geomorphic provinces: the Inland Empire western portion, the Santa Rosa Mountains communities such as Reinhardt Canyon, and the desert region. Other possible subdivisions include tribal lands, the Colorado River communities, and the Salton Sea.

=== Flora and fauna ===
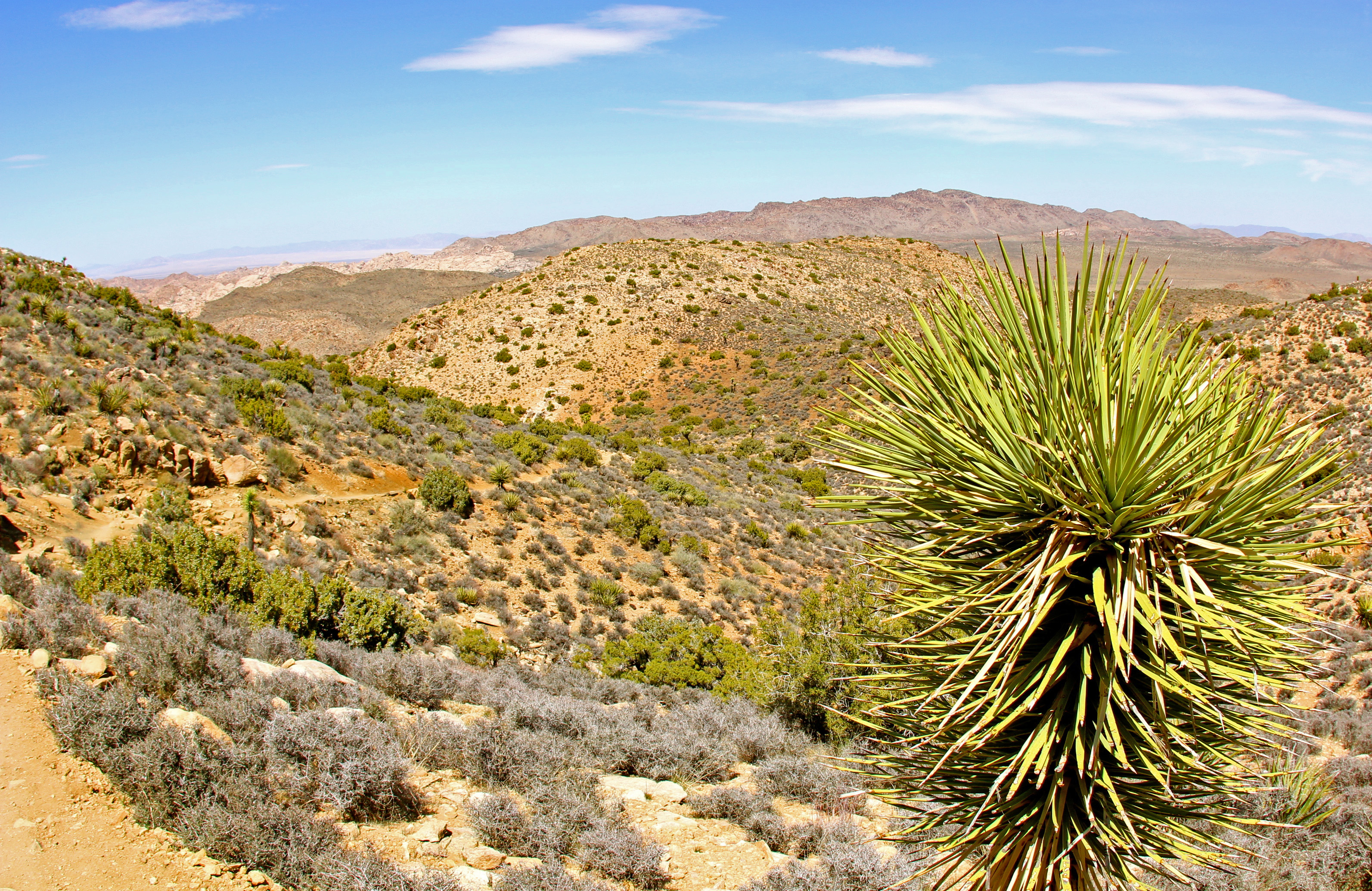
Yucca pines near Ryan Mountain Trail in Joshua Tree National Park

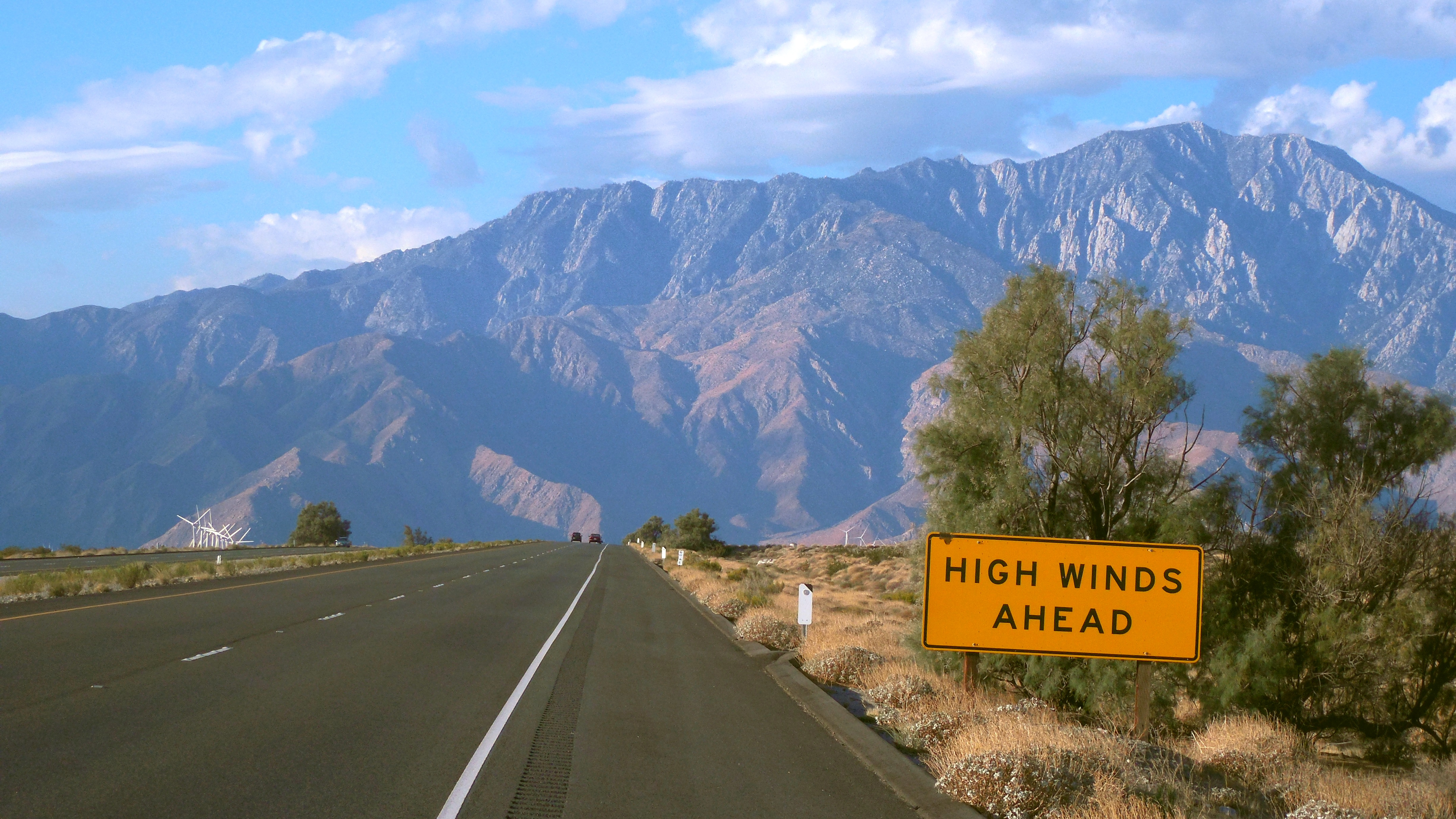
Southerly view of the San Jacinto Mountains from State Route 62

There is a diversity of flora and fauna within Riverside County. Vegetative plant associations feature many desert flora, but there are also forested areas within the county. The California endemic Blue oak, Quercus douglasii is at the southernmost part of its range in Riverside County.

=== National protected areas ===
- Cleveland National Forest (part)
- Coachella Valley National Wildlife Refuge
- Dos Palmas Preserve
- Joshua Tree National Park (part)
- San Bernardino National Forest (part)
- Sand to Snow National Monument (part)
- Santa Rosa and San Jacinto Mountains National Monument

There are 19 official wilderness areas in Riverside County that are part of the National Wilderness Preservation System. Some are integral parts of the above protected areas, most (11 of the 19) are managed solely by the Bureau of Land Management, and some share management between the BLM and the relevant other agencies. Some extend into neighboring counties:

- Agua Tibia Wilderness (part)
- Beauty Mountain Wilderness
- Big Maria Mountains Wilderness
- Cahuilla Mountain Wilderness
- Chuckwalla Mountains Wilderness
- Joshua Tree Wilderness (part)
- Little Chuckwalla Mountains Wilderness (part)
- Mecca Hills Wilderness
- Orocopia Mountains Wilderness
- Palen/McCoy Wilderness
- Palo Verde Mountains Wilderness (part)
- Pinto Mountains Wilderness
- Rice Valley Wilderness
- Riverside Mountains Wilderness
- San Gorgonio Wilderness (part)
- San Jacinto Wilderness
- San Mateo Canyon Wilderness (part)
- Santa Rosa Wilderness
- South Fork San Jacinto Wilderness

=== State parks ===
- California Citrus State Historic Park
- Lake Perris State Recreation Area
- Mount San Jacinto State Park

=== County parks and trails ===
- Hurkey Creek Park
- Idyllwild Park
- Indio Hills Palms
- Jensen Alvarado Ranch
- Lake Cahuilla Recreation Area
- Lake Skinner Recreation Area
- McCall Memorial Equestrian Park
- Santa Rosa Plateau

== Demographics ==
Historical population
Census	Pop.	Note	%±
1900	17,897		—
1910	34,696		93.9%
1920	50,297		45.0%
1930	81,024		61.1%
1940	105,524		30.2%
1950	170,046		61.1%
1960	306,191		80.1%
1970	459,074		49.9%
1980	663,166		44.5%
1990	1,170,413		76.5%
2000	1,545,387		32.0%
2010	2,189,641		41.7%
2020	2,418,185		10.4%
2025 (est.)	2,544,916	▲	5.2%
U.S. Decennial Census; 1790–1960

=== 2020 census ===
As of the 2020 census, the county had a population of 2,418,185. The median age was 36.8 years, with 24.6% of residents under the age of 18 and 15.3% 65 years of age or older. For every 100 females there were 98.4 males, and for every 100 females age 18 and over there were 96.4 males.

The racial makeup of the county was 41.2% White, 6.5% Black or African American, 1.8% American Indian and Alaska Native, 7.1% Asian, 0.3% Native Hawaiian and Pacific Islander, 26.4% from some other race, and 16.8% from two or more races. Hispanic or Latino residents of any race comprised 49.7% of the population.

94.5% of residents lived in urban areas, while 5.5% lived in rural areas.

There were 763,283 households in the county, of which 38.4% had children under the age of 18 living with them and 24.4% had a female householder with no spouse or partner present. About 19.4% of all households were made up of individuals and 10.0% had someone living alone who was 65 years of age or older.

There were 848,549 housing units, of which 10.0% were vacant. Among occupied housing units, 66.6% were owner-occupied and 33.4% were renter-occupied. The homeowner vacancy rate was 1.5% and the rental vacancy rate was 5.4%.

=== Racial and ethnic composition ===
Riverside County, California – Racial and ethnic composition Note: the US Census treats Hispanic/Latino as an ethnic category. This table excludes Latinos from the racial categories and assigns them to a separate category. Hispanics/Latinos may be of any race.
Race / Ethnicity (NH = Non-Hispanic)	Pop 1980	Pop 1990	Pop 2000	Pop 2010	Pop 2020	% 1980	% 1990	% 2000	% 2010	% 2020
White alone (NH)	490,144	754,140	788,831	869,068	788,235	73.91%	64.43%	51.04%	39.69%	32.60%
Black or African American alone (NH)	30,088	59,966	92,403	130,823	146,762	4.54%	5.12%	5.98%	5.97%	6.07%
Native American or Alaska Native alone (NH)	7,204	8,393	10,135	10,931	11,960	1.09%	0.72%	0.66%	0.50%	0.49%
Asian alone (NH)	9,210	38,349	55,199	125,921	164,889	1.39%	3.28%	3.57%	5.75%	6.82%
Native Hawaiian or Pacific Islander alone (NH)	x	x	3,284	5,849	6,767	0.21%	0.27%	0.21%	0.27%	0.28%
Other race alone (NH)	2,103	2,051	2,425	3,682	12,365	0.32%	0.18%	0.16%	0.17%	0.51%
Mixed race or Multiracial (NH)	x	x	33,535	48,110	84,912	x	x	2.17%	2.20%	3.51%
Hispanic or Latino (any race)	124,417	307,514	559,575	995,257	1,202,295	18.76%	26.27%	36.21%	45.45%	49.72%
Total	663,166	1,170,413	1,545,387	2,189,641	2,418,185	100.00%	100.00%	100.00%	100.00%	100.00%

=== American Community Survey 2025 data ===
The United States Census Bureau estimated that in 2025, Riverside County’s population was 2.544.916. It was also estimated that the county's population was 29,20% Non-Hispanic White, 52,99% Hispanic or Latino, 6,14% Non-Hispanic Black, 7,73% Asian, 0,47% Native American, 0,30% Pacific Islander, and 3,16% Multiracial.

Total	Population	Percentage
Non-Hispanic White	743.162	29,20%
Hispanic or Latino	1.348.478	52,99%
Non-Hispanic Black	156.288	6,14%
Asian	196.738	7,73%
Native American	12.035	0,47%
Pacific Islander	7.738	0,30%
Non-Hispanic Multiracial	80.477	3,16%

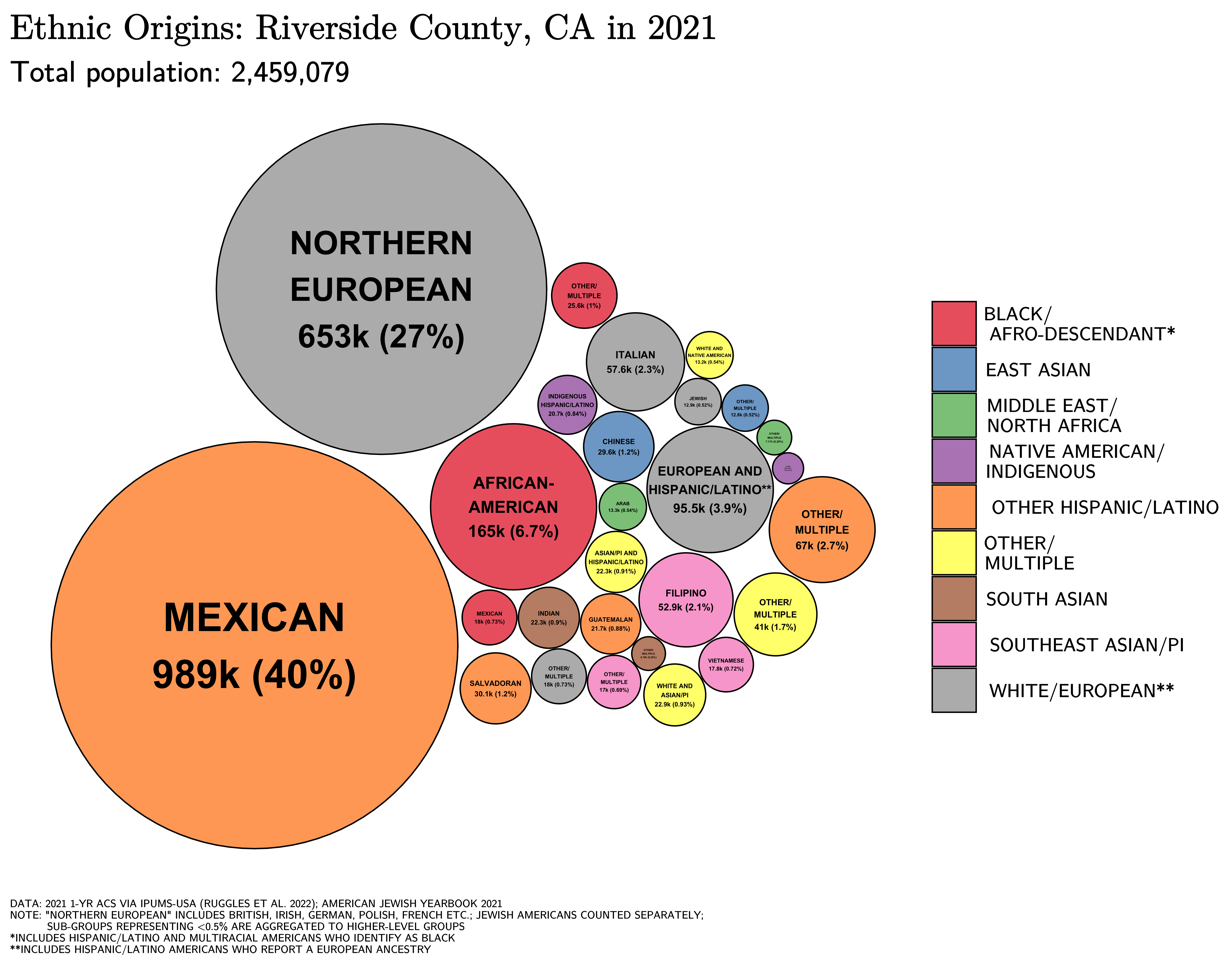
Ethnic origins in Riverside County

=== 2010 census ===
The 2010 United States census reported that Riverside County had a population of 2,189,641. The racial makeup of Riverside County was 1,335,147 (61.0%) White (40.7% Non-Hispanic White), 140,543 (6.4%) African American, 23,710 (1.1%) Native American, 130,468 (6.0%) Asian (2.3% Filipino, 0.8% Chinese, 0.7% Vietnamese, 0.6% Korean, 0.5% Indian, 0.2% Japanese, 0.1% Cambodian, 0.1% Laotian, 0.1% Pakistani), 6,874 (0.3%) Pacific Islander, 448,235 (20.5%) from other races, and 104,664 (4.8%) from two or more races. There were 995,257 residents of Hispanic or Latino ancestry, of any race (45.5%); 39.5% of Riverside County was of Mexican origin, 0.8% Salvadoran, 0.7% Honduran, 0.6% Puerto Rican, 0.3% Cuban, and 0.2% Nicaraguan descent.

Population reported at 2010 United States census
The County	Total; Population	White	African; American	Native; American	Asian	Pacific; Islander	other races	two or more races	Hispanic or Latino (of any race)
Riverside County	2,189,641	1,335,147	140,543	23,710	130,468	6,874	448,235	104,664	995,257
Incorporated cities	Total; Population	White	African; American	Native; American	Asian	Pacific; Islander	other races	two or more races	Hispanic or Latino (of any race)
Banning	29,603	19,164	2,165	641	1,549	39	4,604	1,441	12,181
Beaumont	36,877	23,163	2,276	544	2,845	83	6,058	1,908	14,864
Blythe	20,817	12,396	3,126	243	319	32	4,045	656	11,068
Calimesa	7,879	6,777	88	99	100	10	565	240	1,762
Canyon Lake	10,561	9,495	128	61	190	36	316	335	1,303
Cathedral City	51,200	32,537	1,344	540	2,562	55	12,008	2,154	30,085
Coachella	40,704	19,576	320	290	266	34	19,154	1,064	39,254
Corona	152,374	90,925	8,934	1,153	15,048	552	28,003	7,759	66,447
Desert Hot Springs	25,938	15,053	2,133	357	675	84	6,343	1,293	13,646
Eastvale	53,668	22,998	5,190	290	13,003	198	9,172	2,817	21,445
Hemet	78,657	53,259	5,049	1,223	2,352	284	12,371	4,119	28,150
Indian Wells	4,958	4,721	29	20	83	2	52	51	209
Indio	76,036	46,735	1,805	741	1,693	55	22,394	2,613	51,540
La Quinta	37,467	29,489	713	230	1,176	41	4,595	1,223	11,339
Lake Elsinore	51,821	31,067	2,738	483	2,996	174	11,174	3,189	25,073
Menifee	77,519	55,444	3,858	655	3,788	295	9,642	3,837	25,551
Moreno Valley	193,365	80,969	34,889	1,721	11,867	1,117	51,741	11,061	105,169
Murrieta	103,466	72,137	5,601	741	9,556	391	8,695	6,345	26,792
Norco	27,063	20,641	1,893	248	844	59	2,514	864	8,405
Palm Desert	48,445	39,957	875	249	1,647	55	4,427	1,235	11,038
Palm Springs	44,552	33,720	1,982	467	1,971	71	4,949	1,392	11,286
Perris	68,386	28,937	8,307	589	2,461	286	24,345	3,461	49,079
Rancho Mirage	17,218	15,267	256	94	651	14	598	338	1,964
Riverside	303,871	171,669	21,421	3,467	22,566	1,219	68,111	15,418	148,953
San Jacinto	44,199	25,272	2,928	812	1,341	124	11,208	2,514	23,109
Temecula	100,097	70,880	4,132	1,079	9,765	368	7,928	5,945	24,727
Wildomar	32,176	22,372	1,065	376	1,454	69	5,124	1,716	11,363
Census-designated places	Total; Population	White	African; American	Native; American	Asian	Pacific; Islander	other races	two or more races	Hispanic or Latino (of any race)
Aguanga	1,128	929	11	20	24	0	109	35	274
Anza	3,014	2,411	34	57	36	3	347	126	791
Bermuda Dunes	7,282	5,433	180	63	241	11	1,126	228	2,371
Cabazon	2,535	1,751	135	90	38	14	358	149	1,135
Cherry Valley	6,362	5,450	63	102	87	4	451	205	1,347
Coronita	2,608	1,649	38	31	108	12	688	82	1,349
Crestmore Heights	384	229	2	2	6	0	133	12	263
Desert Center	204	164	1	3	2	0	25	9	38
Desert Edge	3,822	3,051	14	34	28	1	624	70	1,220
Desert Palms	6,957	6,728	59	16	95	5	15	39	177
East Hemet	17,418	12,257	679	323	275	29	2,997	858	6,778
El Cerrito	5,100	3,542	91	54	95	11	1,122	185	2,657
El Sobrante	12,723	7,435	1,010	73	2,240	36	1,312	617	3,626
French Valley	23,067	14,827	1,828	229	2,672	134	1,889	1,488	6,318
Garnet	7,543	4,247	203	96	62	10	2,636	289	5,580
Glen Avon	20,199	10,272	805	216	462	34	7,567	843	13,766
Good Hope	9,192	4,156	669	98	64	4	3,885	316	7,319
Green Acres	1,805	1,192	34	41	25	2	396	115	856
Highgrove	3,988	2,104	162	41	113	13	1,388	167	2,604
Home Gardens	11,570	5,275	364	126	667	51	4,500	587	8,524
Homeland	5,969	3,727	130	85	49	15	1,673	290	3,110
Idyllwild-Pine Cove	3,874	3,434	32	30	135	6	88	149	479
Indio Hills	972	542	6	15	5	1	391	12	657
Lake Mathews	5,890	4,239	253	59	193	3	891	252	1,808
Lake Riverside	1,173	1,042	21	16	2	8	46	38	186
Lakeland Village	11,541	7,764	285	131	168	21	2,575	597	5,114
Lakeview	2,104	1,117	15	48	7	2	842	73	1,350
March ARB	1,159	811	171	10	35	2	93	37	172
Mead Valley	18,510	8,383	1,515	179	259	17	7,484	673	13,395
Meadowbrook	3,185	2,034	130	19	51	4	798	149	1,765
Mecca	8,577	2,686	40	47	17	7	5,543	237	8,462
Mesa Verde	1,023	589	8	9	4	1	373	39	715
Mira Loma	21,930	12,577	383	240	465	43	7,250	972	14,846
Mountain Center	63	60	0	1	1	0	0	1	15
North Shore	3,477	1,394	33	26	18	5	1,884	117	3,313
Nuevo	6,447	4,011	113	91	82	16	1,810	324	3,514
Oasis	6,890	1,693	22	96	42	0	4,927	110	6,731
Pedley	12,672	7,509	381	119	554	48	3,520	541	6,773
Ripley	692	393	103	2	1	4	165	24	537
Romoland	1,684	958	65	8	35	12	514	92	865
Rubidoux	34,280	16,935	1,850	391	855	136	12,469	1,644	23,322
Sky Valley	2,406	1,961	35	34	21	3	282	70	682
Sunnyslope	5,153	3,017	96	55	76	10	1,696	203	3,630
Temescal Valley	22,535	14,785	1,507	131	2,157	74	2,565	1,316	6,753
Thermal	2,865	1,034	28	30	32	1	1,685	55	2,730
Thousand Palms	7,715	5,763	105	75	129	10	1,422	211	4,051
Valle Vista	14,578	11,542	440	252	283	41	1,351	669	4,027
Vista Santa Rosa	2,926	1,699	8	140	6	0	942	131	2,487
Warm Springs	2,676	1,673	119	24	102	14	606	138	1,232
Whitewater	859	636	37	31	21	0	97	37	267
Winchester	2,534	1,577	38	17	46	2	728	126	1,233
Woodcrest	14,347	10,418	716	69	715	41	1,716	672	4,113
Other unincorporated areas	Total; Population	White	African; American	Native; American	Asian	Pacific; Islander	other races	two or more races	Hispanic or Latino (of any race)
All others not CDPs (combined)	73,117	51,422	2,231	2,102	3,794	206	10,105	3,257	24,128

=== 2000 census ===
As of the census of 2000, there were 1,545,387 people, 506,218 households, and 372,576 families residing in the county. The population density was 214 inhabitants per square mile (83/km^{2}). There were 584,674 housing units at an average density of 81 per square mile (31/km^{2}). The racial makeup of the county was 65.6% White, 6.2% Black or African American, 1.2% Native American, 3.7% Asian, 0.3% Pacific Islander, 18.7% from other races, and 4.4% from two or more races. 36.2% of the population were Hispanic or Latino of any race. 9.2% were of German, 6.9% English, 6.1% Irish and 5.0% American ancestry according to Census 2000. 67.2% spoke English and 27.7% Spanish as their first language.

In 2006 the county had a population of 2,026,803, up 31.2% since 2000. In 2005 45.8% of the population was non-Hispanic whites. The percentages of African Americans, Asians and Native Americans remained relatively similar to their 2000 figures. The percentage of Pacific Islanders had majorly risen to 0.4. Hispanics now constituted 41% of the population.

There were 506,218 households, out of which 38.90% had children under the age of 18 living with them, 56.5% were married couples living together, 12.0% had a female householder with no husband present, and 26.4% were non-families. 20.7% of all households were made up of individuals, and 9.3% had someone living alone who was 65 years of age or older. The average household size was 3.0 and the average family size was 3.5.

In the county, the population was spread out, with 30.3% under the age of 18, 9.2% from 18 to 24, 28.9% from 25 to 44, 18.9% from 45 to 64, and 12.7% who were 65 years of age or older. The median age was 33 years. For every 100 females, there were 99.1 males. For every 100 females age 18 and over, there were 96.8 males.

The median income for a household in the county was $42,887, and the median income for a family was $48,409. Males had a median income of $38,639 versus $28,032 for females. The per capita income for the county was $18,689. About 10.7% of families and 14.2% of the population were below the poverty line, including 18.5% of those under age 18 and 7.6% of those age 65 or over.

== Government and law enforcement ==
=== Government ===
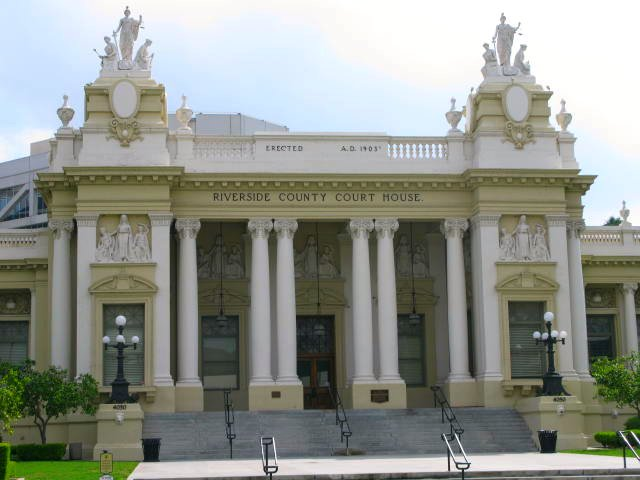
Riverside County Historic Courthouse

The Government of Riverside County operates as a general law county under the California Constitution and law. It does not have a county charter. The county government provides countywide services such as elections and voter registration, law enforcement, jails, vital records, property records, tax collection, public health, and social services. In addition the County serves as the local government for all unincorporated areas.

The county is governed by a five-member Board of Supervisors, with each member elected by districts for four-year terms. In 1999, the Board of Supervisors approved a multimillion-dollar planning effort to create the Riverside County Integrated Plan (RCIP) which was to encompass a completely new General Plan, regional transportation plan (CETAP) and Habitat Conservation Plan. The resultant General Plan adopted in 2003 was considered groundbreaking for its multidisciplinary approach to land use and conservation planning.

=== Board of Supervisors ===
District	Supervisor	Cities & Areas Represented	Party (officially nonpartisan)
1	Jose Medina	Riverside, Perris, and portions of Jurupa Valley, along with the unincorporated communities of Good Hope, Highgrove, March Air Reserve Base, Mead Valley, and Meadowbrook	Democratic
2	Karen Spiegal	Canyon Lake, Corona, Eastvale, Jurupa Valley, Lake Elsinore, and Norco, along with the unincorporated areas of Coronita, El Cerrito, Gavilan Hills, Home Gardens, Lake Mathews, Lakeland Village, Temescal Valley, Warm Springs, Woodcrest.	Republican
3	Chuck Washington	Menifee, Murrieta, Temecula, and Wildoma, along with the unincorporated communities of Aguanga, Anza Valley, De Luz, East Hemet, French Valley, Green Acres, Homeland, La Cresta, Lake Riverside, Romoland, Sage, Tenaja, Winchester and Valle Vista.	Democratic
4	V. Manuel Perez	Blythe, Cathedral City, Coachella, Desert Hot Springs, Indian Wells, Indio, La Quinta, Palm Desert, Palm Springs and Rancho Mirage, along with the unincorporated communities of Bermuda Dunes, Chiriaco Summit, Colorado River Communities, Desert Center/Lake Tamarisk/Eagle Mountain, Desert Edge, Desert Palms, Indio Hills, Mecca, Mesa Verde, North Shore, Oasis, Ripley, Sky Valley, Thermal, Thousand Palms, Vista Santa Rosa, and the Idyllwild/Mountain Communities.	Democratic
5	Yxstian Gutierrez	Banning, Beaumont, Calimesa, Hemet, Moreno Valley and San Jacinto, along with the unincorporated communities of Cabazon, Cherry Valley, Lakeview, Nuevo, Reche Canyon, San Timeteo Canyon, as well as parts of Valle Vista.	Democratic

=== Courts ===
The Riverside Superior Court is the state trial court for Riverside County with 14 courthouses: Riverside Historic Courthouse, Riverside Hall of Justice, Riverside Family Law Court, Riverside Juvenile Court, Southwest Justice Center – Murrieta, Moreno Valley Court, Banning Court, Hemet Court, Corona Court, Temecula Court, Larson Justice Center – Indio, Indio Juvenile Court, Palm Springs Court and Blythe Court.

The main courthouse is the Riverside Historic Courthouse. This landmark, erected in 1903, was modeled after the Grand and Petit Palais in Paris, France. The courthouse, designed by Los Angeles architects Burnham and Bliesner, has a classical design – including a great hall that connects all the departments (courtrooms). In 1994, the courthouse was closed for seismic retrofits due to the 1992 Landers and 1994 Northridge earthquakes. The courthouse was reopened and rededicated in September 1998.

Riverside County hands down 1 in 6 death sentences in the US, in spite of it having less than 1% of the population.

== Politics ==
=== Voter registration ===
Population and registered voters
Eligible voters	2,473,902	
Registered voters (Note: Percentage of registered voters with respect to total population. Percentages of party members with respect to registered voters follow.)	1,372,548	83.34%
Democratic	539,624	39.32%
Republican	447,217	32.58%
Democratic–Republican spread	+92,407	6.74%
American Independent	63,621	4.64%
Green	5,329	0.39%
Libertarian	15,541	1.13%
Peace and Freedom	9,261	0.67%
Unknown	2,807	0.20%
Other	14,599	1.06%
No party preference	274,549	20.00%

Cities by population and voter registration
City	Population	Registered voters	Democratic	Republican	D–R spread	Other	No party preference
Banning	29,414	42.9%	38.9%	40.8%	-1.9%	8.2%	15.4%
Beaumont	34,737	46.4%	33.6%	40.8%	-7.2%	10.3%	19.4%
Blythe	21,102	23.1%	40.3%	36.0%	+4.3%	9.2%	18.3%
Calimesa	7,923	53.7%	29.0%	48.8%	-19.8%	10.1%	16.2%
Canyon Lake	10,663	57.3%	19.9%	57.5%	-37.6%	9.7%	16.8%
Cathedral City	51,130	37.6%	46.9%	31.8%	+15.1%	6.2%	17.5%
Coachella	39,442	25.0%	72.1%	13.1%	+59.0%	2.9%	12.8%
Corona	158,391	43.0%	32.9%	43.3%	-10.4%	7.2%	19.2%
Desert Hot Springs	25,793	35.5%	44.0%	32.7%	+11.3%	8.3%	18.0%
Eastvale	53,437	40.6%	38.0%	34.2%	+3.8%	6.9%	23.6%
Hemet	77,752	44.8%	34.0%	42.4%	-8.4%	9.3%	18.1%
Indian Wells	4,937	59.8%	19.0%	62.7%	-43.7%	6.5%	14.4%
Indio	74,402	39.7%	47.9%	33.0%	+14.9%	6.0%	15.4%
Jurupa Valley (Note: Population for this city obtained by summing the populations of Glen Avon, Mira Loma, Pedley, Rubidoux and Sunnyslope; see Jurupa Valley)	57,464	58.4%	40.1%	37.1%	+3.0%	7.1%	18.3%
La Quinta	36,600	52.8%	30.6%	47.4%	-16.8%	8.1%	17.2%
Lake Elsinore	50,405	38.1%	33.8%	36.8%	-3.0%	9.7%	23.4%
Menifee	75,023	52.0%	31.1%	44.2%	-13.1%	9.6%	19.0%
Moreno Valley	190,977	43.5%	48.1%	33.5%	+14.6%	5.6%	14.8%
Murrieta	99,476	48.8%	25.3%	48.2%	-22.9%	9.2%	20.8%
Norco	27,131	45.0%	25.2%	52.5%	-27.3%	8.2%	17.2%
Palm Desert	48,769	50.7%	31.5%	45.8%	-14.3%	7.6%	18.1%
Palm Springs	45,045	53.7%	50.9%	26.7%	+24.2%	7.3%	17.9%
Perris	65,993	36.3%	54.2%	27.8%	+26.4%	5.1%	14.6%
Rancho Mirage	17,022	58.8%	33.2%	45.3%	-12.1%	5.8%	18.0%
Riverside	303,569	44.0%	38.5%	39.0%	-0.5%	7.5%	17.6%
San Jacinto	42,722	38.0%	36.5%	38.6%	-2.1%	9.3%	19.1%
Temecula	98,189	48.0%	25.2%	47.6%	-22.4%	9.7%	21.4%
Wildomar	31,452	47.4%	26.8%	45.4%	-18.6%	10.3%	21.4%

Chart of voter registration
1. Democratic (40.5%)
2. Republican (31.3%)
3. Independent (20.5%)
4. Other parties (7.71%)

=== Overview ===
Prior to 2008, Riverside County was a Republican stronghold in presidential and congressional elections. Between its creation in 1893 and 2004, it voted for the Democratic presidential nominee only three times: Franklin D. Roosevelt in 1936 (by a margin of 337 votes, or 0.99%), Lyndon B. Johnson in 1964 (by a margin of 19,363 votes, or 13.65%), and Bill Clinton in 1992 (by a margin of 6,784 votes, or 1.58%). In 1932, it was one of only two counties in the entire West Coast to vote for Republican president Herbert Hoover over Roosevelt during the latter's landslide victory. In 2024, it was one of ten counties that flipped for Donald Trump after voting for Biden in 2020, and was one of six that voted for the Republican presidential candidate for the first time in 20 years since George W. Bush in 2004. At the state level, Riverside remains one of the most conservative counties in Southern California and is frequently the only county in the region to not vote for Democratic candidates, having not voted for a Democrat for governor since 1998 (and having only voted three times for Democrats in the past century).

At the local level, Democrats are strongest in Riverside County in large cities such as Riverside, Perris, and Moreno Valley, performing especially well in majority Black and Hispanic areas, although those have been shifting heavily to the right. Democrats are also strongest in progressive-leaning White areas and college campuses such as Downtown Riverside, the area surrounding UC Riverside, the LGBT enclave of Palm Springs and most of the Hispanic-majority Coachella Valley.

Republicans perform especially well in the wealthy San Diegan exurbs in the Temecula Valley as well as more middle-class white cities such as Lake Elsinore, Wildomar, and Menifee. Republicans are also usually more successful in the rural areas of the county as well as wealthy retirement enclaves such as Canyon Lake and Bermuda Dunes. Republicans have been consistently gaining in almost all areas of the county, however, and in 2024 put up massive gains in both affluent suburbs and blue-collar majority Hispanic areas, even flipping the city of Jurupa Valley, one of the most Hispanic cities in Riverside County.

United States presidential election results for Riverside County, California
Year	Republican		Democratic		Third party(ies)	
Year	No.	%	No.	%	No.	%
1896	2,063	53.06%	1,684	43.31%	141	3.63%
1900	2,329	61.14%	1,134	29.77%	346	9.08%
1904	2,638	65.23%	678	16.77%	728	18.00%
1908	3,229	57.24%	1,374	24.36%	1,038	18.40%
1912	124	1.23%	2,963	29.33%	7,016	69.44%
1916	7,452	54.64%	4,561	33.44%	1,626	11.92%
1920	9,124	69.55%	2,798	21.33%	1,196	9.12%
1924	9,619	61.99%	1,318	8.49%	4,579	29.51%
1928	17,600	77.94%	4,769	21.12%	212	0.94%
1932	14,112	50.20%	12,755	45.37%	1,245	4.43%
1936	16,674	48.89%	17,011	49.88%	422	1.24%
1940	21,779	51.39%	20,003	47.20%	598	1.41%
1944	23,168	53.94%	19,439	45.26%	346	0.81%
1948	32,209	55.66%	23,305	40.28%	2,350	4.06%
1952	51,692	65.08%	26,948	33.93%	788	0.99%
1956	56,766	62.16%	34,098	37.34%	465	0.51%
1960	65,855	56.15%	50,877	43.38%	544	0.46%
1964	61,165	43.14%	80,528	56.79%	95	0.07%
1968	83,414	52.90%	61,146	38.78%	13,110	8.31%
1972	108,120	58.00%	71,591	38.41%	6,693	3.59%
1976	97,774	49.24%	96,228	48.46%	4,556	2.29%
1980	145,642	59.87%	76,650	31.51%	20,986	8.63%
1984	182,324	63.48%	102,043	35.53%	2,835	0.99%
1988	199,979	59.46%	133,122	39.58%	3,247	0.97%
1992	159,457	37.06%	166,241	38.64%	104,577	24.30%
1996	178,611	45.61%	168,579	43.05%	44,423	11.34%
2000	231,955	51.42%	202,576	44.90%	16,596	3.68%
2004	322,473	57.83%	228,806	41.04%	6,300	1.13%
2008	310,041	47.90%	325,017	50.21%	12,241	1.89%
2012	318,127	48.06%	329,063	49.71%	14,717	2.22%
2016	333,243	44.35%	373,695	49.73%	44,453	5.92%
2020	449,144	45.04%	528,340	52.98%	19,672	1.97%
2024	463,677	49.30%	451,782	48.04%	25,051	2.66%

In the United States House of Representatives, Riverside County is split between 6 congressional districts:

- California's 25th congressional district, represented by Democrat Raul Ruiz
- California's 35th congressional district, represented by Democrat Norma Torres
- California's 39th congressional district, represented by Democrat Mark Takano
- California's 40th congressional district, represented by Republican Young Kim
- California's 41st congressional district, represented by Republican Ken Calvert and
- California's 48th congressional district, represented by Republican Darrell Issa.

In the California State Senate, the county is split between four legislative districts:

- the 18th senatorial district, represented by Democrat Steve Padilla,
- the 19th senatorial district, represented by Republican Rosilicie Ochoa Bogh,
- the 31st senatorial district, represented by Democrat Sabrina Cervantes, and
- the 32nd senatorial district, represented by Republican Kelly Seyarto.

In the California State Assembly, the county is split between six legislative districts:

- the 36th Assembly district, represented by Republican Jeff Gonzalez,
- the 47th Assembly district, represented by Republican Greg Wallis,
- the 58th Assembly district, represented by Republican Leticia Castillo,
- the 60th Assembly district, represented by Democrat Corey Jackson,
- the 63rd Assembly district, represented by Republican Natasha Johnson, and
- the 71st Assembly district, represented by Republican Kate Sanchez.

== Crime ==
The following table includes the number of incidents reported and the rate per 1,000 persons for each type of offense.

Population and crime rates
Population	2,154,844	
Violent crime	7,284	3.38
Homicide	91	0.04
Forcible rape	424	0.20
Robbery	2,602	1.21
Aggravated assault	4,167	1.93
Property crime	37,803	17.54
Burglary	17,308	8.03
Larceny-theft (Note: Only larceny-theft cases involving property over $400 in value are reported as property crimes.)	35,135	16.31
Motor vehicle theft	8,641	4.01
Arson	283	0.13

=== Cities by population and crime rates ===
Cities by population and crime rates
City	Population	Violent crimes	Violent crime rate per 1,000 persons	Property crimes	Property crime rate per 1,000 persons
Banning	30,541	148	4.85	708	23.18
Beaumont	38,072	103	2.71	1,342	35.25
Blythe	21,323	73	3.42	759	35.60
Calimesa	8,136	13	1.60	202	24.83
Canyon Lake	10,905	11	1.01	209	19.17
Cathedral City	52,867	204	3.86	1,576	29.81
Coachella	42,034	265	6.30	1,547	36.80
Corona	157,342	210	1.33	4,143	26.33
Desert Hot Springs	27,929	344	12.32	1,157	41.43
Eastvale	55,439	41	0.74	1,007	18.16
Hemet	81,213	406	5.00	3,486	42.92
Indian Wells	5,120	2	0.39	203	39.65
Indio	78,501	450	5.73	2,791	35.55
Jurupa Valley	97,577	312	3.20	3,174	32.53
Lake Elsinore	53,912	130	2.41	1,932	35.84
La Quinta	38,690	150	3.88	1,669	43.14
Menifee	80,047	87	1.09	1,942	24.26
Moreno Valley	199,673	706	3.54	6,371	31.91
Murrieta	106,839	70	0.66	1,715	16.05
Norco	27,850	56	2.01	580	20.83
Palm Desert	50,021	104	2.08	2,322	46.42
Palm Springs	45,996	302	6.57	2,232	48.53
Perris	70,616	240	3.40	2,081	29.47
Rancho Mirage	17,778	23	1.29	726	40.84
Riverside	313,532	1,389	4.43	10,818	34.50
San Jacinto	45,637	137	3.00	1,479	32.41
Temecula	103,414	97	0.94	2,440	23.59
Wildomar	33,227	53	1.60	707	21.28

== Education ==
=== Universities and colleges ===
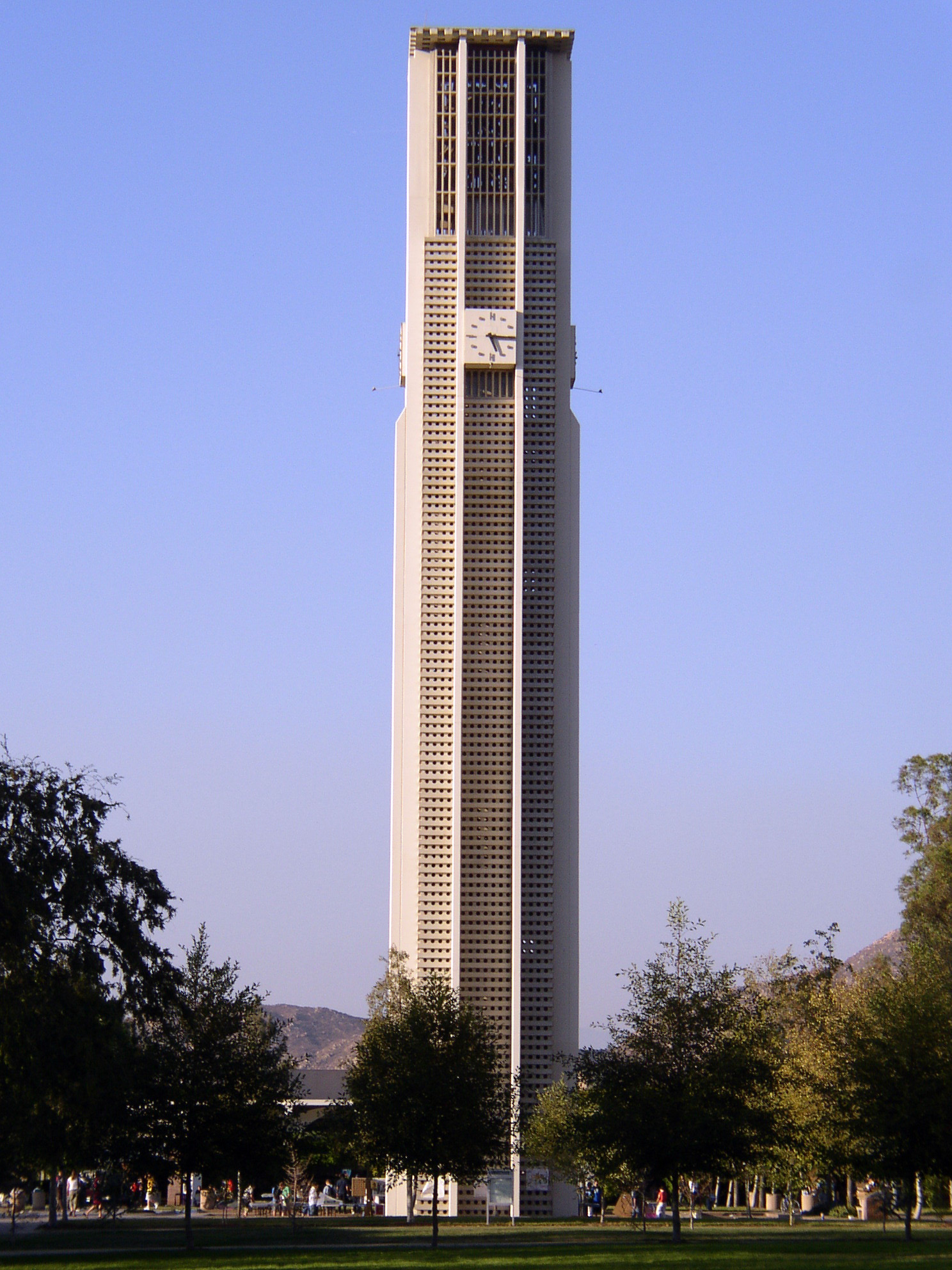
The 161-foot, 48-bell carillon tower at the University of California, Riverside, designed by A. Quincy Jones.

- Azusa Pacific University – Murrieta
- Brandman University }}, part of the Chapman University System – Moreno Valley, Palm Desert, Riverside and Temecula
- California Baptist University – Riverside
- California Southern Law School – Riverside
- California State University, San Bernardino, Palm Desert Campus – Palm Desert
- California State University, San Marcos, Temecula Satellite Campus – Temecula
- College of the Desert – Palm Desert and Indio
- La Sierra University – Riverside
- Mayfield College – Cathedral City
- Mt. San Jacinto College – Banning, Menifee, San Jacinto, Temecula
- Olivet University – Anza
- Palo Verde College – Blythe
- Riverside Community College District
  - Riverside City College
  - Moreno Valley College
  - Norco College
- Santa Barbara Business College – Palm Desert
- University of California, Riverside – Palm Desert and Riverside
- University of Phoenix – Murrieta and Palm Desert

=== K-12 schools ===
Public school districts

K-12 unified:

- Alvord Unified School District
- Banning Unified School District
- Beaumont Unified School District
- Coachella Valley Unified School District
- Colton Joint Unified School District
- Corona-Norco Unified School District
- Desert Center Unified School District
- Desert Sands Unified School District
- Hemet Unified School District
- Jurupa Unified School District
- Lake Elsinore Unified School District
- Moreno Valley Unified School District
- Murrieta Valley Unified School District
- Palm Springs Unified School District
- Palo Verde Unified School District
- Riverside Unified School District
- San Jacinto Unified School District
- Temecula Valley Unified School District
- Val Verde Unified School District
- Yucaipa-Calimesa Joint Unified School District

Secondary:

- Perris Union High School District

Elementary:

- Menifee Union School District
- Nuview Union Elementary School District
- Perris Elementary School District
- Romoland Elementary School District

State-operated schools

- California School for the Deaf, Riverside

Bureau of Indian Education-operated schools

- Sherman Indian High School

== Transportation ==
=== Major highways ===
- I-10
  - I-10 BL (Blythe)
- I-15
- I-215
- US 95
- SR 60 – former US 60
- SR 62
- SR 71
- SR 74
- SR 78
- SR 79
- SR 86
- SR 91
- SR 111
- SR 177
- SR 243
- SR 371

=== Public transportation ===
- Riverside Transit Agency serves the western third of Riverside County, as far east as Banning.
- SunLine Transit Agency serves Palm Springs and the Coachella Valley area.
- RidePV (formerly Palo Verde Valley Transit Agency) provides service in Blythe, near the Arizona border.
- Beaumont Transit serves the city of Beaumont.
- Banning Connect serves the city of Banning.
- Corona Cruiser serves the city of Corona.
- Riverside County is also served by Greyhound buses.

Amtrak trains stop in Riverside and Palm Springs, and Amtrak California provides bus connections to the Gold Runner in Riverside–Downtown, Beaumont, Palm Springs, Thousand Palms, Indio, Moreno Valley, Perris, Sun City, and Hemet. Amtrak Thruway buses connect Fullerton to Palm Springs and Indio.

Metrolink trains serve nine stations in Riverside County: Riverside–Downtown, Riverside–La Sierra, Corona–North Main, Corona–West, Jurupa Valley/Pedley, Riverside–Hunter Park/UCR, Moreno Valley/March Field, Perris–Downtown, and Perris–South. These trains provide service to Orange, San Bernardino and Los Angeles counties seven days a week, with a primarily commuter-oriented schedule.

=== Airports ===
==== Military air bases ====
- March Air Reserve Base (former March Air Force Base)

==== Commercial airports ====
- Palm Springs International Airport

==== General aviation airports ====
- Banning Municipal Airport
- Bermuda Dunes Airport
- Blythe Airport
- Corona Municipal Airport
- Flabob Airport, Riverside
- French Valley Airport (Temecula Valley)
- Hemet-Ryan Airport (San Jacinto Valley)
- Jacqueline Cochran Regional Airport, Thermal (Coachella Valley)
- Perris Valley Airport
- Riverside Municipal Airport

== Military installations ==
- Active
  - Chocolate Mountain Aerial Gunnery Range
  - March Air Reserve Base
  - Naval Weapons Station Seal Beach Detachment Norco
    - Naval Surface Warfare Center, Corona Division
- Historical
  - Desert Training Center
    - Blythe Army Airfield
    - Desert Center Army Airfield
    - Palm Springs Army Airfield
    - Rice Army Airfield
    - Shaver's Summit Army Airfield
    - Thermal Army Airfield (Also named Naval Air Facility Thermal (historical))
  - Hemet Army Airfield

== Points of interest ==
- Castle Park (amusement park)
- The Cheech Marin Center for Chicano Art & Culture
- Empire Polo Club, location of the Coachella and Stagecoach music festivals
- Gold Base, international headquarters of the Church of Scientology and Golden Era Productions
- Indian Wells Tennis Garden
- Joshua Tree National Park
- Living Desert Zoo and Gardens
- March Field Air Museum
- Mission Inn Hotel & Spa
- Orange Empire Railway Museum
- Orocopia Mountains Wilderness
- Palm Springs Aerial Tramway and Mount San Jacinto State Park
- Palm Springs Desert Museum
- Ramona Bowl, Home of The Ramona Pageant
- Riverside Art Museum
- Riverside County fair grounds, location of the Riverside County Fair and National Date Festival
- Riverside National Cemetery, including the Medal of Honor Memorial
- Salton Sea State Recreation Area
- Santa Rosa Plateau
- Sunnylands Center & Gardens
- Temecula Valley AVA Wine Region
- Western Science Center

== Communities ==
=== Cities ===
City	Year incorporated	Population, 2020	Median household income, 2019
Banning	1913	29,505	$42,274
Beaumont	1912	53,036	$84,105
Blythe	1916	18,317	$45,385
Calimesa	1990	10,026	$56,903
Canyon Lake	1990	11,082	$100,682
Cathedral City	1981	51,493	$46,521
Coachella	1946	41,941	$34,224
Corona	1896	157,136	$86,790
Desert Hot Springs	1963	32,512	$33,046
Eastvale	2010	69,757	$119,213
Hemet	1910	89,833	$39,653
Indian Wells	1967	4,757	$107,500
Indio	1930	89,137	$74,774
Jurupa Valley	2011	105,053	$76,090
Lake Elsinore	1888	70,265	$77,090
La Quinta	1982	37,558	$77,839
Menifee	2008	102,527	$77,033
Moreno Valley	1984	208,634	$65,449
Murrieta	1991	110,949	$100,080
Norco	1964	26,316	$102,817
Palm Desert	1973	51,163	$59,977
Palm Springs	1938	44,575	$53,441
Perris	1911	78,700	$70,714
Rancho Mirage	1973	16,999	$78,682
Riverside	1883	314,998	$71,967
San Jacinto	1888	53,898	$52,009
Temecula	1989	110,003	$95,918
Wildomar	2008	36,875	$74,991

=== Census-designated places ===
- Aguanga
- Anza
- Bermuda Dunes
- Cabazon
- Cherry Valley
- Coronita
- Desert Center
- Desert Edge
- Desert Palms
- East Hemet
- El Cerrito
- El Sobrante
- French Valley
- Garnet
- Good Hope
- Green Acres
- Highgrove
- Home Gardens
- Homeland
- Idyllwild
- Indio Hills
- Lake Mathews
- Lake Riverside
- Lakeland Village
- Lakeview
- March ARB
- Mead Valley
- Meadowbrook
- Mecca
- Mesa Verde
- Mountain Center
- North Shore
- Nuevo
- Oasis
- Ripley
- Romoland
- Sage
- Sky Valley
- Temescal Valley
- Thermal
- Thousand Palms
- Valle Vista
- Vista Santa Rosa
- Warm Springs
- Whitewater
- Winchester
- Woodcrest

=== Unincorporated communities ===
- Alberhill
- Alessandro
- Arnold Heights
- Bonnie Bell
- Box Springs
- Cahuilla
- Chiriaco Summit
- Desert Beach
- Edgemont
- El Cariso
- Fern Valley
- Gilman Hot Springs
- La Cresta
- Lake Tamarisk
- North Palm Springs
- Pine Cove
- Pinyon Pines
- Radec
- Rancho Capistrano
- Snow Creek
- Thomas Mountain

=== Former census designated places ===
- Crestmore Heights, annexed to Jurupa Valley

=== Ghost towns ===
- Dos Palmas
- Eagle Mountain
- Fertilla
- Hell
- La Placita
- Leon
- Midland
- Pinacate
- Saahatpa
- Temescal
- Terra Cotta
- Willow Springs Station

=== Indian reservations ===
Riverside County has 12 federally recognized Indian reservations, which ties it with Sandoval County, New Mexico, for second most of any county in the United States. (Sandoval County, however, has two additional joint-use areas, shared between reservations. San Diego County, California has the most, with 18 reservations.)

- Agua Caliente Indian Reservation
- Augustine Indian Reservation
- Cabazon Indian Reservation
- Cahuilla Indian Reservation
- Colorado River Indian Reservation (partly in La Paz County, Arizona and San Bernardino County, California)
- Morongo Indian Reservation
- Pechanga Indian Reservation
- Ramona Village
- Santa Rosa Indian Reservation
- Soboba Band of Mission Indians
- Torres-Martinez Indian Reservation (partly in Imperial County, California)
- Twenty-Nine Palms Indian Reservation (partly in San Bernardino County, California)

=== Population ranking ===
The population ranking of the following table is based on the 2020 census of Riverside County.

† county seat

Rank	City/Town/etc.	Municipal type	Population (2020 Census)
1	† Riverside	City	314,998
2	Moreno Valley	City	208,634
3	Corona	City	157,136
4	Murrieta	City	110,949
5	Temecula	City	110,003
6	Jurupa Valley	City	105,053
7	Menifee	City	102,527
8	Hemet	City	89,833
9	Indio	City	89,137
10	Perris	City	78,700
11	Lake Elsinore	City	70,265
12	Eastvale	City	69,757
13	San Jacinto	City	53,898
14	Beaumont	City	53,036
15	Cathedral City	City	51,493
16	Palm Desert	City	51,163
17	Palm Springs	City	44,575
18	Coachella	City	41,941
19	La Quinta	City	37,558
20	Wildomar	City	36,875
21	French Valley	CDP	35,280
22	Desert Hot Springs	City	32,512
23	Banning	City	29,505
24	Agua Caliente Indian Reservation	AIAN	27,090
25	Norco	City	26,316
26	Temescal Valley	CDP	26,232
27	Mead Valley	CDP	19,819
28	East Hemet	CDP	19,432
29	Blythe	City	18,317
30	Rancho Mirage	City	16,999
31	Valle Vista	CDP	16,194
32	Woodcrest	CDP	15,378
33	El Sobrante	CDP	14,039
34	Lakeland Village	CDP	12,364
35	Home Gardens	CDP	11,203
36	Canyon Lake	City	11,082
37	Calimesa	City	10,026
38	Good Hope	CDP	9,468
39	Bermuda Dunes	CDP	8,244
40	Mecca	CDP	8,219
41	Thousand Palms	CDP	7,967
42	Highgrove	CDP	7,515
43	Garnet	CDP	7,118
44	Homeland	CDP	6,772
45	Nuevo	CDP	6,733
46	Desert Palms	CDP	6,686
47	Cherry Valley	CDP	6,509
48	Lake Mathews	CDP	5,972
49	El Cerrito	CDP	5,058
50	Indian Wells	City	4,757
51	Oasis	CDP	4,468
52	Desert Edge	CDP	4,180
53	Idyllwild-Pine Cove	CDP	4,163
54	North Shore	CDP	3,585
55	Torres-Martinez Reservation	AIAN	3,454
56	Sage	CDP	3,370
57	Meadowbrook	CDP	3,142
58	Anza	CDP	3,075
59	Winchester	CDP	3,068
60	Green Acres	CDP	2,918
61	Thermal	CDP	2,676
62	Coronita	CDP	2,639
63	Cabazon	CDP	2,629
64	Vista Santa Rosa	CDP	2,607
65	Sky Valley	CDP	2,411
66	Romoland	CDP	2,005
67	Lakeview	CDP	1,977
68	Warm Springs	CDP	1,586
69	Colorado River Indian Reservation	AIAN	1,395
70	Lake Riverside	CDP	1,375
71	Morongo Reservation	AIAN	1,243
72	Indio Hills	CDP	1,048
73	Aguanga	CDP	989
74	Whitewater	CDP	984
75	March ARB	CDP	809
76	Mesa Verde	CDP	766
77	Pechanga Reservation	AIAN	582
78	Soboba Reservation	AIAN	567
79	Ripley	CDP	538
80	Desert Center	CDP	256
81	Cahuilla Reservation	AIAN	229
82	Cabazon Reservation	AIAN	192
83	Santa Rosa Reservation	AIAN	131
84	Mountain Center	CDP	66
85	Twenty-Nine Reservation	AIAN	5
86	Augustine Reservation	AIAN	0
87	Ramona Village	AIAN	0

== Climate ==
Riverside County

Climate chart (precipitation, max. and min. temperature)
J	F	M	A	M	J	J	A	S	O	N	D
8 20 7	12 24 9	4 31 13	3 37 17	1 45 21	1 44 27	16 46 28	19 44 27	8 45 25	2 36 20	6 28 11	15 20 6
- █ Average max. and min. temperatures in °C
- █ Precipitation totals in mm
Imperial conversion
J	F	M	A	M	J	J	A	S	O	N	D
0.3 68 45	0.5 75 48	0.2 88 55	0.1 99 63	0 113 70	0 111 81	0.6 115 82	0.7 111 81	0.3 113 77	0.1 97 68	0.2 82 52	0.6 68 43
- █ Average max. and min. temperatures in °F
- █ Precipitation totals in inches

== See also ==
- USS Riverside (APA-102), a World War II attack transport
- Films set in Riverside County, California
- List of cemeteries in Riverside County, California
- National Register of Historic Places listings in Riverside County, California
- KPRO (California), a radio station that served the county
