= Desert Palms, California =

Desert Palms
- census-designated place
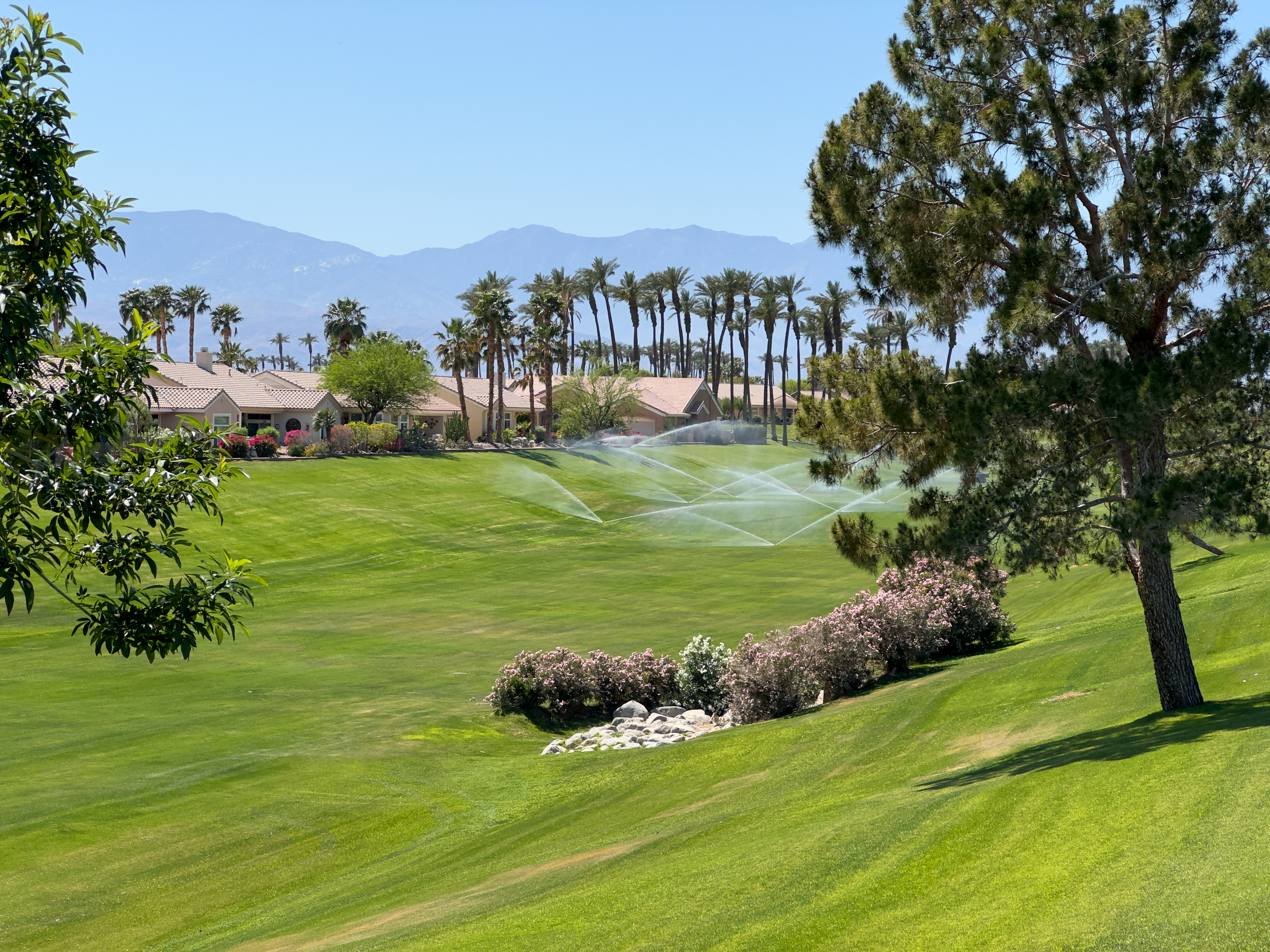
- Desert Palms, California

- Location of Desert Palms in Riverside County, California.

- Position in California.
- Coordinates: 33°46′44″N 116°17′35″W
- Country: United States
- State: California
- County: Riverside

Area
  - Total: 2.67 sq mi (6.92 km^{2})
  - Land: 2.67 sq mi (6.92 km^{2})
  - Water: 0 sq mi (0.00 km^{2}) 0.03%
- Elevation: 112 ft (34 m)

Population (2020)
  - Total: 6,686
  - Density: 2,503.5/sq mi (966.59/km^{2})
- Time zone: UTC-8 (Pacific (PST))
  - Summer (DST): UTC-7 (PDT)
- ZIP Code: 92211
- GNIS feature ID: 2629131

Desert Palms is a census-designated place in the Coachella Valley of eastern Riverside County, southern California. As of the 2020 census, Desert Palms had a population of 6,686. A gated 55+ senior living community, Sun City Palm Desert, comprises the majority of the included area.

== Sun City Palm Desert ==
Sun City Palm Desert is a master-planned retirement community located on the north side of Interstate 10, just northeast of the city limits of Palm Desert, and about 7.7 miles from downtown Palm Desert. All residences in the community use Palm Desert, CA 92211 as part of their address. The community association address is 38180 Del Webb Blvd., Palm Desert, CA 92211.

Sun City Palm Desert was developed by Del E. Webb Corp. (acquired by Pulte Homes in 2001). Construction began in 1992 and was completed in 2003. The original name was Sun City Palm Springs from 1991 to 1996.

Sun City Palm Desert is an active 55+ gated retirement community, with 9,000 residents, 5,000 all single-level homes, 1,600 acres, and numerous amenities and activities for its residents.

== Geography ==
Desert Palms is in the Colorado Desert, at an elevation of 112 feet (34 m).

According to the United States Census Bureau, the CDP covers an area of 2.7 square miles (6.9 km^{2}), 99.97% of it land and 0.03% of it water. The 2010 United States census reported Desert Palms's population was 6,957.

== Demographics ==
Historical population
| Census | Pop. | Note | %± |
|---|---|---|---|
| 2010 | 6,957 | | — |
| 2020 | 6,686 | | −3.9% |
U.S. Decennial Census; 1860–1870 1880-1890; 1900 1910 1920; 1930 1940 1950; 1960 1970 1980; 1990 2000 2010

Desert Palms first appeared as a census designated place in the 2010 U.S. census.

=== Racial and ethnic composition ===
Desert Palms CDP, California – Racial and ethnic composition Note: the US Census treats Hispanic/Latino as an ethnic category. This table excludes Latinos from the racial categories and assigns them to a separate category. Hispanics/Latinos may be of any race.
| Race / Ethnicity (NH = Non-Hispanic) | Pop 2010 | Pop 2020 | % 2010 | % 2020 |
|---|---|---|---|---|
| White alone (NH) | 6,581 | 6,116 | 94.60% | 91.47% |
| Black or African American alone (NH) | 57 | 82 | 0.82% | 1.23% |
| Native American or Alaska Native alone (NH) | 8 | 6 | 0.11% | 0.09% |
| Asian alone (NH) | 94 | 108 | 1.35% | 1.62% |
| Native Hawaiian or Pacific Islander alone (NH) | 5 | 7 | 0.07% | 0.10% |
| Other race alone (NH) | 0 | 9 | 0.00% | 0.13% |
| Mixed race or Multiracial (NH) | 35 | 100 | 0.50% | 1.50% |
| Hispanic or Latino (any race) | 177 | 258 | 2.54% | 3.86% |
| Total | 6,957 | 6,686 | 100.00% | 100.00% |

=== 2020 census ===
As of the 2020 census, Desert Palms had a population of 6,686. The population density was 2,503.2 inhabitants per square mile (966.5/km^{2}). The median age was 76.6 years. The age distribution was 0.4% under the age of 18, 0.3% aged 18 to 24, 0.9% aged 25 to 44, 11.4% aged 45 to 64, and 87.0% who were 65 years of age or older. For every 100 females, there were 74.4 males, and for every 100 females age 18 and over there were 74.2 males age 18 and over.

The census reported that 100.0% of the population lived in households, 3 people (0.0%) lived in non-institutionalized group quarters, and no one was institutionalized.

100.0% of residents lived in urban areas, while 0.0% lived in rural areas.

There were 4,090 households, out of which 1.4% included children under the age of 18, 50.0% were married-couple households, 4.1% were cohabiting couple households, 34.3% had a female householder with no spouse or partner present, and 11.7% had a male householder with no spouse or partner present. 39.8% of households were one person, and 35.6% were one person aged 65 or older. The average household size was 1.63. There were 2,241 families (54.8% of all households).

There were 5,193 housing units at an average density of 1,944.2 units per square mile (750.7 units/km^{2}), of which 4,090 (78.8%) were occupied. Of these, 88.6% were owner-occupied, and 11.4% were occupied by renters. 21.2% of housing units were vacant. The homeowner vacancy rate was 3.2%, and the rental vacancy rate was 17.0%.

Racial composition as of the 2020 census
| Race | Number | Percent |
|---|---|---|
| White | 6,180 | 92.4% |
| Black or African American | 82 | 1.2% |
| American Indian and Alaska Native | 9 | 0.1% |
| Asian | 114 | 1.7% |
| Native Hawaiian and Other Pacific Islander | 9 | 0.1% |
| Some other race | 43 | 0.6% |
| Two or more races | 249 | 3.7% |

=== Demographic estimates ===
In 2023, the US Census Bureau estimated that 14.2% of the population were foreign-born. Of all people aged 5 or older, 92.6% spoke only English at home, 4.3% spoke Spanish, 2.7% spoke other Indo-European languages, 0.3% spoke Asian or Pacific Islander languages, and 0.2% spoke other languages. Of those aged 25 or older, 95.5% were high school graduates and 48.9% had a bachelor's degree.

=== Income and poverty ===
The median household income was $81,954, and the per capita income was $57,637. About 9.4% of families and 9.4% of the population were below the poverty line.

=== 2010 census ===
At the 2010 census Desert Palms had a population of 6,957. The population density was 2,604.5 inhabitants per square mile (1,005.6/km^{2}). The racial makeup of Desert Palms was 6,728 (96.7%) White, 59 (0.8%) African American, 16 (0.2%) Native American, 95 (1.4%) Asian, 5 (0.1%) Pacific Islander, 15 (0.2%) from other races, and 39 (0.6%) from two or more races. Hispanic or Latino of any race were 177 people (2.5%).

The whole population lived in households, no one lived in non-institutionalized group quarters and no one was institutionalized.

There were 4,104 households, 11 (0.3%) had children under the age of 18 living in them, 2,424 (59.1%) were opposite-sex married couples living together, 71 (1.7%) had a female householder with no husband present, 23 (0.6%) had a male householder with no wife present. There were 120 (2.9%) unmarried opposite-sex partnerships, and 46 (1.1%) same-sex married couples or partnerships. 1,381 households (33.7%) were one person and 1,208 (29.4%) had someone living alone who was 65 or older. The average household size was 1.70. There were 2,518 families (61.4% of households); the average family size was 2.04.

The age distribution was 17 people (0.2%) under the age of 18, 8 people (0.1%) aged 18 to 24, 67 people (1.0%) aged 25 to 44, 1,081 people (15.5%) aged 45 to 64, and 5,784 people (83.1%) who were 65 or older. The median age was 74.1 years. For every 100 females, there were 79.2 males. For every 100 females age 18 and over, there were 79.0 males.

There were 5,055 housing units at an average density of 1,892.4 per square mile, of the occupied units 3,747 (91.3%) were owner-occupied and 357 (8.7%) were rented. The homeowner vacancy rate was 2.4%; the rental vacancy rate was 17.7%. 6,420 people (92.3% of the population) lived in owner-occupied housing units and 537 people (7.7%) lived in rental housing units.

== See also ==
- Coachella Valley topics
- Populated places in the Colorado Desert
