= Warm Springs, California =

Warm Springs
- census-designated place
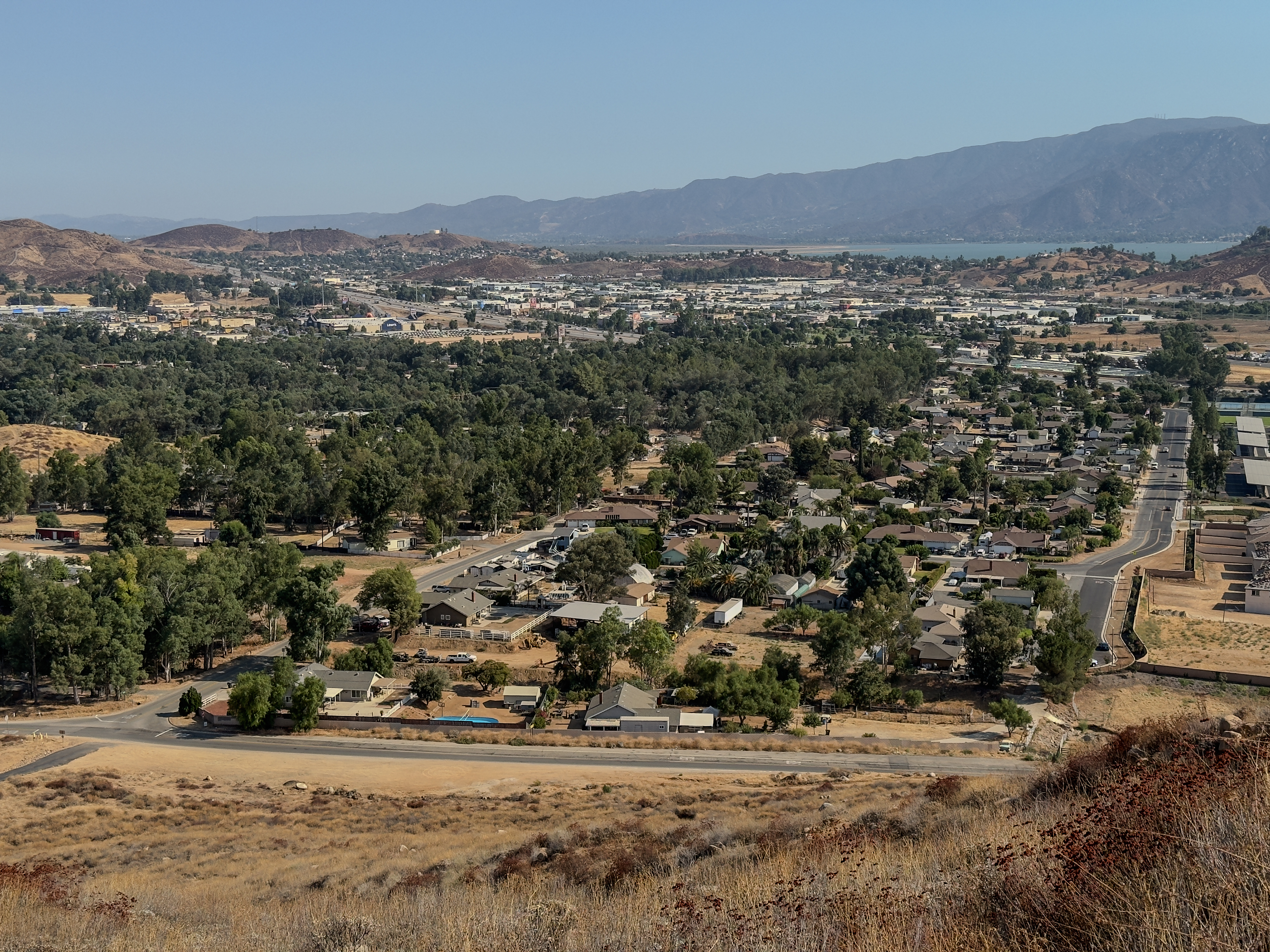
- A view of Warm Springs, California from the north on the Temescal Mountains

- Location in Riverside County, California

- Position in California.
- Coordinates: 33°42′10″N 117°19′57″W
- Country: United States
- State: California
- County: Riverside

Area
  - Total: 1.41 sq mi (3.66 km^{2})
  - Land: 1.41 sq mi (3.66 km^{2})
  - Water: 0 sq mi (0 km^{2}) 0%
- Elevation: 1,365 ft (416 m)

Population (2020)
  - Total: 1,586
  - Density: 1,120/sq mi (433/km^{2})
- Time zone: UTC-8 (Pacific (PST))
  - Summer (DST): UTC-7 (PDT)
- GNIS feature ID: 2583181

Warm Springs is a census-designated place in Riverside County, California. Warm Springs sits at an elevation of 1,365 feet (416 m). The 2020 United States census reported Warm Springs' population was 1,586.

== Geography ==
According to the United States Census Bureau, the CDP covers an area of 1.4 square miles (3.7 km^{2}), all of it land.

== Demographics ==
Historical population
Census	Pop.	Note	%±
2010	2,676		—
2020	1,586		−40.7%
U.S. Decennial Census; 1860–1870 1880-1890; 1900 1910 1920; 1930 1940 1950; 1960 1970 1980; 1990 2000 2010

Warm Springs first appeared as a census designated place in the 2010 U.S. census.

=== Racial and ethnic composition ===
Warm Springs CDP, California – Racial and ethnic composition Note: the US Census treats Hispanic/Latino as an ethnic category. This table excludes Latinos from the racial categories and assigns them to a separate category. Hispanics/Latinos may be of any race.
Race / Ethnicity (NH = Non-Hispanic)	Pop 2010	Pop 2020	% 2010	% 2020
White alone (NH)	1,139	539	42.56%	33.98%
Black or African American alone (NH)	118	15	4.41%	0.95%
Native American or Alaska Native alone (NH)	10	5	0.37%	0.32%
Asian alone (NH)	101	32	3.77%	2.02%
Native Hawaiian or Pacific Islander alone (NH)	14	1	0.52%	0.06%
Other race alone (NH)	0	5	0.00%	0.32%
Mixed race or Multiracial (NH)	62	66	2.32%	4.16%
Hispanic or Latino (any race)	1,232	923	46.04%	58.20%
Total	2,676	1,586	100.00%	100.00%

=== 2020 census ===
As of the 2020 census, Warm Springs had a population of 1,586 and a population density of 1,121.6 inhabitants per square mile (433.1/km^{2}). The median age was 35.9 years. The age distribution was 369 people (23.3%) under the age of 18, 148 people (9.3%) aged 18 to 24, 457 people (28.8%) aged 25 to 44, 385 people (24.3%) aged 45 to 64, and 227 people (14.3%) who were 65 years of age or older. For every 100 females, there were 108.7 males, and for every 100 females age 18 and over there were 106.6 males age 18 and over.

98.4% of residents lived in urban areas, while 1.6% lived in rural areas.

The whole population lived in households. There were 448 households, of which 170 (37.9%) had children under the age of 18 living in them. Of all households, 214 (47.8%) were married-couple households, 34 (7.6%) were cohabiting couple households, 98 (21.9%) were households with a male householder and no spouse or partner present, and 102 (22.8%) were households with a female householder and no spouse or partner present. About 65 households (14.5%) were made up of individuals, and 26 (5.8%) had someone living alone who was 65 years of age or older. The average household size was 3.54. There were 354 families (79.0% of all households).

There were 480 housing units at an average density of 339.5 units per square mile (131.1 units/km^{2}), of which 448 (93.3%) were occupied and 32 (6.7%) were vacant. Of occupied housing units, 283 (63.2%) were owner-occupied and 165 (36.8%) were occupied by renters. The homeowner vacancy rate was 2.1% and the rental vacancy rate was 5.2%.

Racial composition as of the 2020 census
Race	Number	Percent
White	674	42.5%
Black or African American	18	1.1%
American Indian and Alaska Native	29	1.8%
Asian	34	2.1%
Native Hawaiian and Other Pacific Islander	1	0.1%
Some other race	524	33.0%
Two or more races	306	19.3%

== Education ==
It is in the Lake Elsinore Unified School District.
