= Lake Riverside, California =

Lake Riverside
- census-designated place
- Location of Lake Riverside in Riverside County, California.

- Position in California.
- Coordinates: 33°31′02″N 116°48′38″W
- Country: United States
- State: California
- County: Riverside

Area
  - Total: 7.377 sq mi (19.106 km^{2})
  - Land: 7.293 sq mi (18.889 km^{2})
  - Water: 0.084 sq mi (0.218 km^{2}) 1.14%
- Elevation: 3,396 ft (1,035 m)

Population (2020)
  - Total: 1,375
  - Density: 188.5/sq mi (72.79/km^{2})
- Time zone: UTC-8 (Pacific (PST))
  - Summer (DST): UTC-7 (PDT)
- ZIP Code: 92536
- Area code: 951
- GNIS feature ID: 2583052

Lake Riverside is a census-designated place in the south western part of Riverside County, California. Lake Riverside sits at an elevation of 3,379 feet (1,030 m). The 2020 United States census reported Lake Riverside's population was 1,375. The community is named after the man-made Lake that the community surrounds.

== Geography and Geology ==
According to the United States Census Bureau, the census-designated place (CDP) covers an area of 7.4 square miles (19.1 km^{2}), 98.86% of it land, and 1.14% of it water.

The water part of the CDP, Lake Riverside, was artificially made when a private farming-ranching company owning the land needed a water reservoir for its operation. With the approval of the Army Corps of Engineers, a well was dug in 1962 to pipe water from underground springs to create the Lake in the low-lying areas of the Cahuilla Creek watershed and to sustain it. The Lake was enlarged to 55 acres (0.22 km^{2}) in 1970, after the property was purchased by a private developer to turn it into a rural residential subdivision. The original well from 1962 lasted to 1994, and a new well was dug in 1995 to sustain the Lake.

From early 2016 to late 2019, a swarm of small earthquakes occurred—ranging in magnitude from 0.7 to 4.4 -- the strongest one occurred in August 2018, south of Lake Riverside, just off Cahuilla Road (SR 371). The remaining more than 22,000 individual seismic events occurred near the western edge of the Cahuilla Reservation stretching 4 km (2.5 mi) northward to just east of the Lake and never generated any significant damage in four years. The cause of this Cahuilla seismic swarm was traced to a deep natural underground reservoir of fluid, about 8 km (5.0 mi) below the surface, injecting fluid into the base of the fault zone, triggering the swarm of seismic events as it diffused slowly up into the fault zone over the four years.

== Demographics ==
Historical population
Census	Pop.	Note	%±
2010	1,173		—
2020	1,375		17.2%
U.S. Decennial Census; 1860–1870 1880-1890; 1900 1910 1920; 1930 1940 1950; 1960 1970 1980; 1990 2000 2010

Lake Riverside first appeared as a census designated place in the 2010 U.S. census.

=== Racial and ethnic composition ===
Lake Riverside CDP, California – Racial and ethnic composition Note: the US Census treats Hispanic/Latino as an ethnic category. This table excludes Latinos from the racial categories and assigns them to a separate category. Hispanics/Latinos may be of any race.
Race / Ethnicity (NH = Non-Hispanic)	Pop 2010	Pop 2020	% 2010	% 2020
White alone (NH)	917	899	78.18%	65.38%
Black or African American alone (NH)	17	13	1.45%	0.95%
Native American or Alaska Native alone (NH)	14	33	1.19%	2.40%
Asian alone (NH)	2	40	0.17%	2.91%
Native Hawaiian or Pacific Islander alone (NH)	6	0	0.51%	0.00%
Other race alone (NH)	6	16	0.51%	1.16%
Mixed race or Multiracial (NH)	25	74	2.13%	5.38%
Hispanic or Latino (any race)	186	300	15.86%	21.82%
Total	1,173	1,375	100.00%	100.00%

=== 2020 census ===
As of the 2020 census, Lake Riverside had a population of 1,375. The population density was 188.5 inhabitants per square mile (72.8/km^{2}). 0.0% of residents lived in urban areas, while 100.0% lived in rural areas.

The age distribution was 299 people (21.7%) under the age of 18, 84 people (6.1%) aged 18 to 24, 306 people (22.3%) aged 25 to 44, 397 people (28.9%) aged 45 to 64, and 289 people (21.0%) who were 65 years of age or older. The median age was 44.6 years. For every 100 females there were 105.5 males, and for every 100 females age 18 and over there were 103.0 males age 18 and over.

The whole population lived in households. There were 509 households, of which 125 (24.6%) had children under the age of 18 living in them. Of all households, 292 (57.4%) were married-couple households, 26 (5.1%) were cohabiting couple households, 109 (21.4%) had a male householder and no spouse or partner present, and 82 (16.1%) had a female householder and no spouse or partner present. About 118 households (23.2%) were made up of individuals and 44 (8.6%) had someone living alone who was 65 years of age or older. The average household size was 2.7, and there were 360 families (70.7% of all households).

There were 561 housing units, of which 509 (90.7%) were occupied and 52 (9.3%) were vacant. There were 460 owner-occupied units (90.4% of occupied units) and 49 renter-occupied units (9.6% of occupied units). The homeowner vacancy rate was 1.3% and the rental vacancy rate was 2.0%.

Racial composition as of the 2020 census
Race	Number	Percent
White	983	71.5%
Black or African American	13	0.9%
American Indian and Alaska Native	38	2.8%
Asian	42	3.1%
Native Hawaiian and Other Pacific Islander	1	0.1%
Some other race	97	7.1%
Two or more races	201	14.6%

=== 2010 census ===
Lake Riverside first appeared as a census designated place in the 2010 U.S. census.

== Education ==
It is in the Hemet Unified School District.
