= Green Acres, California =

Green Acres
- census-designated place
- Location of Green Acres in Riverside County, California

- Position in California.
- Coordinates: 33°44′06″N 117°04′42″W
- Country: United States
- State: California
- County: Riverside

Area
  - Total: 1.400 sq mi (3.627 km^{2})
  - Land: 1.400 sq mi (3.627 km^{2})
  - Water: 0 sq mi (0 km^{2}) 0%
- Elevation: 1,555 ft (474 m)

Population (2020)
  - Total: 2,918
  - Density: 2,084/sq mi (804.5/km^{2})
- Time zone: UTC-8 (Pacific (PST))
  - Summer (DST): UTC-7 (PDT)
- GNIS feature ID: 2630600

Green Acres is a census-designated place in Riverside County, California. Green Acres sits at an elevation of 1,555 feet (474 m). The 2020 United States census reported Green Acres's population was 2,918.

== Geography ==
According to the United States Census Bureau, the CDP covers an area of 1.4 square miles (3.6 km^{2}), all of it land.

== Demographics ==
Historical population
Census	Pop.	Note	%±
2010	1,805		—
2020	2,918		61.7%
U.S. Decennial Census; 1860–1870 1880-1890; 1900 1910 1920; 1930 1940 1950; 1960 1970 1980; 1990 2000 2010

Green Acres first appeared as a census designated place in the 2000 U.S. census formed from part of the Winchester CDP and additional area.

=== Racial and ethnic composition ===
Green Acres CDP, California – Racial and ethnic composition Note: the US Census treats Hispanic/Latino as an ethnic category. This table excludes Latinos from the racial categories and assigns them to a separate category. Hispanics/Latinos may be of any race.
Race / Ethnicity (NH = Non-Hispanic)	Pop 2010	Pop 2020	% 2010	% 2020
White alone (NH)	822	821	45.54%	28.14%
Black or African American alone (NH)	25	110	1.39%	3.77%
Native American or Alaska Native alone (NH)	23	12	1.27%	0.41%
Asian alone (NH)	25	89	1.39%	3.05%
Native Hawaiian or Pacific Islander alone (NH)	2	2	0.11%	0.07%
Other race alone (NH)	5	19	0.28%	0.65%
Mixed race or Multiracial (NH)	47	111	2.60%	3.80%
Hispanic or Latino (any race)	856	1,754	47.42%	60.11%
Total	1,805	2,918	100.00%	100.00%

=== 2020 census ===
As of the 2020 census, Green Acres had a population of 2,918. The population density was 2,084.3 inhabitants per square mile (804.8/km^{2}).

Racial composition as of the 2020 census
Race	Number	Percent
White	1,162	39.8%
Black or African American	137	4.7%
American Indian and Alaska Native	68	2.3%
Asian	98	3.4%
Native Hawaiian and Other Pacific Islander	3	0.1%
Some other race	904	31.0%
Two or more races	546	18.7%

The census reported that 99.1% of the population lived in households, 27 people (0.9%) lived in non-institutionalized group quarters, and no one was institutionalized. 97.8% of residents lived in urban areas, while 2.2% lived in rural areas.

There were 785 households, out of which 43.8% included children under the age of 18. Of all households, 50.4% were married-couple households, 8.8% were cohabiting couple households, 24.3% had a female householder with no spouse or partner present, and 16.4% had a male householder with no spouse or partner present. 15.0% of households were one person, and 4.6% were one person aged 65 or older. The average household size was 3.68. There were 618 families (78.7% of all households).

The age distribution was 27.2% under the age of 18, 10.6% aged 18 to 24, 28.3% aged 25 to 44, 23.9% aged 45 to 64, and 10.0% who were 65 years of age or older. The median age was 33.0 years. For every 100 females, there were 104.5 males, and for every 100 females age 18 and over, there were 106.4 males age 18 and over.

There were 815 housing units at an average density of 582.1 units per square mile (224.8 units/km^{2}). Of these, 785 (96.3%) were occupied and 3.7% were vacant. Of occupied units, 66.9% were owner-occupied and 33.1% were occupied by renters. The homeowner vacancy rate was 0.7% and the rental vacancy rate was 3.7%.

=== Income and poverty ===
In 2023, the US Census Bureau estimated that the median household income in 2023 was $71,609, and the per capita income was $21,849. About 12.4% of families and 13.4% of the population were below the poverty line.

== Education ==
Most of the CDP is in the Hemet Unified School District, while a portion is in the Romoland Elementary School District and the Perris Union High School District for grades 9–12.
