= Cahuilla, California =

Unincorporated community in California, United States

Cahuilla
- Unincorporated community
- Location in California Cahuilla (the United States)
- Coordinates: 33°32′27″N 116°44′38″W
- Country: United States, part of the Cahuilla Reservation
- State: California
- County: Riverside County
- Elevation: 3,640 ft (1,110 m)

Cahuilla, pronounced /kəˈwiːə/, (formerly, Kawia, Coahuilla, Cohuilla, and Coahuila) is an unincorporated community in Riverside County, California. It is part of the Cahuilla Reservation and lies in a high desert valley at an elevation of 3642 feet (1110 m). It is located 27 miles (43.5 km) south by road from mile-high Idyllwild. Cahuilla is on SR 371, about 4 miles (6.4 km) west of Anza, California.

The Cahuilla Post Office first opened in 1888, moved in 1889 and 1895, closed in 1903, reopened in 1909, closed for a time in 1919, closed again in 1921, reopened in 1924 before closing for good in 1926. In 1926, the Anza Post Office was officially established.

Facilities in Cahuilla have addresses on Highway 371 and use Anza, CA as their postal code. The Cahuilla Casino, first opened in 1996, and Mountain Sky Travel Center, a convenience store and gas station first opened in 2015, are both owned by the Cahuilla Band of Mission Indians of the Cahuilla Reservation and both located in Cahuilla with addresses in nearby Anza. A new casino and hotel, after some delay from the coronavirus, replaced the old casino and was opened May 2020.

== 2016-2019 Cahuilla Seismic Swarm ==
From early 2016 to late 2019, Cahuilla got on the map when a swarm of earthquakes occurred nearby, less than 5 miles (8.0 km) to the southwest and near the western edge of the Cahuilla Reservation.

More than 22,000 individual seismic events were recorded, ranging in magnitude from 0.7 to 4.4. The strongest one occurred in August 2018, south of Lake Riverside, just off Cahuilla Road (SR 371). By using computer algorithms, researchers were able to piece together a detailed picture of the Cahuilla fault zone responsible for the earthquake swarm. The fault zone is no more than 50 m (160 ft) wide, 4 km (2.5 mi) long, with the earliest seismic swarm events localized down near the base at 9 km (5.6 mi) below the surface while the latest events migrating upwards to 5 km (3.1 mi) below the surface and spread throughout the fault zone's length. Containing complex subterranean horizontal channels and prominent bents in its depth profile, the fault zone sits on top of a deeper natural underground reservoir of fluid under pressure with a connector at 8 km (5.0 mi) below the surface that was initially sealed off from the fault zone. When that seal broke open in early 2016, fluids were injected up into the fault zone's base and diffused slowly through the complex channels up to 5 km (3.1 mi) below the surface, which triggered the prolonged earthquake swarm that lasted until late 2019. This analysis provides detailed evidence that fault zone valving is a mechanism for seismogenesis in swarms.
