= Desert Edge, California =

Desert Edge
- Unincorporated community Census-designated place
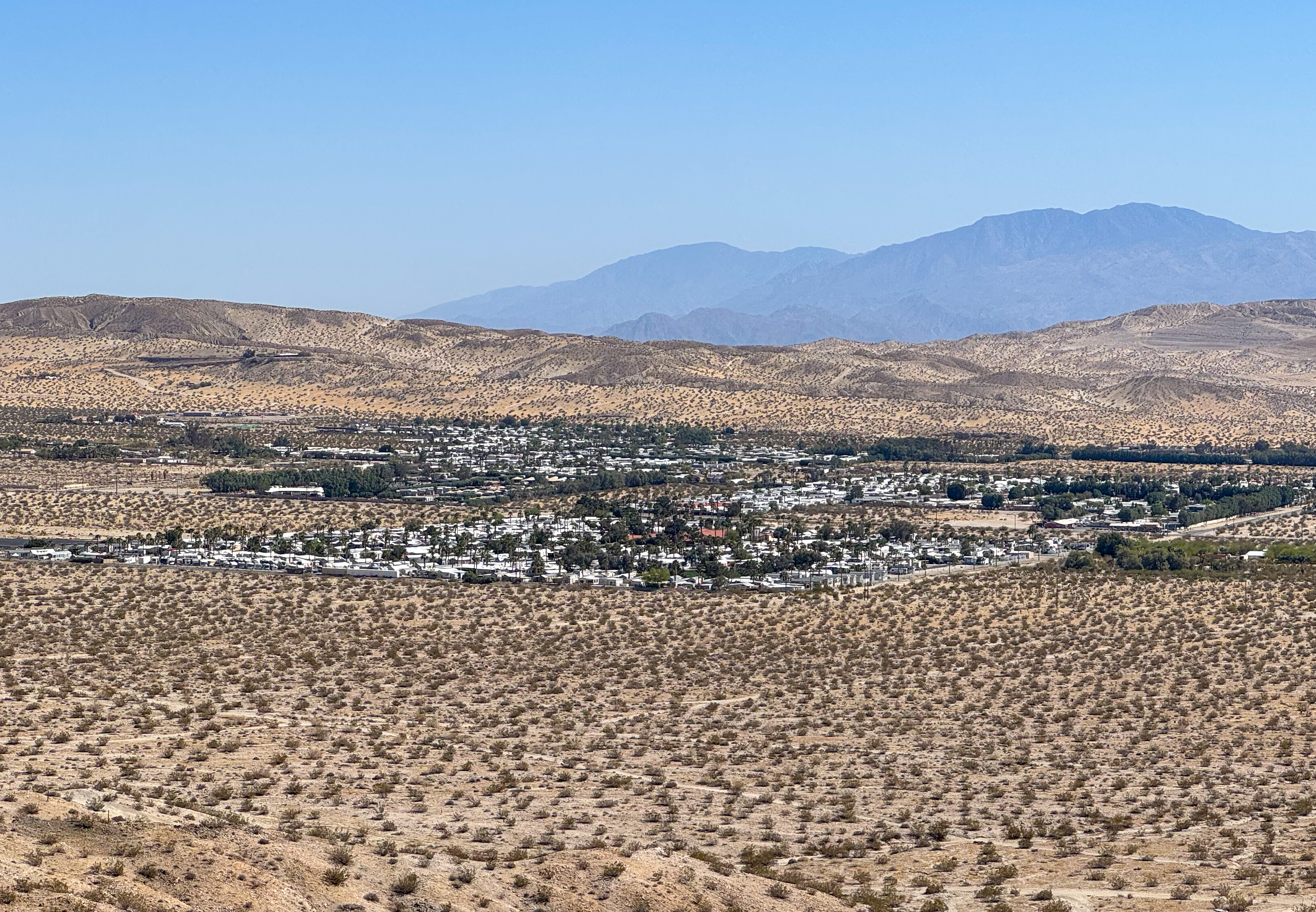
- Desert Edge with Indio Hills and Santa Rosa Mountains

- Location of Desert Edge in Riverside County, California.

- Position in California.
- Coordinates: 33°55′21″N 116°26′22″W
- Country: United States
- State: California
- County: Riverside

Area
  - Total: 2.27 sq mi (5.87 km^{2})
  - Land: 2.27 sq mi (5.87 km^{2})
  - Water: 0 sq mi (0.00 km^{2}) 0%
- Elevation: 994 ft (303 m)

Population (2020)
  - Total: 4,180
  - Density: 1,843.4/sq mi (711.74/km^{2})
- Time zone: UTC-8 (Pacific (PST))
  - Summer (DST): UTC-7 (PDT)
- GNIS feature ID: 2582994

Desert Edge is an unincorporated community and census-designated place (CDP) in Riverside County, California, United States. Desert Edge sits at an elevation of 994 feet (303 m). The 2020 United States census reported Desert Edge's population was 4,180.

== Geography ==
According to the United States Census Bureau, the CDP covers an area of 2.3 square miles (5.8 km^{2}), all of it land.

== Demographics ==
Historical population
Census	Pop.	Note	%±
2010	3,822		—
2020	4,180		9.4%
U.S. Decennial Census; 1860–1870 1880-1890; 1900 1910 1920; 1930 1940 1950; 1960 1970 1980; 1990 2000 2010

Desert Edge first appeared as a census designated place in the 2010 U.S. census.

=== Racial and ethnic composition ===
Desert Edge CDP, California – Racial and ethnic composition Note: the US Census treats Hispanic/Latino as an ethnic category. This table excludes Latinos from the racial categories and assigns them to a separate category. Hispanics/Latinos may be of any race.
Race / Ethnicity (NH = Non-Hispanic)	Pop 2010	Pop 2020	% 2010	% 2020
White alone (NH)	2,502	2,238	65.46%	53.54%
Black or African American alone (NH)	14	60	0.37%	1.44%
Native American or Alaska Native alone (NH)	24	19	0.63%	0.45%
Asian alone (NH)	28	76	0.73%	1.82%
Native Hawaiian or Pacific Islander alone (NH)	1	5	0.03%	0.12%
Other race alone (NH)	2	6	0.05%	0.14%
Mixed race or Multiracial (NH)	31	127	0.81%	3.04%
Hispanic or Latino (any race)	1,220	1,649	31.92%	39.45%
Total	3,822	4,180	100.00%	100.00%

=== 2020 census ===
The 2020 United States census reported that Desert Edge had a population of 4,180. The population density was 1,843.0 inhabitants per square mile (711.6/km^{2}). The racial makeup of Desert Edge was 59.0% White, 1.8% African American, 2.2% Native American, 1.9% Asian, 0.1% Pacific Islander, 24.2% from other races, and 10.9% from two or more races. Hispanic or Latino of any race were 39.4% of the population.

The whole population lived in households. There were 2,118 households, out of which 15.3% included children under the age of 18, 35.5% were married-couple households, 6.4% were cohabiting couple households, 33.4% had a female householder with no partner present, and 24.7% had a male householder with no partner present. 42.5% of households were one person, and 29.3% were one person aged 65 or older. The average household size was 1.97. There were 1,074 families (50.7% of all households).

The age distribution was 15.5% under the age of 18, 5.0% aged 18 to 24, 14.2% aged 25 to 44, 24.3% aged 45 to 64, and 40.9% who were 65 years of age or older. The median age was 60.2 years. For every 100 females, there were 97.0 males.

There were 3,658 housing units at an average density of 1,612.9 units per square mile (622.7 units/km^{2}), of which 2,118 (57.9%) were occupied. Of these, 77.6% were owner-occupied, and 22.4% were occupied by renters.

In 2023, the US Census Bureau estimated that the median household income was $40,089, and the per capita income was $28,259. About 12.0% of families and 17.3% of the population were below the poverty line.

=== 2010 census ===
At the 2010 census Desert Edge had a population of 3,822. The population density was 1,685.5 inhabitants per square mile (650.8/km^{2}). The racial makeup of Desert Edge was 3,051 (79.8%) White (65.5% Non-Hispanic White), 14 (0.4%) African American, 34 (0.9%) Native American, 28 (0.7%) Asian, 1 (0.0%) Pacific Islander, 624 (16.3%) from other races, and 70 (1.8%) from two or more races. Hispanic or Latino of any race were 1,220 persons (31.9%).

The whole population lived in households, no one lived in non-institutionalized group quarters and no one was institutionalized.

There were 1,969 households, 237 (12.0%) had children under the age of 18 living in them, 869 (44.1%) were opposite-sex married couples living together, 108 (5.5%) had a female householder with no husband present, 49 (2.5%) had a male householder with no wife present. There were 106 (5.4%) unmarried opposite-sex partnerships, and 33 (1.7%) same-sex married couples or partnerships. 783 households (39.8%) were one person and 509 (25.9%) had someone living alone who was 65 or older. The average household size was 1.94. There were 1,026 families (52.1% of households); the average family size was 2.59.

The age distribution was 514 people (13.4%) under the age of 18, 127 people (3.3%) aged 18 to 24, 474 people (12.4%) aged 25 to 44, 884 people (23.1%) aged 45 to 64, and 1,823 people (47.7%) who were 65 or older. The median age was 63.8 years. For every 100 females, there were 92.0 males. For every 100 females age 18 and over, there were 89.6 males.

There were 3,492 housing units at an average density of 1,540.0 per square mile, of the occupied units 1,707 (86.7%) were owner-occupied and 262 (13.3%) were rented. The homeowner vacancy rate was 5.5%; the rental vacancy rate was 21.3%. 3,222 people (84.3% of the population) lived in owner-occupied housing units and 600 people (15.7%) lived in rental housing units.

According to the 2010 United States Census, Desert Edge had a median household income of $35,089, with 22.4% of the population living below the federal poverty line.
