= Box Springs =

Box Springs might refer to:

== Locations ==
=== Canada ===
- Box Springs Road, an exit on Alberta Highway 1 in Canada

=== United States ===
- Box Springs, California
- Box Springs, Georgia
- Box Springs Mountain, a mountain in Southern California
  - Box Springs Mountains, a mountain range named after Box Springs Mountain
- Box Springs Reserve, part of the University of California Natural Reserve System
- Box Springs Elementary School, in the Moreno Valley Unified School District
- Box Springs Canyon, site of a 1906 auto race won by Leigh Lynch

== See also ==
- Box Spring, Yellowstone Park
- Box-spring, a type of bed base
