= Mountain Valley League =

High school athletic league in California

The Mountain Valley League is a high school athletic league that is part of the CIF Southern Section. Members public schools around Moreno Valley in Riverside County.

== Members ==
- Banning High School-Broncos
- Moreno Valley High School
- Pacific High School
- Rubidoux High School
- San Bernardino High School
- Vista Del Lago High School
