= Box Springs, California =

Unincorporated community in California, United States

- Unincorporated community
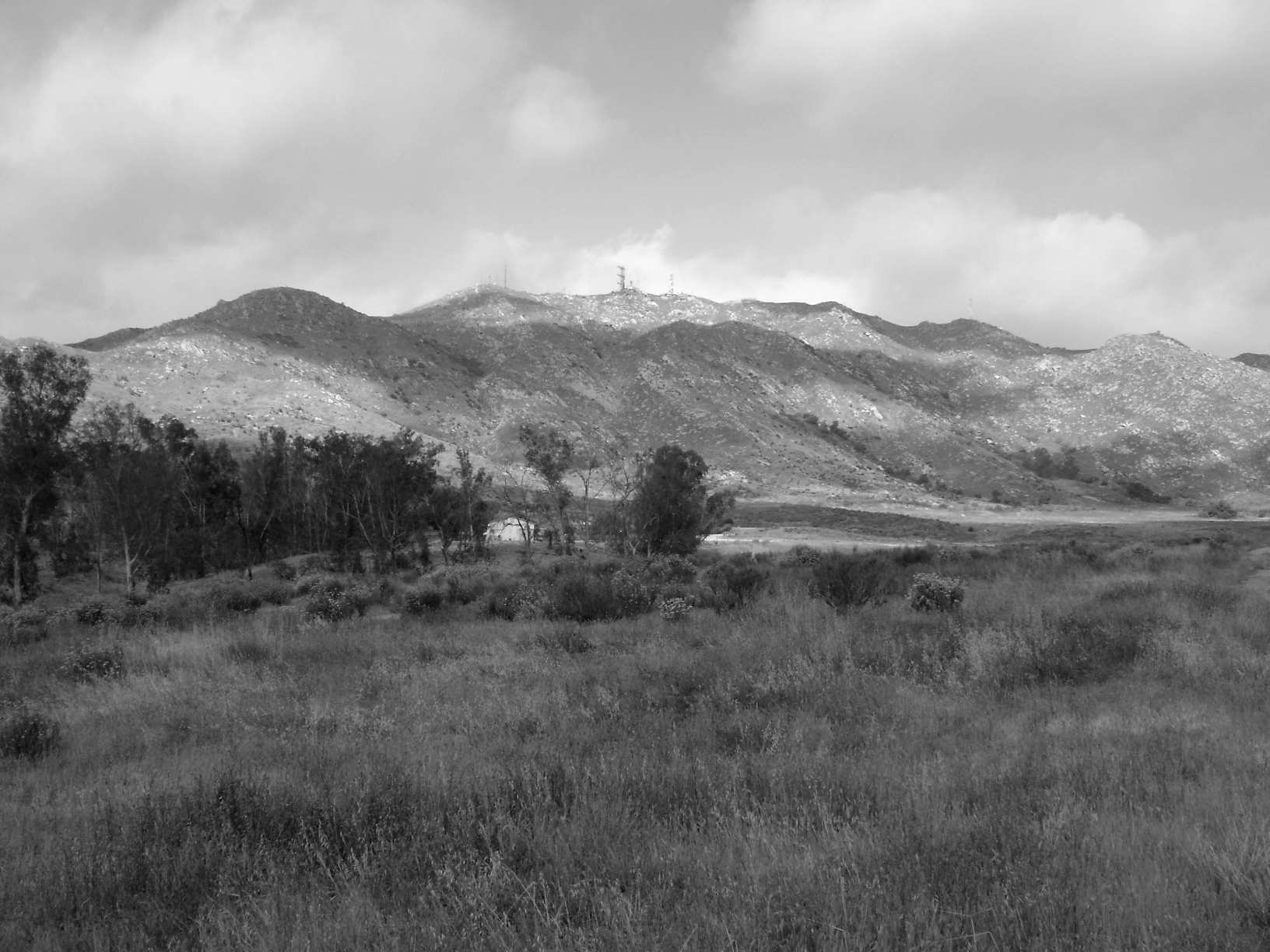
- Box Springs Reserve, named after Box Springs

- Location of Box Springs in California
- Coordinates: 33°56′48″N 117°17′47″W
- Country: United States
- State: California
- County: Riverside
- Elevation: 1,506 ft (459 m)
- Time zone: UTC-8 (PST)
  - Summer (DST): UTC-7 (PDT)
- ZIP code: 92507
- Area code: 951
- FIPS code: 06-06065
- GNIS feature ID: 1660366

The Box Spring is a spring in Riverside County, California, around which grew the town of Box Springs, an unincorporated community. It is in the Moreno Valley, five miles (8.0 km) east-southeast of downtown Riverside on Interstate 215/State Route 60 (the Moreno Valley Freeway). Box Springs is named on the 7.5 quadrangle map, Riverside East (1967).

== History ==
The town of Box Springs and the Box Springs Mountains are named after a little-known but "very important spring of water at the base of the mountain." In the 1860s, a local resident, John Brown Sr., made improvements to the fresh cold water spring by building a wooden box containment structure around it to improve access to its flow. The spring was well known to locals and travelers alike. In the 1880s, teamsters with horse-drawn wagons would frequently water their horses at the natural springs located in an arroyo (water canyon fed by an intermittent stream) in the range now known as the Box Mountains.

In the 1930s, Box Springs was known to have a gasoline filling station as well as a garage.

== Infrastructure ==
Although it is now a somewhat overlooked water source, part of the Moreno Valley gets its water supply from the Box Springs Mutual Water Company, fed by Box Springs; the water company was set up in the 1920s and currently distributes water to 430 acres (170 ha) with 600 hook-ups/connections.

The community has an elementary school called Box Springs Elementary School, which is part of the Moreno Valley Unified School District.

In 2018, construction had commenced in the Box Springs area on a 125-unit multifamily project called Continental Village, as well as a 266-unit project, Oak Park apartments.

== Box Springs Reserve ==
The Box Springs Reserve, which is facilitated by the University of California Natural Reserve System, is located on Box Springs Mountain on a steep granitic slope. It is named after the Box Springs cold freshwater and its associated seeps that feed an intermittent stream. The reserve provides habitat for many species including but not limited to 16 mammal species including mule deer (Odocoileus hemionus) and mountain lions (Felis concolor); 19 species of reptiles, three of which are considered rare species. Many bird species are seen there, and several species of raptors hunt in this habitat including the golden eagle, red-tailed hawk and turkey vulture.

Box Springs is mentioned in the introductory chapter "Evolution of the UC Natural Reserves" in the book, The Environmental Legacy of the University of California Natural Reserve System, and in the book Fire in California's Ecosystems.

== Box Springs Mountain Reserve ==
The UCR Box Springs Reserve is closed to the public, however the Box Springs Mountain Reserve is a Riverside County Park and is open to the public. There are several miles of trails on the reserve. These multi-use trails range in various levels of difficulty. There are bathrooms and picnic areas at the trail heads. A historical stagecoach stop was located at Pigeon Pass near the spring. There are suggestions of grinding rocks (morteros or metates) in the area which would indicate past use by indigenous peoples. The area was used by the late-Prehistoric Cahuilla and Luiseño people. The presence of the perennial cold springs at Box Springs Canyon encouraged use of the area during prehistoric times, as a cupule rock and 24 grinding rock stations have been found nearby.

== See also ==
- Box Springs Mountain
- University of California Citrus Experiment Station
