= University of Louisville basketball scandal =

University of Louisville basketball scandal could refer to:

- 1956 recruiting violations that led to a two-year probation and ban on post-season play, as discussed in the Louisville Cardinals men's basketball article
- 2015 University of Louisville basketball sex scandal
- 2017 NCAA Division I men's basketball corruption scandal, in which Louisville was one of the universities involved
