= Valley View High School (Moreno Valley, California) =

Public high school in California, United States

Coordinates: 33°55′47″N 116°11′40″W

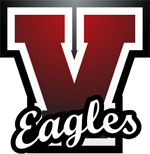
- 13135 Nason St. Moreno Valley, California 92555; United States

Information
- Type: Public
- Motto: Eagles soar with excellence, lead with dignity and pursue with a purpose
- Established: 1980
- School district: Moreno Valley Unified School District
- Principal: Christopher Gilliatt
- Teaching staff: 123.46 (FTE)
- Grades: 9–12
- Enrollment: 2,784 (2023–2024)
- Student to teacher ratio: 22.55
- Campus size: 34.5 acres (0.0539 mi^{2}; 0.140 km^{2})
- Colors: Red, white, and black
- Athletics: valleyviewathletics.net
- Nickname: Eagles
- Website: valleyview.mvusd.net

Valley View High School is a public high school located in Moreno Valley, California and is part of the Moreno Valley Unified School District. The official school colors are red, white, and black. The school's mascots are the Eagles.

It is the Performing Arts Magnet for the district, a department which includes band, theater, choir, and dance. Other activities include sports teams such as soccer, swimming, football, volleyball, basketball, golf, tennis, cheer, wrestling, track and field, cross country and clubs including Anime Club, Esports, Art Club, Eco Club, National Honor Society, among others. One attraction to Valley View is VVHS's Journalism/Advanced Journalism class, which was started when the school first opened. The class is run by Jaqueline Caza, who became the yearbook advisor in 2016. It is also a Yearbook class and gives the students many applicable life skills.

== Crimson Regiment Band and Guard ==
The Crimson Regiment marching band has made notable achievements in the past, such as: placing 3rd in the 1999 WBA Championships in the 5A (the highest class) and taking Sweepstakes in both the parade and field show competition at the 2000 Tostitos Fiesta Bowl. The program underwent changes after the 1999–2000 season. The Crimson Regiment also performed at 2004 Nokia Sugar Bowl. The Crimson Regiment won the title of AAA Champions in the WBA circuit in 2004.

== Notable alumni ==
- Ryan Madson, Major League Baseball pitcher
- Davetta Sherwood, actress and musician
- Kyle Turley, former professional football player
- Derrick Ward, former professional football player
- Marcus Slaughter, professional basketball player
- Steven Wright, professional baseball player
- Zak Knutson, actor, director, producer
- Willie James, Pro baseball athlete, actor and pro baseball trainer
- Sabrina Enciso, professional soccer player
