= Sumaya Kazi =

American entrepreneur (born 1982)

Sumaya Kazi সুমাইয়া কাজী
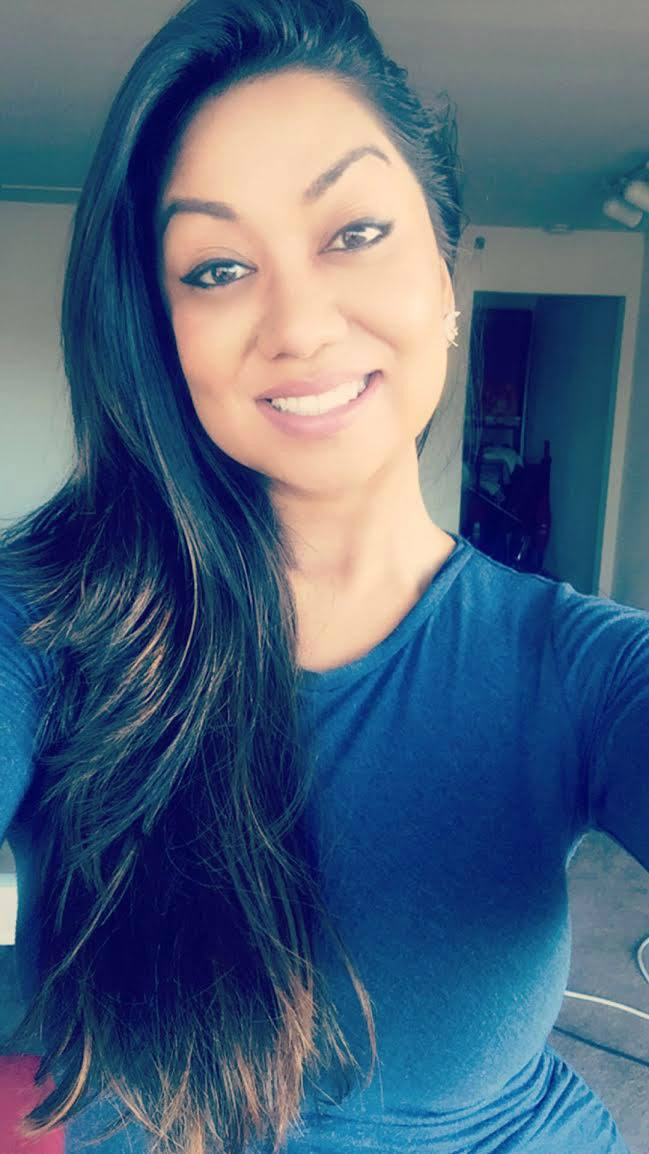
- Born: July 17, 1982 (age 44); Moreno Valley, California, US
- Education: University of California, Berkeley
- Occupation: Entrepreneur
- Website: SumayaKazi.com

Sumaya Kazi (Bengali: সুমাইয়া কাজী, born July 17, 1982) is an American entrepreneur. At the age of 23, Kazi founded her first company The CulturalConnect. She later founded and was the CEO of San Francisco-based technology company Sumazi, a social intelligence platform used by brands, celebrities and enterprises. Kazi held one of the first social media management positions at a Fortune 500 company leading social media at Sun Microsystems until its acquisition by Oracle.

== Early life ==
Kazi was born in Hollywood, California in 1982 and grew up in Moreno Valley, California. She started taking college courses at Riverside Community College at the age of 11, advancing in mathematics while attending Landmark Middle School.

Kazi attended Canyon Springs High School, where she was voted "Most Likely to Succeed" by her senior class. At the age of 16, she won the title of Miss Inland Empire (California) and later was a top five finalist in the California Distinguished Young Women competition, winning her a scholarship toward college.

She attended the University of California, Berkeley graduating in 2004 with a degree in Interdisciplinary Studies in Business. While a student, Kazi worked at the University Human Rights Centers on campus under the leadership of Professor Eric Stover, transcribing interviews of war-torn victims from Bosnia and Croatia. Kazi, along with her team, won first place in the Haas School of Business Cisco & Deloitte E-Business case competition, which served as a catalyst for her career in technology.

== Career ==
Upon graduation, Kazi worked at Sun Microsystems where she was the senior social media manager for the Global Communications division. Kazi, one of the first social media managers at a Fortune 500 company, was responsible for developing programs to capture, expand and socialize new and evolving media, analyst and influencer communities.

While working at Sun Microsystems, at the age of 23, Kazi founded her first company The CulturalConnect, an online media company for young professionals aimed at redefining what success looks like in different ethnic diasporas. The CulturalConnect was made up of five online publications including: The DesiConnect, The MidEastConnect, The AsiaConnect, The AfricanaConnect, and The LatinConnect.

In April 2011, Sumaya founded Sumazi, the social intelligence platform used by brands, celebrities and enterprises. Sumazi was a finalist at the TechCrunch Disrupt Startup Battlefield, where it won the Omidyar Network award for "Startup Most Likely to Change the World."

== Awards, press and honors ==
- 2006: BusinessWeek Magazine, America's Best Young Entrepreneurs Under 25
- 2007: CNN, Young People Who Rock
- 2007: Brass Magazine cover story
- 2007: Silicon Valley Business Journal, Dynamic Super Connector
- 2008: ABC7 KGO-TV, Bay Area Trailblazer and Community Leader
- 2009: UTNE Reader, Top 50 Visionaries Who Are Changing Your World
- 2011: GenJuice, The Top 100 Most Desirable Mentors
- 2012: YFS Magazine, 10 San Francisco Entrepreneurs to Watch
- 2012: Forbes, Female Founders to Watch from UC Berkeley
- 2012: Reuters, Most Influential Executives on the Web
- 2014: British Bangladeshi Power & Inspiration 100, Top 10 Inspirational Bangladeshis Around the World

== Public speaking ==
Kazi is a frequent speaker and panelist at technology conferences and educational institutions educating audiences on topics such as entrepreneurship, non-profit work, intrapreneurship, social entrepreneurship, young professional issues, social media, diversity and technology. She has presented at the World Islamic Economic Forum in Malaysia, Marketing 2.0 Conference in France, BlogWorld Expo in Las Vegas, National Society of Collegiate Scholars Conference in Florida, Google Girl Geek Dinners Panel in Mountain View, Congresswoman Jackie Speier's Job Hunter's Conference in San Mateo among many other speaking engagements. Additionally, Kazi has been a speaker at several TEDx conferences including TEDxYouth at Facebook, TEDxBayArea at Linkedin, and TEDxWomen.

== Personal life ==
Kazi has practiced an Intermittent Fasting lifestyle since 2015. She has written a popular how-to guide on her Intermittent Fasting schedule and how she lost over 55 pounds as a result. She has been interviewed by Quartz Magazine, HVMN, and Inc Magazine about her success with Intermittent Fasting.

Kazi is a Salsa and Bachata dancer. She was a competitive Salsa dancer with the RicaSalsa San Francisco-based dance troupe where they won 1st place at the United States Salsa Open Championships in the Amateur category.
