= 2015 University of Louisville basketball sex scandal =

American college basketball scandal

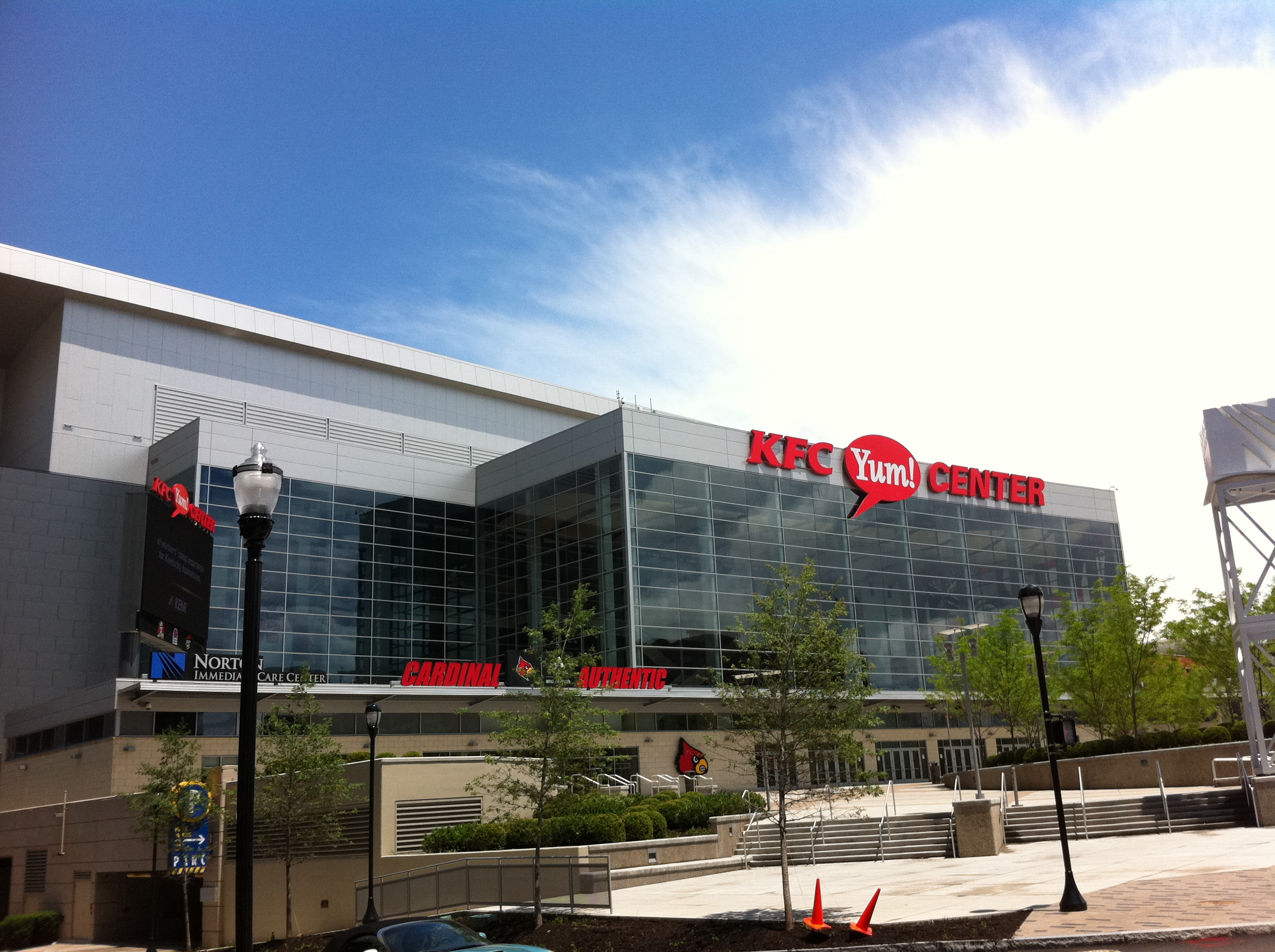
KFC Yum! Center is the home of Louisville Cardinals men's basketball.

The 2015 University of Louisville basketball sex scandal involved National Collegiate Athletic Association (NCAA) rules violations committed by the University of Louisville men's basketball program.

The scandal centered around improper benefits given by Andre McGee, a former Louisville player who was then serving as Director of Basketball Operations, to prospective players and former Louisville players. An investigation of the program was joined by the NCAA and the FBI. As a result of the investigation, Louisville's basketball program was punished with sanctions.

== Katina Powell ==
In October 2015, Yahoo! Sports reported that the University of Louisville was investigating allegations made by Katina Powell, who described herself as a madam. Powell alleged that she had been paid several thousand dollars from 2010 to 2014 to provide women to dance for and have sex with Cardinals players and recruits. Many of the alleged parties took place at Minardi Hall, the men's basketball dormitory; others took place at off-campus locations. The allegations came out in advance of the release of Breaking Cardinal Rules: Basketball and the Escort Queen, a book written by Powell and Indianapolis-based investigative journalist Dick Cady. In the book, Powell named Andre McGee, a former Cardinals assistant who was the team's director of operations in 2015, as having paid her for these services.

== Andre McGee ==
McGee graduated from Canyon Springs High School in Moreno Valley, California, in 2005. That fall, he enrolled at Louisville, where he played for the Cardinals for four seasons. He helped the 2007–08 Cardinals reach the Elite Eight in the 2008 NCAA tournament. As the starting point guard during his senior year, he led the 2008–09 Cardinals to the Big East regular season and Big East tournament championships. The team earned the No. 1 overall seed in the 2009 NCAA tournament and again advanced to the Elite Eight. He played in 127 career games, including 57 starts, while averaging 5.2 points per game for the Cardinals.

After his playing career at Louisville, McGee played briefly in the Basketball Bundesliga in Germany. He then served as a program assistant and Director of Basketball Operations under head coach Rick Pitino from 2010 to 2014. It was during this time that McGee committed NCAA violations by acquiring and paying for striptease dances and sexual acts for prospective players and players on his current roster. The violations occurred from December 2010 until June 2014.

== Findings ==
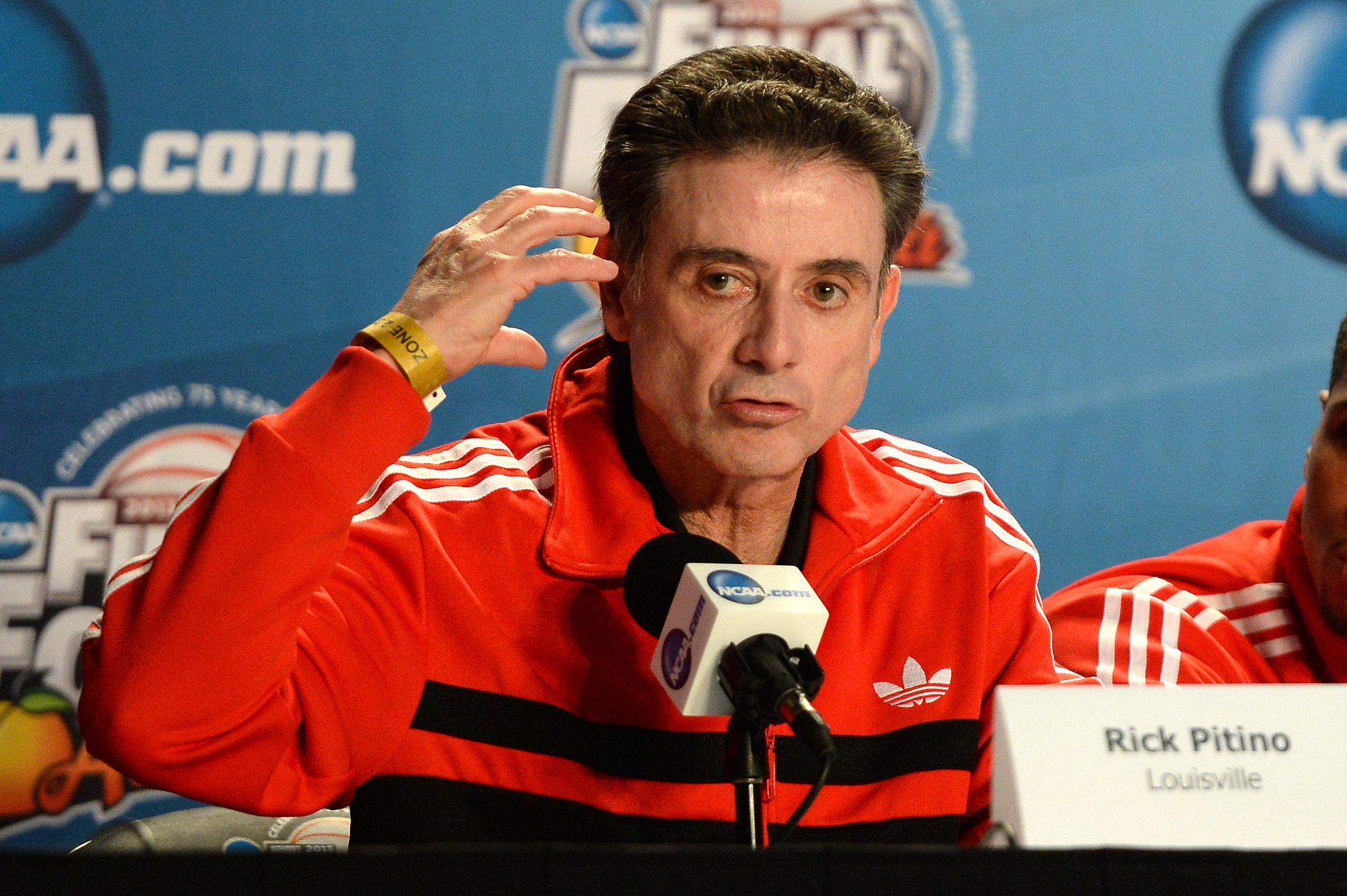
Rick Pitino in 2013

The NCAA found Pitino guilty of a Level I charge. NCAA bylaws 11.1.2.1 and 11.1.1.1 require the head coach to monitor all recruiting activities to ensure that they are complied with. Pitino failed to monitor that his director of basketball operations, McGee, complied with NCAA rules when Pitino gave McGee recruiting responsibilities.

The NCAA found that McGee engaged in unethical conduct and failed to cooperate when he refused to participate in interviews or provide relevant information to the enforcement staff during the investigation, which constituted violations of NCAA bylaws 10.01.1, 10.1, 19.2.3, and 10.1-(a).

== Penalties ==
Pitino was set to be suspended for the first five games of the 2017–18 season, (Note: Louisville competed in basketball in the Big East Conference for the 2005–06 through 2012–13 seasons, in the American Athletic Conference during the 2013–14 season, and then joined the Atlantic Coast Conference starting with the 2014–15 season.) but Louisville fired him in October 2017, before the season started.

The program also had 123 wins from December 2010 to April 2014 vacated, including the 2012 Final Four and the 2013 national championship. The Cardinals were the first to have a men's basketball national title vacated by the NCAA. They also faced a monetary fine for revenue the university made from advertisements during the Final Fours and National Championship.

The university filed an appeal, but the NCAA upheld the findings and punishments on February 20, 2018, subsequently declaring no official result of the 2013 NCAA tournament, and thus no official winner of the national championship.

On September 30, 2019, a group of players on the 2012–13 Cardinals team who were not involved in the rules violations settled a lawsuit they had filed against the NCAA. Most of the settlement was confidential, but one portion was authorized to be revealed—while Louisville's team records (including the national title) remained vacated, all honors and statistics for these players were restored. Luke Hancock, a plaintiff in the suit, was once again officially recognized as the Most Outstanding Player of the 2013 Final Four.

== See also ==
- University of Michigan basketball scandal
- University of Southern California athletics scandal
- Ohio State University football scandal
- University of Minnesota basketball scandal
