= Mark Contreras =

American baseball player (born 1995)

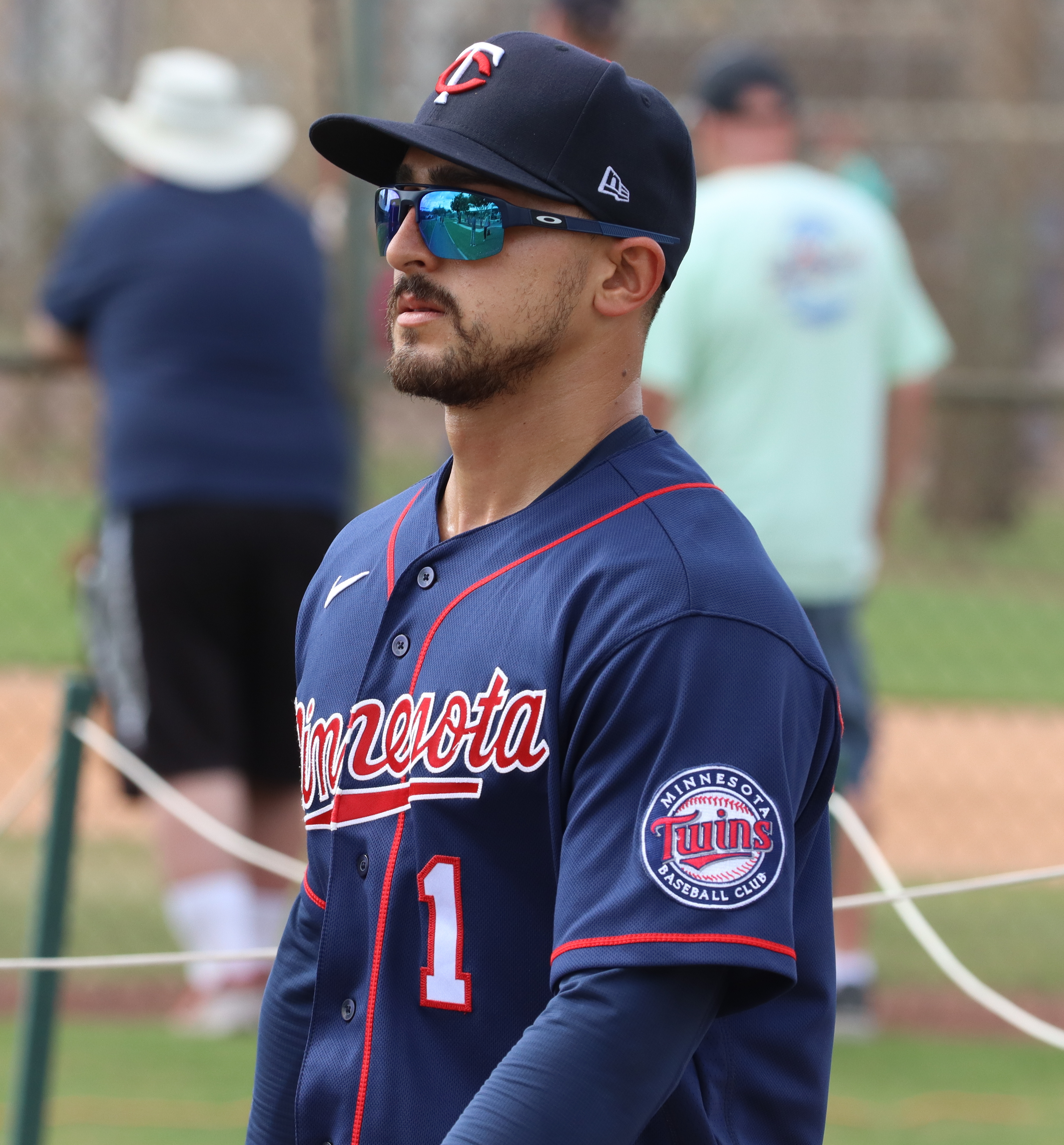
- Contreras with the Minnesota Twins

Dorados de Chihuahua – No. 8
- Outfielder
- Born: January 24, 1995 (age 31); Moreno Valley, California, U.S.
- Bats: Left Throws: Right

MLB debut
- May 11, 2022, for the Minnesota Twins

MLB statistics (through 2022 season)
- Batting average: .121
- Home runs: 3
- Runs batted in: 6
- Stats at Baseball Reference

Teams
- Minnesota Twins (2022)

Mark Anthony Contreras (born January 24, 1995) is an American professional baseball outfielder for the Dorados de Chihuahua of the Mexican League. Contreras played college baseball at the University of California, Riverside. He has previously played in Major League Baseball (MLB) for the Minnesota Twins.

== Early life and amateur career ==
Contreras grew up in Moreno Valley, California and attended Canyon Springs High School. He was a member of the varsity baseball team and won four consecutive Inland Valley League championships with the team.

Contreras attended the University of California, Riverside, and played college baseball for the UC Riverside Highlanders for four seasons. He was named second team All-Big West Conference after batting .332 with 14 doubles. As a senior Contreras led the team with a .366 batting average and a .427 on-base percentage and was named first-team All-Big West.

== Professional career ==
=== Minnesota Twins ===
The Minnesota Twins selected Contreras in the ninth round of the 2017 Major League Baseball draft. He was assigned to the Fort Myers Miracle at the beginning of the 2019 season and was promoted to the Double-A Pensacola Blue Wahoos and was named a minor league Gold Glove award winner at the end of the year. He did not play in a game in 2020 due to the cancellation of the minor league season because of the COVID-19 pandemic. Contreras began the 2021 season with the Double-A Wichita Wind Surge, where he played 19 games before being promoted to the Triple-A St. Paul Saints.

The Twins promoted Contreras to their major league roster on May 10, 2022. He made his major league debut on May 11, entering the game as a defensive replacement for Byron Buxton after play resumed following a rain delay. On August 2, Contreras hit his first career home run, a solo shot off of Detroit Tigers pitcher Matt Manning. Contreras played in 28 games for the Twins in 2022 and slashed .121/.148/.293 with three home runs and six RBIs.

On December 20, 2022, the Twins designated Contreras for assignment to make room on the 40-man roster for Joey Gallo. He cleared waivers and was sent outright to Triple–A St. Paul on January 3. In 90 games for St. Paul, he batted .274/.352/.418 with 10 home runs, 54 RBI, and 23 stolen bases. On August 3, 2023, Contreras was released by the Twins organization.

=== Boston Red Sox ===
On November 11, 2023, Contreras signed a minor league contract with the Boston Red Sox organization. He was named a non-roster invitee to the team's spring training. Contreras spent the 2024 campaign with the Triple-A Worcester Red Sox, playing in 104 contests and batting .199/.312/.311 with five home runs, 35 RBI, and 25 stolen bases. He elected free agency following the season on November 4, 2024.

=== Staten Island FerryHawks ===
On April 25, 2025, Contreras signed with the Staten Island FerryHawks of the Atlantic League of Professional Baseball. He made 117 appearances for Staten Island, batting .288/.382/.483 with 18 home runs, 94 RBI, and 14 stolen bases. Following the season, Contreras was named to the ALPB All-Defensive team. He became a free agent following the season.

=== Dorados de Chihuahua ===
On March 10, 2026, Contreras signed with the Dorados de Chihuahua of the Mexican League.
