= MVL =

MVL may refer to:

== Businesses and corporations ==
- Marvel Entertainment; New York Stock Exchange symbol MVL
- Melville Corporation; former New York Stock Exchange symbol MVL
- Mvelaphanda Resources Limited; JSE Securities Exchange symbol MVL

== Mathematics, science and technology ==
- Man Vehicle Laboratory, a research group at the Massachusetts Institute of Technology
- Mercury-vapor lamp, a type of gas-discharge lamp
- Multi-valued logic, a propositional calculus with more than two truth values

== People ==
- Mario Vargas Llosa (1936-2025), Peruvian-Spanish writer
- Maxime Vachier-Lagrave (born 1990), French chess grandmaster

== Sports ==
- Miami Valley League, Ohio, United States
- Mountain Valley League, a high school athletic league in California, United States

== Transport ==
- Malavli railway station, India; Indian Railways station code MVL
- Malvern Link railway station, England; National Rail station code MVL
- Mavial Magadan Airlines; ICAO airline code MVL
- Morrisville-Stowe State Airport, Vermont, United States; IATA airport code MVL

== Other uses ==
- Members voluntary liquidation, a type of company liquidation
- Minnesota Valley Lutheran High School, a private Lutheran high school in New Ulm, Minnesota
