= Vista del Lago High School =

Vista del Lago High School may refer to:

- Vista del Lago High School (Folsom, California)
- Vista del Lago High School (Moreno Valley, California)
