= Kyle Turley =

American football player (born 1975)

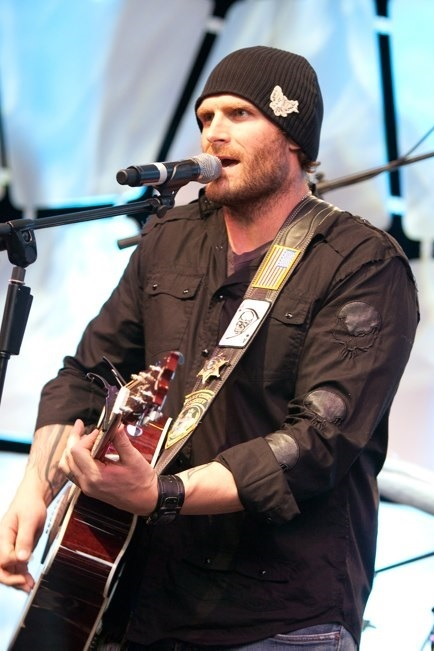
- Turley in 2010

No. 68, 74
- Position: Offensive tackle

Personal information
- Born: September 24, 1975 (age 51); Provo, Utah, U.S.
- Listed height: 6 ft 5 in (1.96 m)
- Listed weight: 309 lb (140 kg)

Career information
- High school: Valley View (Moreno Valley, California)
- College: San Diego State
- NFL draft: 1998: 1st round, 7th overall pick

Career history
- New Orleans Saints (1998–2002); St. Louis Rams (2003–2004); Kansas City Chiefs (2006–2007)

Awards and highlights
- First-team All-Pro (2000); Second-team All-Pro (2003); PFWA All-Rookie Team (1998); Consensus All-American (1997)

Career NFL statistics
- Games played: 109
- Games started: 107
- Fumble recoveries: 8
- Stats at Pro Football Reference

Kyle John Turley (born September 24, 1975) is an American former professional football player who was an offensive tackle for nine seasons in the National Football League (NFL). He played college football for the San Diego State Aztecs and was selected seventh overall in the 1998 NFL draft. Turley played five seasons for the New Orleans Saints and a year with the St. Louis Rams before a serious back injury sidelined him for the 2004 and 2005 seasons. He returned to football in 2006 as a member of the Kansas City Chiefs, where he spent the last two years of his career before announcing his retirement in December 2007. Turley's high level of play earned him All-Pro honors for the 2000 season and a Pro Bowl invite following the 2001 season. His career is best remembered by many for a 2001 incident in which he ripped off an opposing player's helmet and tossed it downfield, playing a key factor in his team losing the game but also earning the respect of many Saints fans for his defense of the quarterback.

Following his retirement from football, Turley set out on a music career that included the release of several albums and the launch of his own record label. Playing his "power country" style of music, Turley opened for a number of well-known musical acts, including in 2010 when he went on tour with Hank Williams III. Turley has also been outspoken and involved in a number of player health issues post-retirement, particularly in regard to the neurological problems resulting from his football career (early onset Alzheimer's, CTE symptomatic, seizures, vertigo) and his use of cannabis as treatment. Turley is a board member and active supporter of the Gridiron Greats Assistance Fund, an organization providing medical care and other forms of assistance to retired NFL players in dire need.

== Early life ==
Turley was born in Provo, Utah. He lived in Utah as well as the state of Washington before moving to southern California at the age of 10. Growing up Turley enjoyed surfing and skateboarding, and took an interest in music.

Turley attended Valley View High School in Moreno Valley, California. He played defensive end during his only season of football as a senior in 1992, earning first-team all-league honors and attracting athletic scholarship offers from several universities seeking to recruit him. Turley also played baseball and was recognized with all-state honors as a wrestler.

== College career ==
Turley played college football at San Diego State University, redshirting his first year in 1993. During his time on the scout team he practiced on both the offensive and defensive line, and was given the choice afterwards of where he wanted to play. Turley chose offensive line as it allowed him the opportunity to work with O-line coach Ed White, a 17-year veteran of the NFL who played in four Super Bowls. Turley's most notable achievements came his final season in 1997, earning first-team All-American honors and being named a semifinalist for the Lombardi Award and Outland Trophy. He was also twice named All-Western Athletic Conference first-team during his time at SDSU. Turley was inducted into the Aztec Hall of Fame in 2011.

== Professional career ==
Pre-draft measurables
Height	Weight	Arm length	Hand span	40-yard dash	10-yard split	20-yard split	20-yard shuttle	Vertical jump	Broad jump	Bench press
6 ft 4 7/8 in (1.95 m)	309 lb (140 kg)	35 1/8 in (0.89 m)	9 1/2 in (0.24 m)	4.95 s	1.71 s	2.89 s	4.43 s	32.0 in (0.81 m)	9 ft 4 in (2.84 m)	26 reps

=== New Orleans Saints ===
Turley was selected in the first round with the seventh overall pick by the New Orleans Saints in the 1998 NFL draft. Initially not projected as a high first round pick, Turley's draft stock rose dramatically after turning in a stellar 4.93 seconds for the 40-yard dash at the NFL Combine. Turley's performance caught the eye of then-Saints coach Mike Ditka, and the team subsequently made him the first offensive linemen selected in the 1998 draft. He signed a six-year contract on July 24, 1998.

Turley played a total of five seasons for the Saints, making an immediate impact by starting 15 games his rookie season and earning all-rookie honors from Pro Football Weekly, Football News, and Football Digest. A durable presence on the Saints offensive line, Turley missed only one game due to ankle injury during his five years in New Orleans. Turley would prove to be a versatile player as well, starting mostly at left guard his rookie season, then moving to right tackle the next three seasons, and over to left tackle in 2002. His strong play earned him first-team All-Pro honors following the 2000 season and an invitation to the Pro Bowl as a substitute following the 2001 season. He would turn down the Pro Bowl invite to serve as grand marshall of the Endymion Parade during Mardi Gras, however.

During his time in New Orleans, Turley became a fan favorite for his spirited style of play and colorful personality. His popularity especially took off after the helmet tossing incident of 2001, with many Saints fans lining up to buy his jersey afterwards. Turley's antics were less well-received among team management however, particularly leading up to his March 2003 trade when Turley engaged in a public dispute with general manager Mickey Loomis. Amongst players in the league, Turley came to be known by some as a dirty player due to his frequent use of cut blocks and ambushing of unsuspecting defenders. Turley defended his use of the cut block, noting that it is a legal maneuver and that he is simply doing his job within the rules of the game.

Turley's football career is best remembered by many for an on-field altercation that occurred in a game against the New York Jets on November 4, 2001. Trailing 16–9 in the final minute of the game, the Saints were driving deep into opposition territory with the ball at the 6-yard line on second-and-3. After quarterback Aaron Brooks was tackled on a scramble to the 5-yard line, Jets safety Damien Robinson grabbed him by the facemask and bent his body backwards while twisting his head to the side. Turley stepped in and separated the two, then picked up Robinson by the facemask and threw him to the ground as referees and players from both teams tried to break up the scrum. Turley emerged from the pile with Robinson's helmet in hand and flung it across the field before making an obscene gesture. Robinson and Turley received offsetting personal fouls for the initial incident, but Turley was assessed an additional personal foul and ejected from the game for the helmet toss and obscene gesture. The penalty set the Saints back 15 yards and they ended up losing the game after failing to score on the drive. Saints head coach Jim Haslett said he initially considered cutting Turley before seeing a clearer view of the incident on film and discussing it with quarterback Aaron Brooks, who thought his neck had been broken at the time. Turley was subsequently fined $25,000 by the Saints organization and requested to attend counseling for management of anger issues. Many Saints fans applauded Turley's actions on the other hand, setting up a "Kyle Turley Defense Fund" to assist in payment of the fine and putting up "Turley for mayor" signs around the city. The incident occurred during a nationally televised game and received a significant amount of media attention afterwards, putting Turley's name in the national spotlight for the first time.

=== St. Louis Rams ===
Turley was traded to the St. Louis Rams on March 21, 2003, in exchange for a 2nd round pick in the 2004 draft. He was immediately signed to a 5-year, $26.5 million extension (in addition to the one year remaining on his contract), making Turley the fourth-highest paid offensive lineman in the league. With future hall-of-famer Orlando Pace already entrenched at the starting left tackle position, Turley moved to the right side and started all 16 regular games plus the single playoff game of the Rams 2003 season. During week 7, Turley suffered a severe concussion after taking a knee to the back of the head, but he was cleared for practice by mid-week and started the next game (as Turley would later attest in a January 2010 congressional hearing on the NFL's handling of concussions). In December 2003, Turley was featured on the cover of Sports Illustrated.

Turley underwent surgery to repair a herniated disc in March 2004. He re-aggravated the injury during training camp and was placed on injured reserve on August 28, ending his season. Turley ruled out a second surgery on his back and opted for a long rehabilitation instead, during which his weight dropped to 235 pounds from a normal playing weight of 310. In December, he was involved in a heated exchange regarding the matter with head coach Mike Martz, after which Martz filed a complaint with NFL security. No disciplinary action was taken as a result, but Turley admitted that hard feelings lingered. Turley also harbored feelings of resentment leading up to the incident, believing that the organization acted recklessly and carelessly in pushing him to return from back surgery too soon and advising him to play through initial onset of the injury during the 2003 season. During his continued rehabilitation in 2005, Turley suggested he may switch to the defensive end position to lessen the load on his back. He was released by the Rams on June 6, 2005, however, after failing a physical. He ended up spending the entire 2004 and 2005 seasons out of football, continuing his recovery and training for a return in 2006.

=== Kansas City Chiefs ===
After a mini-camp tryout at tight end for the Miami Dolphins, Turley signed a two-year contract with the Kansas City Chiefs on June 13, 2006, where he would compete for a starting job at the right tackle position. He started the first two games of the season, but recurring back problems and a shoulder injury late in the season ended up limiting him to 7 starts in 7 games played. He was also overpowered at times on the field due to playing below his normal weight from before his 2004 back surgery.

Turley was released by the Chiefs in March 2007, but re-signed to a new one-year contract on July 26, 2007. Having regained most of his normal playing weight in the offseason, Turley reported to training camp at 300 pounds. Turley's health would again be an issue during the season, however, as he dealt with hamstring, ankle, and back problems. He started 5 of 7 games played in and ended the season on injured reserve. Turley announced his retirement from football on December 21, 2007.

== Life after football ==
=== Music career ===
==== Early years ====
Turley's passion for music began early in life, taking up the guitar at age 14. He listened to punk, grunge, and metal growing up as a teenager in southern California, and was also exposed heavily to country music from being around his father. During his football career Turley played in a number of bands in the offseason, including various cover bands and a death metal band named Perpetual Death Mode. He also jammed with other NFL players, and learned to play bass and drums. While living in New Orleans, Turley immersed himself heavily in the local music scene where he befriended a number of musicians, including Phil Anselmo from Pantera. Turley continued networking and honing his musical abilities in St. Louis, jamming with local musicians and performing at a number of charity events.

==== The Kyle Turley Band ====
A year after retiring from football, Turley moved to Nashville where he set his sights on pursuing a music career. He formed The Kyle Turley Band and released his first album, a 4-track self-titled EP, in 2009. His first full-length album, Anger Management, was released in 2010 and included all songs from the earlier EP. The album sold over 10,000 copies and reached as high as No. 69 and 17 on the iTunes and AmazonMP3 country charts respectively, while also charting at No. 8 on Billboard's Heatseekers South Central chart. His next album, a 6-song EP titled Death, Drugs & the DoubleCross, came out in 2011 and became the top selling album in New Orleans, as well as reaching #1 on Billboard's Heatseekers South Central chart and #28 on the Heatseekers chart overall. Turley's second full-length album Skull Shaker was released in 2013.

Turley sings and plays guitar for The Kyle Turley Band. He describes his style of music as "power country", drawing influences from old-school country, heavy metal, Southern rock, and punk rock. Some of Turley's song lyrics make reference to his football career, including the tracks "Flyin' Helmets" and "Anger Management" which allude to Turley's helmet tossing incident. The song "My Soul Bleeds Black and Gold" is a tribute to the city of New Orleans and its football team, which in the years since his 2003 departure Turley has expressed regret for leaving.

Turley has toured extensively with his band, including in spring 2010 when he hit the road with Hank Williams III across the western United States. Other acts that Turley has opened for include Lynyrd Skynyrd, Eric Church, Joe Nichols, George Jones, Stephen Cochran, Jake Owen, David Allan Coe, Josh Thompson, and Kansas.

==== Delta Doom ====
Delta Doom is a two-piece doom metal project that Turley formed in 2013 with bassist Rob Ogles from The Kyle Turley Band. Ogles is the band's guitarist while Turley sings and plays drums. Their first album, a 4-track live EP titled Half Alive, was released in December 2013. Delta Doom has toured as an opening act for the New Orleans sludge metal band Crowbar.

==== Gridiron Records ====
Turley launched Gridiron Records in 2006, along with two of his friends Mike Doling (ex-Snot / Soulfly guitarist) and Tim Pickett (of EMI Music). Turley and Pickett are the current owners.

In addition to The Kyle Turley Band and Delta Doom, other acts signed to Gridiron Records include The Hairbrain Scheme, Unset, and Invitro.

=== Health issues and advocacy ===
==== Neurological issues ====
Turley has dealt with a number of neurological health issues since retiring from football in 2007. At age 34 he was diagnosed as symptomatic of chronic traumatic encephalopathy (CTE), and in 2015 he was diagnosed with early onset of Alzheimer's disease. Turley has a seizure disorder, suffering a particularly severe episode in 2009 when he blacked out suddenly followed by several hours of slipping in and out of consciousness while seeking treatment in an emergency room. Turley also experiences bouts of vertigo, a condition that first appeared during his rookie season but which increased in frequency throughout his career and became a daily occurrence in retirement. Other symptoms that Turley has dealt with include depression, anxiety, rage issues, suicidal thoughts, migraine headaches, light sensitivity, and memory problems.

Turley has been active in speaking about his personal experiences dealing with head trauma-related health issues and participating in efforts to reduce risks for current and future players. He testified before Congress in January 2010, giving account of a severe concussion sustained during the 2003 season and the medical care he received afterwards – noting that team doctors cleared his return to the field three days after being released from the hospital. Turley was a plaintiff in a class action lawsuit filed against the NFL seeking medical benefits and compensation for former players suffering from the effects of head trauma, initially resulting in a 2013 settlement of $765 million but later amended to allow for a payout expected to exceed $1 billion. Turley was featured in the 2013 documentary United States of Football examining issues of neurological health in the NFL and youth league football, and has been involved with efforts to educate and assist youth sports programs in head trauma prevention through the Just Cool Me - T.K.O. initiative. Turley has agreed to donate his brain posthumously to the Center for the Study of Traumatic Encephalopathy at Boston University to help advance research in the area of sports-related neurological disorders.

==== Painkiller addiction ====
Turley retired from football with an addiction to pain-killing drugs. He has criticized the manner in which painkillers are dispensed by medical staff in the NFL, stating that pills were handed out to players "like candy" after games. Turley also says team doctors gave him painkillers while concealing the true nature of a serious back injury in 2003, in an effort to keep him on the playing field until season's end. The condition required major surgery in the offseason and eventually led to his release from the Rams, also threatening to end his career at one point. In 2014, Turley was one of more than 500 former players who took part in a class action lawsuit against the NFL alleging similar complaints, also charging that team medical personnel neglected to inform players of the serious health risks of the drugs they were taking.

==== Medical cannabis ====
Turley uses cannabis to treat the neurological issues that he suffers from post-NFL career. He credits cannabis with greatly improving his quality of life and even saving his life, after previously relying on numerous prescription medications with side effects that he says almost drove him to suicide. Turley eliminated his use of pharmaceuticals – including psychiatric and pain-killing drugs – beginning in early 2015 when he went cold turkey and switched to cannabis only. He has been active in speaking about his personal experience using cannabis, and in 2015 founded the Gridiron Cannabis Coalition to help advance policy change regarding the use of cannabis in professional sports. The organization is also involved with medical cannabis research, commencing a study in 2016 to examine the effectiveness of cannabis in treating chronic pain and depression.

In November 2016, Turley was among the signatories of an open letter addressed to the NFL, urging a change in the league's policy towards cannabis. The letter was penned by Doctors for Cannabis Regulation and signed by several other NFL players. Turley is also a member of the Doctors for Cannabis Regulation NFL steering committee.

In January 2017 Turley announced the launch of Neuro Armour (now Neuro XPF), a THC-free cannabis oil that is rich in cannabidiol (CBD) and various terpenes. In March 2020 he opened a cannabis dispensary in Moreno Valley, California, operating under the Shango brand of dispensaries.

Turley received criticism in March 2020 for claiming his CBD products could cure COVID-19 by boosting the immune system. The Food and Drug Administration advised him to cease making such claims on official materials from his CBD business or else he would be subject to legal action. He immediately complied with the request.

==== Gridiron Greats ====
Turley is a board member and active supporter of the Gridiron Greats Assistance Fund, a non-profit 501(c)(3) organization providing medical care and other forms of assistance to retired NFL players in need. Turley first became involved as an active player in 2007 when he pledged one of his game checks to the fund and challenged other players to do the same, many of whom joined in helping to raise several hundred thousand dollars. Announcing his pledge at a November 2007 press conference, Turley spoke of the debilitating football-related health problems and inadequate medical and pension benefits that many retired players face, a topic that had already been the focus of two congressional hearings earlier in the year. Turley became the first active player to publicly take up the cause, also taking NFLPA executive director Gene Upshaw to task at the time for failing to address the issue. After retiring from football, Turley continued to raise funding and awareness for Gridiron Greats through his music career, donating a portion of his album sales and concert revenues to the organization.

Through his involvement with Gridiron Greats, Turley was instrumental in the development of NFL Life Line, a 24/7 confidential crisis hotline for current and former NFL players. Turley conceived of the idea after Junior Seau committed suicide in May 2012.

=== Other ===
After living in Nashville for a number of years, Turley and his family moved to Riverside, California in April 2014, bordering the city of Moreno Valley where Turley grew up and attended high school. Turley has helped instruct the Arlington High School football team in Riverside, and also hosted a football camp at the school.
