= Sumazi =

Social media platform

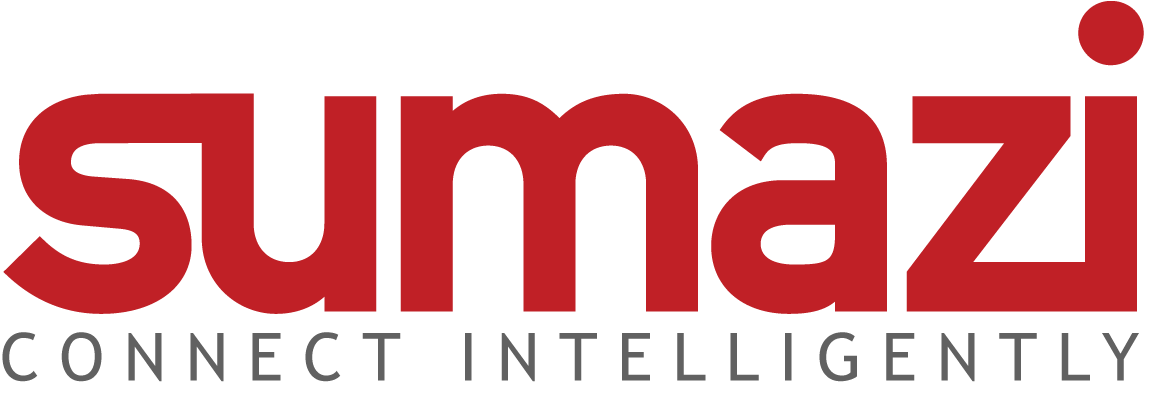
- Available in: English
- Dissolved: 2017
- Owner: Sumaya Kazi
- Website: www.sumazi.com
- Launched: 2014
- Current status: Dead

Sumazi is a social media and social intelligence platform for enterprises, brands, and celebrities. Its technology performs social data analysis across social networking services including Facebook, Twitter and LinkedIn, to identify key people in his/her network who are experts, influencers or are located in a specific area for marketing, advertising or sales campaigns.

The technology company was founded in 2011 by former Sun Microsystems employee Sumaya Kazi. The company was headquartered in San Francisco, California.

The company was out of business by 2017.

== Reception ==
Sumazi was one of 25 startups selected out of more than 1,200 to compete at TechCrunch Disrupt Startup Battlefield, where it won the Omidyar Network award for the startup "Most Likely to Change the World."

Sumazi, which was based out of San Francisco, California, had been profiled in The New York Times as well as USA Today, which commented the advantages of the startup's location in the Silicon Valley. American Express OPEN Forum also featured Sumazi as a "Startup of the Week".
