= Bob Lynn =

American politician (1933–2020)

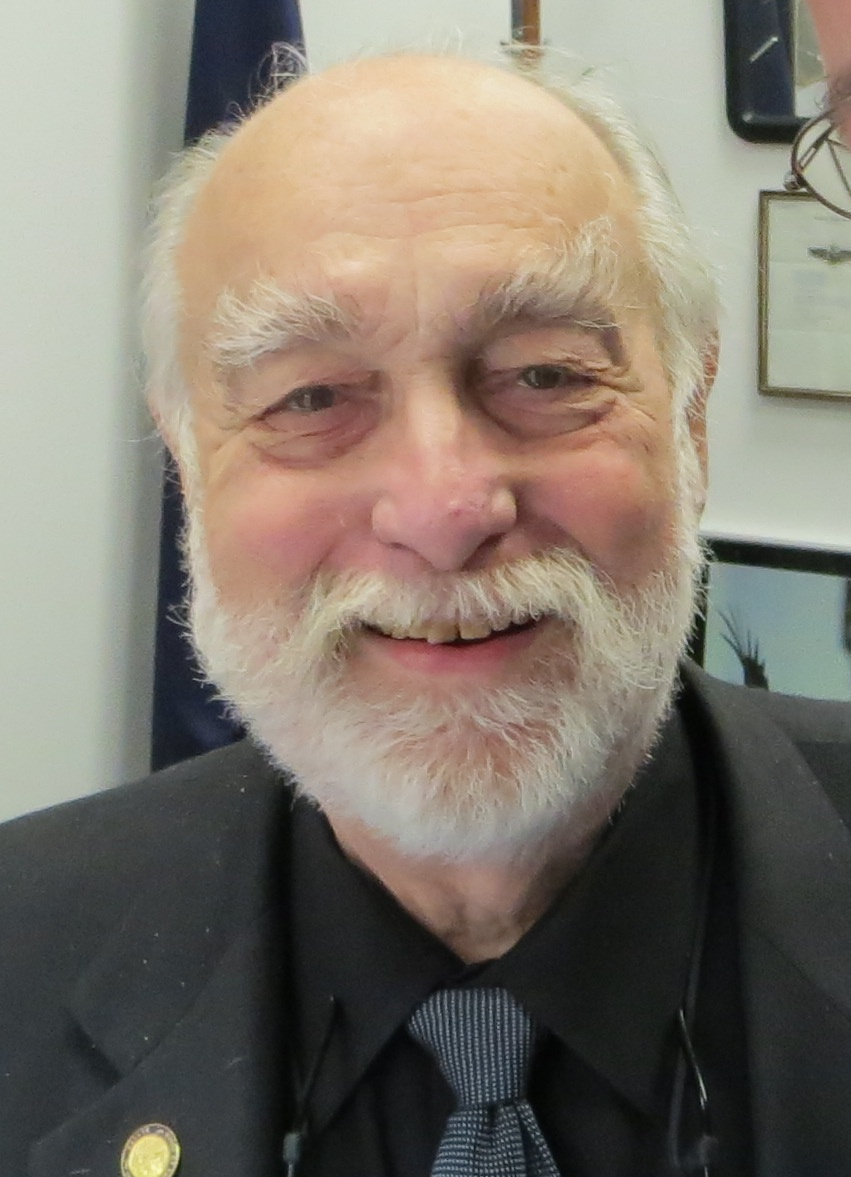

Member of the Alaska House of Representatives from the 26th district
- In office January 19, 2015 – January 14, 2017
- Preceded by: Lora Reinbold
- Succeeded by: Chris Birch

Member of the Alaska House of Representatives from the 23rd district
- In office January 15, 2013 – January 19, 2015
- Preceded by: Les Gara
- Succeeded by: Chris Tuck

Member of the Alaska House of Representatives from the 31st district
- In office January 20, 2003 – January 15, 2013
- Preceded by: Jim Whitaker
- Succeeded by: Cathy Muñoz

Personal details
- Born: February 23, 1933 East Los Angeles, California, US
- Died: May 25, 2020 (aged 87) California, US
- Party: Republican
- Education: University of Arizona, California State University, Long Beach
- Profession: educator, real estate broker

Bob Lynn (February 23, 1933 – May 25, 2020) was an American politician who served as a Republican member of the Alaska House of Representatives, representing the 31st district from 2003 to 2013 and the 26th district from 2013 to 2017. He served as Chair of the State Affairs Committee, was vice-chair of the Judiciary Committee, and was a member of the Transportation Committee and Joint Armed Forces Committees. He also served on the Labor & Workforce Development, Military & Veterans' Affairs, and Public Safety Finance Subcommittees, for the 28th Legislature. Lynn was a retired fighter pilot with the United States Air Force and a Vietnam Veteran.

== Alaska Legislature ==
During the 2011-2012 legislative session, Lynn chaired the State Affairs Committee in the Alaska House.

== Elections ==
- 2012: Lynn won the November 6, 2012, general election with 63% of the vote against Democratic nominee Lupe Marroquin.
- 2014: Lynn won the November 4, 2014, general election with 67% of the vote against Democratic nominee Bill Goodell.
- 2016: Lynn was defeated 59-31% by Chris Birch in the August 15th Republican primary. Birch went on to win the general election.

== Personal life ==
Lynn and his wife Marlene (née Wagner) had six children and twenty-one grandchildren. Lynn was born in East Los Angeles, California, where he graduated from the Garfield High School. He received a Bachelor of Arts from University of Arizona and a Master of Arts from California State University, Long Beach. He was also a graduate of the "Education with Industry" program of the Air University. He served as mayor pro-tem and city councilman of the City of Moreno Valley in Riverside County, California, and was instrumental in the founding of that city in 1984.

He died on May 25, 2020, at age 87. On May 26, 2020, Alaska Governor Mike Dunleavy ordered flags to be flown at half staff on May 27 and May 28 in Lynn's honor.
