= Andre McGee =

American basketball player

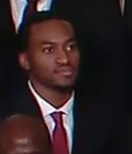

Biographical details
- Born: March 7, 1987 (age 39); Moreno Valley, California, U.S.

Playing career
- 2005–2009: Louisville
- 2009: Phoenix Hagen
- Position: Point guard

Coaching career (HC unless noted)
- 2010–2012: Louisville (GA)
- 2012–2014: Louisville (DBO)
- 2014–2015: UMKC (assistant)

Andre Jerome McGee (born March 7, 1987) is an American former basketball coach and player who was most recently assistant coach at the University of Missouri–Kansas City (UMKC). McGee played college basketball at Louisville under Rick Pitino and one year professionally in Germany before returning to Louisville as an assistant, first a graduate assistant then director of operations.

He resigned as assistant coach on October 23, 2015; he is the figure at the center of the 2015 University of Louisville basketball sex scandal.

== Early life ==
He averaged 22.3 points, 4.2 assists and 3.7 steals per game as a senior at Canyon Springs High School in Moreno Valley, California.

== College career ==
McGee played four seasons with the Louisville Cardinals men's basketball program, from the 2005–06 season through the 2008–09 season. He was the starting point guard during his senior season. He played in 127 career games, including 57 starts, while averaging 5.2 points per game for the Cardinals. The team reached the Elite Eight in both the 2008 and 2009 editions of the NCAA Division I men's basketball tournament.

== Professional playing career ==
McGee played 14 games for Phoenix Hagen of Basketball Bundesliga in Germany before leaving the team in December 2009. He averaged 5.3 points, 1.7 rebounds, and 1.3 assists and shot 35.4%.

== Coaching career ==
McGee returned to Louisville as a graduate assistant on Rick Pitino's staff in 2010. McGee was promoted to director of basketball operations at Louisville in 2012. After the 2013–14 season, he left Louisville to become an assistant at UMKC under former Louisville assistant Kareem Richardson. In the 2015 University of Louisville basketball sex scandal, it was alleged that during the time McGee was employed at Louisville, he procured strippers and prostitutes for some recruits and their fathers at campus parties from 2010 to 2014. Based on this allegation and a corresponding investigation by the NCAA, Louisville voluntarily withdrew from post-season play for the 2015–16 season. The NCAA eventually placed the Cardinals on four years of probation and imposed a 10-year show-cause penalty on McGee, and after a failed appeal, the Cardinals were stripped of their 2013 national title, becoming the first Division I basketball team of either sex to be stripped of a national championship.

== Personal life ==
McGee's family has a history of playing college basketball. His father Anthony McGee played basketball at Long Beach State. His oldest brother, Tony McGee, played at Eastern Washington University and older brother Antoine McGee played at the University of Colorado.

McGee has what was identified in college as sickle cell trait.
