= Inland Valley League =

High school sports league in California, United States

The Inland Valley League is a high school athletic league that is part of the CIF Southern Section. Members are public high schools of Riverside, California and neighboring Moreno Valley.

== Members ==
- Arlington High School
- Canyon Springs High School
- Lakeside High School (Lake Elsinore, California)
- Vista Del Lago High School (Moreno Valley, California)
- Riverside Polytechnic High School
