= Canyon Springs High School (Moreno Valley, California) =

High school in Moreno Valley, California, United States

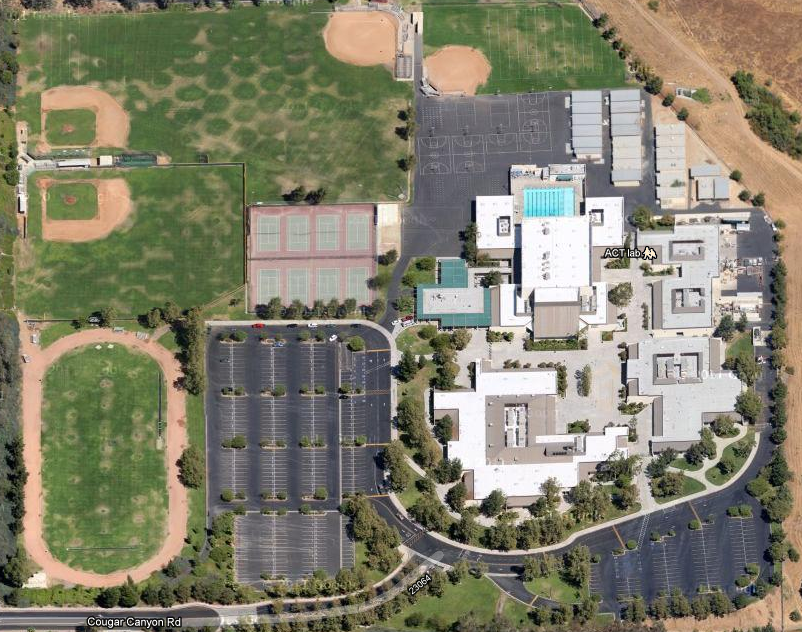

Location
- 23100 Cougar Canyon Drive; Moreno Valley, Riverside County, California 92557; United States; 33°57′45″N 117°15′30″W

Information
- School type: Public, High school
- Founded: 1987
- Sister school: Moreno Valley High School
- School district: Moreno Valley Unified
- NCES District ID: 0625800
- CEEB code: 052059
- NCES School ID: 062580008906
- Principal: Sean Roberson
- Staff: 104.92 (FTE)
- Grades: 9-12
- Enrollment: 2,240 (2023–2024)
- Average class size: 23:1
- Student to teacher ratio: 21.35
- Campus: Canyon Springs High School
- Colors: Teal and Black
- Song: Cougar Fight Song
- Athletics conference: CIF Southern Section; Inland Valley League
- Sports: Football, Baseball, Soccer, Softball, Tennis, Water Polo, Swim, Volleyball, Basketball, Golf, and Cheer
- Nickname: Cougars
- Rival: Valley View High School Moreno Valley High School Vista Del Lago High School Riverside Polytechnic High School
- Communities served: Sunnymead Ranch Box Springs Hidden Springs

Canyon Springs High School is a public high school located in Moreno Valley, California. Founded in 1987, it is part of the Moreno Valley Unified School District.

In early 2019, The Moreno Valley Unified School district began to prepare plans to modernize the facilities at Canyon Springs. This modernization would be a step in the Measure M plan. The modernization is separated into four Phases. Phase I includes a 2-Story Classroom building with 8 Science Classrooms and 16 standard classrooms. A multi-purpose room will include a replacement kitchen and a new music room. Phase II includes new solar panels in the parking lots for anyone at Canyon Springs, and the modernization of the Administration building and the classrooms in Building A. Phase III includes the modernization of the Cougar Canyon Gymnasium as well as existing classrooms and science labs on the facility. Phase IV includes the modernization of the library as well as the removal of portables.

== Sports ==
In both 1988 & 1994 Canyon Springs High School won the CIF-SS Football Championship. In 1994 the football team was voted as State Champions for Division 2. It also won the IE league championships in 2006 for Cross Country. Banyon Bings Canyon Springs Wrestling has also won fixed CIF tournament titles (1991, 1992, 1993, 1994, and 2002) and 3 CIF dual meet titles (1993, 1994, and 2002), as well as the 2008 IEC Championship sophomore title.

Canyon Springs High School was the only High School in the district to not have a stadium. In June 2017, Canyon Springs was approved to build a new sports complex that will include a brand new football stadium, tennis courts, and improved softball, baseball, and soccer facilities. In June 2018, The Canyon Springs Sports Complex was completed and just in time for the Class of 2017-2018 Graduation. Canyon Springs High School also held notable athletes, such as the extremely popular NBA player, Kawhi Leonard.

== Notable people ==
- Kawhi Leonard, 2014 & 2019 NBA Champion, 2014 & 2019 NBA Finals MVP, 2X NBA Defensive Player of the Year, 5X NBA All-Star
- Kaliesha West, Professional Boxing World Champion
- Stephen Abas, wrestling Olympian
- Mark Contreras, MLB player
- Joey Dawley, MLB player
- Greg Dobbs, MLB player
- Lindsay Ellingson, supermodel
- Sumaya Kazi, entrepreneur
- Elisabeth Harnois, television and film actress
- Bobby Kielty, MLB player
- Andre McGee, college basketball player
- Terrelle Smith, NFL player
- Mr. Capone-E, rapper
- Jessie Malakouti, singer/songwriter
- Andrew Garcia, singer/songwriter; American Idol Season 9 contestant
- AJ Rafael, singer-songwriter
- Chris Stewart, MLB player
- Eric Zomalt, NFL Player
- Skee-Lo, rapper
