= Willie James =

American civil rights activist

Reverend Willie R. James Sr. (September 13, 1920 – August 2, 2016) served as an important early civil rights activist in New Jersey starting in late 1950s and helped to end housing discrimination in that state. James later became head of the Burlington County Chapter of the National Association for the Advancement of Colored People and remained active in social issues including fighting poverty, job discrimination and ending the death penalty.

== Biography ==
Willie James was born in Vidalia, Louisiana in 1920. He attended Southern University in Baton Rouge and was drafted in the army in 1941. He served as an officer in the Criminal Investigation Unit. He was transferred to Fort Dix in 1946. While living in New Jersey, he met his future wife Bernice.

James's foray into the Civil Rights Movement happened by coincidence starting in the late 1950s. In 1958, Levitt and Sons started selling homes for their new Levittown project in South Jersey (in what would later become Willingboro Township). When homes for the new Levittown were first being sold, Levitt and Sons had a policy to not sell homes to African-Americans. James however attempted to apply for a Levittown home. In his lawsuit against Levitt and Sons, James stated that on June 29, 1958 an agent of that company told him that the new Levittown development would be an all-white community. Segregation in housing was taken for granted in the late 1950s throughout America. Racial disturbance broke out in Levittown, Pennsylvania when a white family resold their home to African-Americans. However, James was informed by a friend employed at the New Jersey Division of Civil Rights that it was illegal in New Jersey to discriminate in federally subsidized housing. Levittown was receiving mortgage insurance from the Federal Housing Administration. But as of 1958, the law had not been tested.

James sued Levitt and Sons. His suit was tied with another man named Franklin Todd, who was suing Green Fields Farms for housing discrimination against African-Americans as well. James also received help from the NAACP, the League of Women Voters, local Quaker groups and other organizations. James was represented by civil rights attorney, Emerson L. Darnell, who was himself a Quaker. The case received large media attention, because the new Levittown was a model for modern suburbia. The case went as far as the New Jersey Supreme Court which upheld lower court rulings in favor of James. Levitt attempted to have the case heard by the U.S. Supreme Court, but his request was denied. One of the stipulations in the 1960 settlement was that James' home had to be sold to him at the 1958 price. James was not the first African-American to move into Willingboro however. Charles and Vera Williams were the first African-American family to move in 1960 due to the outcome of James' suit against Levitt. James eventually moved into Millbrook Park in 1960 and raised four children there. He would eventually have four sons and three daughters. James later recalled that he moved into his new home on a weekday and that it went smoothly with white neighbors helping him set up curtains.

Following the court case, Levitt prepared an extensive integration policy. Levitt set up an integration committee headed by Howard Lett, an African American. Lett created a five-point program. In order to make a smoother transition, it included the announcement of Levitt's decision to desegregate housing to be made by community leaders. Lett also recommended an attempt to discourage anti-integration activities known as "Operation Hothead".

Another of Lett's ideas was to create a Human Relations Council to oversee possible disputes in the community. James would later serve as a member of that committee. One incident the Council investigated were charges of blockbusting made against several local real estate agents. These agents were accused of intimidating white homeowners with claims that their neighborhood was becoming increasingly African-American and home values could decline. While the Council could not prove these claims, it did outline recommendations to help foster better relations between the diverse populations.

After his momentous victory against Levitt, James became head of the Burlington County Chapter of the NAACP. He headed the NAACP Branch from 1963 to 1974 and remained active in the local Civil Rights Movement. James would clash with Levitt again in 1963 when he and the Congress of Racial Equality staged a demonstration against the developer for refusing to sell homes to African-Americans in Prince George's County, Maryland. James' wife Bernice organized a sit-in with the NAACP in 1966 to desegregate a local recreation area known as Holiday Lake. After retiring from the Army, James became the Director of Equal Employment Operations with IT&T in Paramus, New Jersey. Despite the commute, James kept up his community involvement. He was active in the Kinsmen, an African-American male civic organization based in Willingboro. Working with the NAACP, he conducted a survey of Willingboro Plaza, the town's modern shopping development on Route 130, and found that no African-Americans were employed at the plaza. After negotiations with store owners, several African-Americans were soon employed there. James also filed a complaint against the U.S. Pipe Company in Burlington, New Jersey for maintaining separate shower facilities for African-Americans and failing to hire and promote Blacks. In the 1960s, James also helped to found the Burlington County Community Action Program to help needy residents of the County.

James was transferred by ITT to Providence, Rhode Island in 1974. While living in Rhode Island, he became an ordained minister. He moved back to New Jersey in 1996 and once again became a community activist returning in 1999 to his former position as head of the County's NAACPBranch. He presented a resolution to then-New Jersey Governor Christine Whitman asking her to appoint a special commission to study why a majority of inmates in state prisons were minorities and to place a moratorium on the death penalty in New Jersey. The Governor denied both of those requests. Rev. James also brought the problem of minority incarceration to the attention of the National NAACP Convention. Trying to reduce the minority population in prison became known as the National Project.

In 2001, Willingboro Township renamed the school in Pennypacker Park to W.R. James, Sr. Elementary School in his honor.

He died in Burlington Township on August 2, 2016.
