= Box Springs Mountain =

Mountain in California, United States

- Location within California

Highest point
- Elevation: 3,083 ft (940 m) NAVD 88
- Prominence: 1,160 ft (354 m)
- Coordinates: 33°57′42″N 117°16′49″W

Geography
- Location: Riverside County, California, United States
- Parent range: Box Springs Mountains
- Topo map: USGS Riverside East

Box Springs Mountain is the highest peak in the Box Springs Mountains range, standing 3,083 ft (940 m) tall. The mountain is in northwestern Riverside County, Southern California.

== Geography ==
The mountain is east of downtown Riverside, and northwest of Moreno Valley, a partial border between the two large cities. Most of the mountain is part of the Box Springs Mountain Reserve, a 1,155-acre (4.67 km^{2}) park operated by the county. UC Riverside manages the Box Springs Reserve adjacent to its campus, part of the University of California Natural Reserve System. It protects a transitional ecotone zone between coastal sage scrub and chamise chaparral.

Because the mountain is one of the more prominent features in the Inland Empire (Riverside-San Bernardino urbanized area), the summit is used for numerous telecommunication towers, including transmission towers for the KOLA 99.9 and KGGI 99.1 radio stations.

On a clear day from the top of the west-facing side of the mountain, Riverside, Fontana, Colton, Mount Rubidoux, the eastern range of the Santa Ana mountains, the Pomona valley, Lake Matthews, Ontario, and Rancho Cucamonga are all within range of sight. On rare occasions during atmospheric mirage events, downtown Los Angeles can be partially seen.

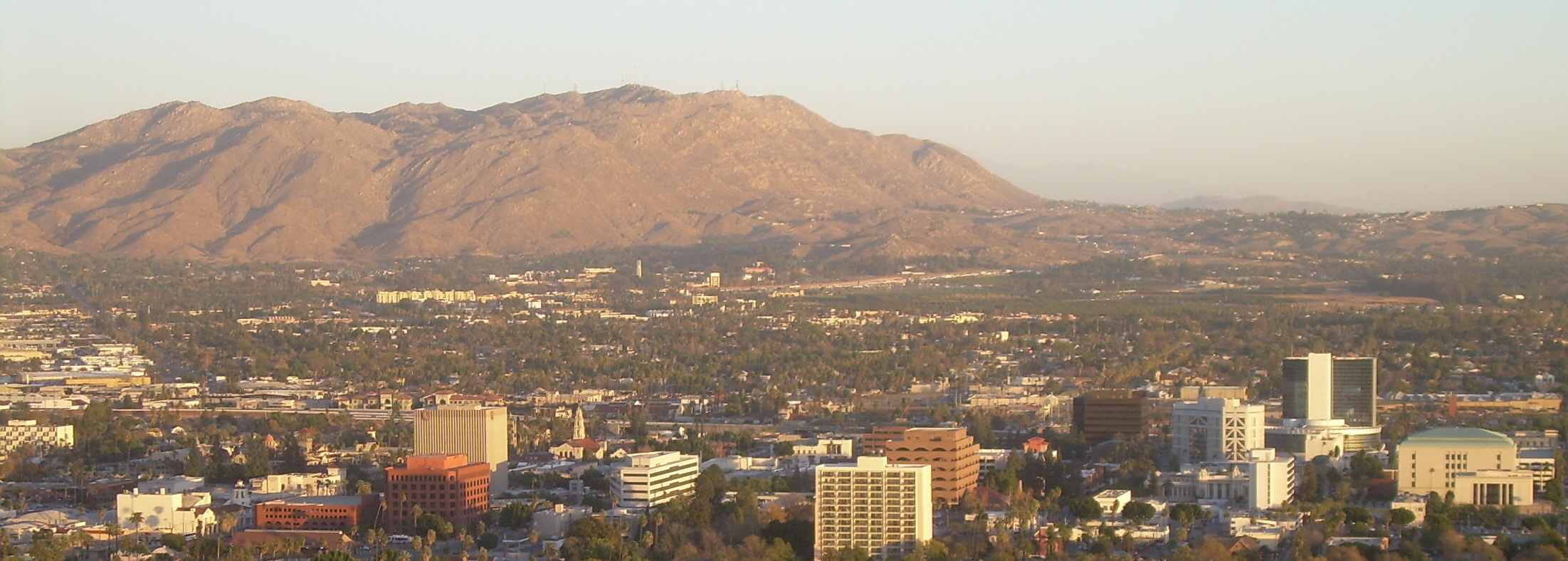
Box Springs Mountains, with Riverside in foreground.

== History ==
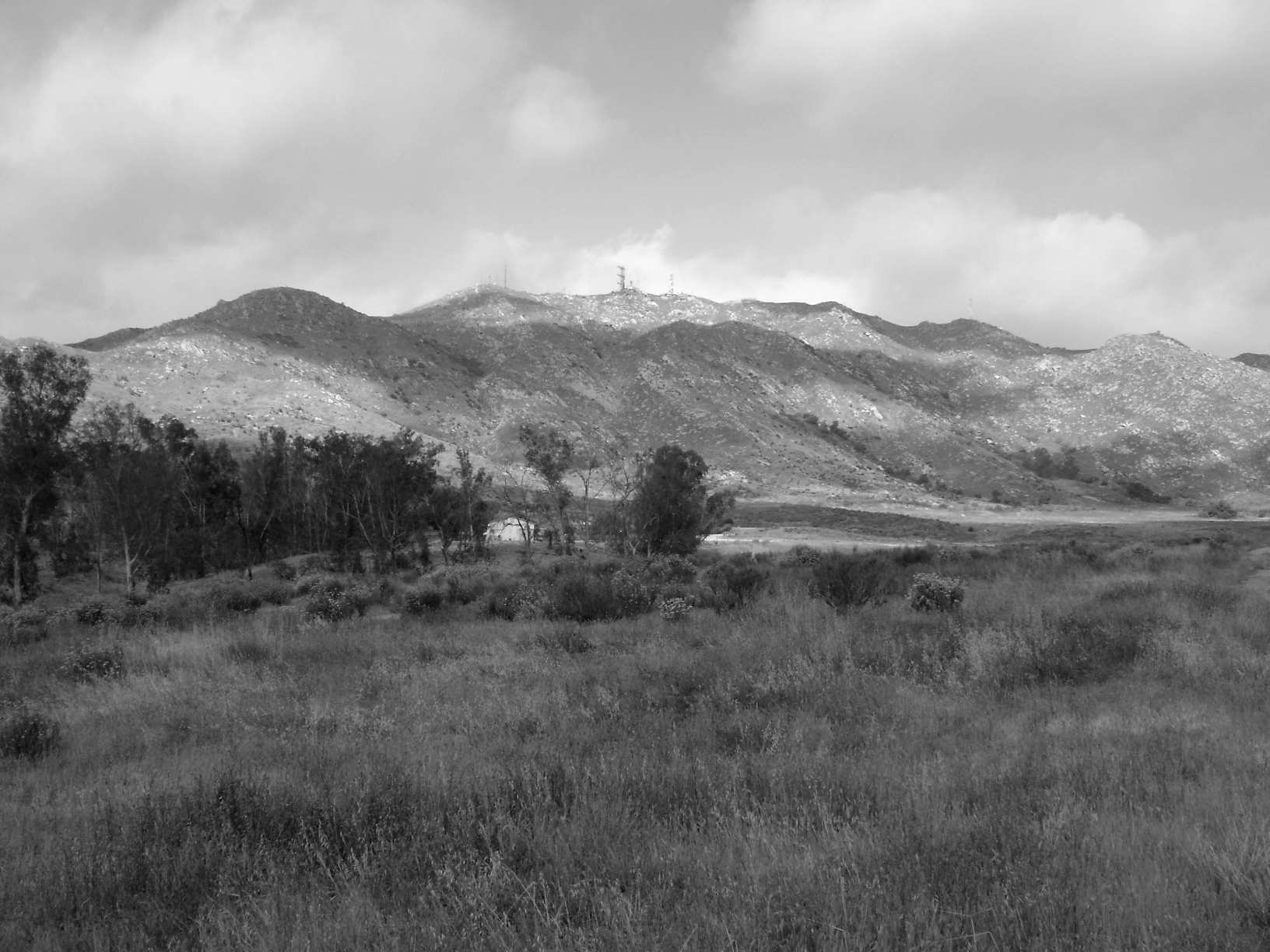
Box Springs Reserve, part of the University of California Natural Reserve System.

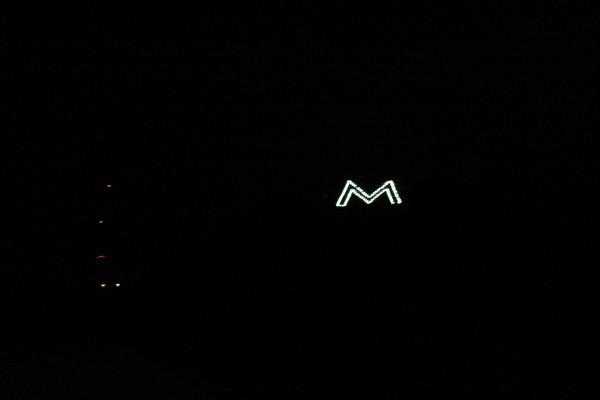
The 'M' of Moreno Valley on the mountain, lit in 2009.

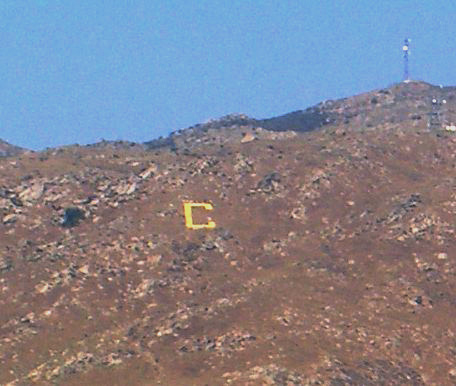
The "Big C" on the mountain.

Box Springs Mountain is said to have gotten its name during the 1880s. Teamsters with horse-drawn wagons would stop at a natural spring in an arroyo of the range to water their horses. A teamster surrounded it with a box to maintain water access, later giving the spring, Box Springs, and the range their names.

The letter "C" is embedded on the Riverside-facing side. The "Big C" was built in 1957, mostly by UC Riverside students. E.L. Yeager donated the materials for it. The "C" is approximately 1,500 feet above the UCR campus, and was the world's largest poured-concrete block letter, 132 feet high by 70 feet wide. The "C" is often vandalized with graffiti.

The letter "M" was embedded on the Moreno Valley side of the mountain in 1966 as a symbol of Moreno Valley High School which was then in the town of Sunnymead. The City of Moreno Valley was officially incorporated as a municipality on December 3, 1984, comprising Sunnymead, Edgemont and the little town of Moreno. The mountain with "M" were included on the new city logo. During the first week of December 2009 Moreno Valley and Southern California Edison lit up the "M" to celebrate the 25th anniversary of cityhood.

== Natural history ==
Box Springs Mountain provides wildlife habitat in the fast-growing Inland Empire Metropolitan Area, with populations of snakes, lizards, coyotes, bobcats, mountain lions, deer and burros, some of which wander into the populace below. There are several large eucalyptus trees that were planted at its base that originally marked sources of water.

The mountain is susceptible to wildfires which char the hillsides and pose a danger to residences at the base of the mountain. However, they are a natural part of fire ecology in the chaparral and woodland natural habitats.

== See also ==
- Box Springs Mountains
- University of California Natural Reserve System
