= Vista del Lago High School (Moreno Valley, California) =

Public school in California, United States

Vista Del Lago High School
- Logo of Vista del Lago High School

Location
- 15150 Lasselle Street; Moreno Valley, California; United States; 33°54′02″N 117°12′27″W

Information
- Type: Public
- Opened: September 5, 2002
- School district: Moreno Valley Unified School District
- Principal: Matthew McCain
- Teaching staff: 96.55 (FTE)
- Grades: 9–12
- Enrollment: 1,953 (2023–2024)
- Student to teacher ratio: 20.23
- Campus type: Suburban
- Colors: Purple, black, and silver
- Mascot: Ravens
- Accreditation: Western Association of Schools and Colleges (WASC)
- Website: http://vistadellago.mvusd.net/

Vista del Lago High School is a secondary school located in Moreno Valley, California. It is one of four comprehensive high schools in the Moreno Valley Unified School District.

== History ==
Vista del Lago opened on September 5, 2002 with a student population of 1,327 for the 2002-2003 school year. The school opened with 9th and 10th grade students only, and half of the projected complement of staff. The school opened to 11th graders the following year, and by the 2004-2005 school year, it was a comprehensive 9-12 high school with 2,268 students.

The projected Academic Performance Index (API) score was 609 for year 2006-2007. Vista del Lago received 605 and for 2007-2008, the projected score was 615. Vista del Lago received a 3-year preliminary WASC accreditation in the spring of 2006.

The student demographic of Vista del Lago for 2006-2007 showed that 55% of students were Hispanic or Latino, 26% were African American, 13% were White, 3% were Asian American, 2% were Filipino-American, and less than one percent Pacific Islander, American Indian or Alaska native or other. The staff was composed of 118 teachers with 92% of them being fully credentialed. 2% are emergency credential. All classes averaged between 25 and 34 students per class. There were six academic counselors servicing over 410 students per counselor.

In June 2011, the largest class of seniors graduated.

In 2015, Vista del Lago had a graduation rate of 91.1%, the highest of the district's high schools.

== School profile ==
Vista del Lago High School is the fifth high school in Moreno Valley Unified School District and the fourth comprehensive high school. As of the 2023-2024 school year, Vista del Lago currently holds #9,054 in National High School Rankings and has a college readiness index of 14.7/100.

The population of the school 47% Hispanic, 32% black, 11% of 2 or more races/ethnicities, 8% Asian, and 2% white. There are seven school counselors.

== Academics ==
As of the 2023-2024 school year, the school offers six career pathways: Visual/Performing Arts, Engineering, Health Career, Graphic Design, and Manufacturing.

For college preparation, the school offers the Advancement Via Individual Determination (AVID) program. Additionally, the Middle College program is offered through the River Community College District. Under a federal grant, Moreno Valley College works with students on STEM subjects.

== Alumni ==
- Tristin Mays, actor
- Joseph Baura, Photographer, Super Bowl Champion with Los Angeles Rams
