= YFS Magazine =

- Website type: Online Magazine
- Available in: English
- Owner: YFS Media
- Website: https://www.yfsmagazine.com
- Commercial: Yes
- Registration: Optional
- Current status: Active
- Content license: Copyright 2009 - 2025

YFS Magazine, which stands for Young, Fabulous & Self-Employed, is a small-business news website and online magazine founded by American business woman, serial entrepreneur, and syndicated columnist Erica Nicole.

== Business overview ==
YFS Magazine launched on December 1, 2009. Published daily, with the exception of Sunday, it features original articles on startups, small business news and entrepreneurial culture. YFS Magazine also reports on related subjects such as small business lifestyle, leadership, finance, technology, marketing, sales, social media, operations, and human capital. The magazine offers editorial coverage on the intersection of entrepreneurship and pop culture.

A large segment of YFS Magazine's audience is young adults between the ages of 25 and 34. YFS Magazine readers have a median age of 29.5 years. Fifty-five percent of readers are female and the average household income is between $50,000 and $150,000+ with a higher than average household income (29 percent) in excess of $100,000.

YFS Magazine describes itself as the "selective and optimistic eye of entrepreneurship culture." The magazine is intended for seed, early stage startup and growth companies.

Young entrepreneurs and companies featured in YFS Magazine have included Rent The Runway, Threadless, Thumbtack, Kiip, JackThreads, Timothy Sykes, Ken Gosnell, Young Entrepreneur Council, College Hunks Hauling Junk, OLX, ModCloth, and Paige Rein of HGTV.

== Reception ==
YFS Magazine has been described by the Visa Business Network as "useful information for entrepreneurs looking to start and grow a business."

Since the initial launch, YFS Magazine has been featured and/or mentioned in The Wall Street Journal, Forbes, Portfolio.com, Fox Business Network, The Huffington Post, Black Enterprise, American Express OPEN Forum, Business Insider, AllBusiness.com, Mashable, AOL.com, Network for Teaching Entrepreneurship, YouNoodle and others.
