= Box Springs Mountains =

Mountain range in California, United States

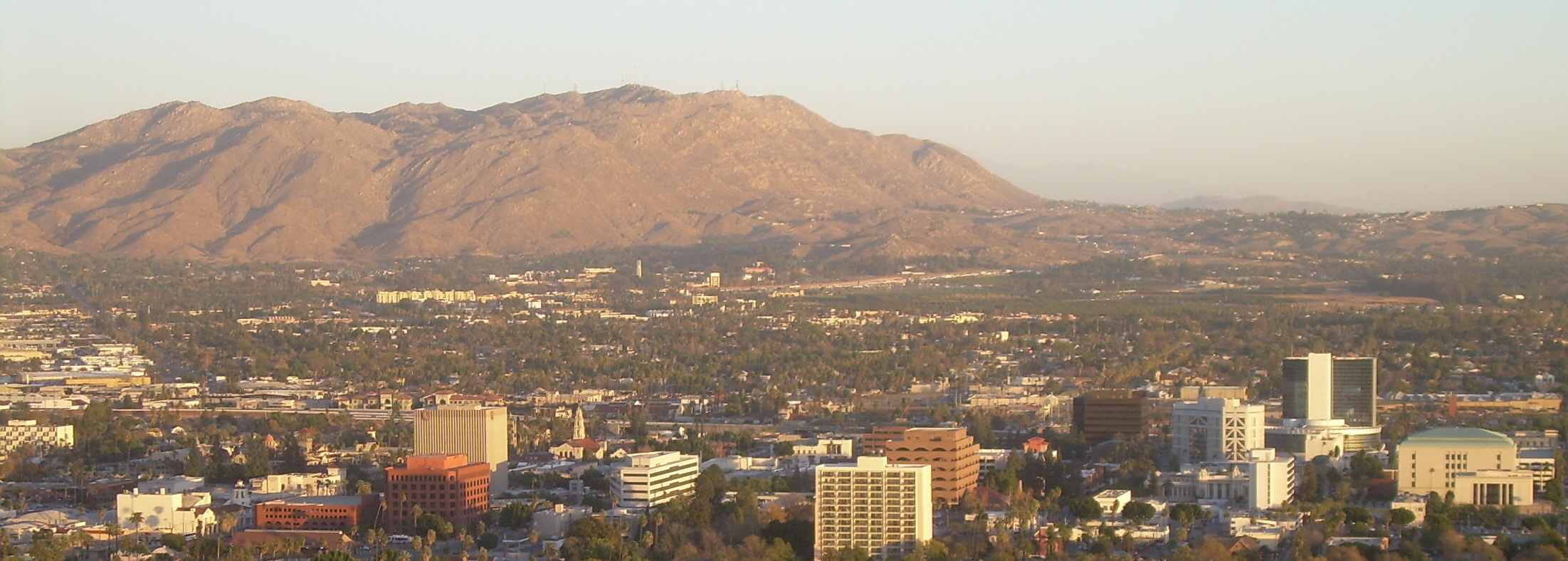
- Box Springs Mountains with Riverside in foreground.

Highest point
- Peak: Box Springs Mountain
- Elevation: 939 m (3,081 ft)

Geography
- Location within California
- Country: United States
- State: California
- Region: Inland Empire
- District: Riverside County
- Range coordinates: 33°57′42″N 117°16′50″W
- Topo map: USGS Riverside East

The Box Springs Mountains are a mountain range in northwest Riverside County, California, United States. The highest peak of the range is Box Springs Mountain, which stands just over 3,080 ft (940 m) tall.

== Parks ==
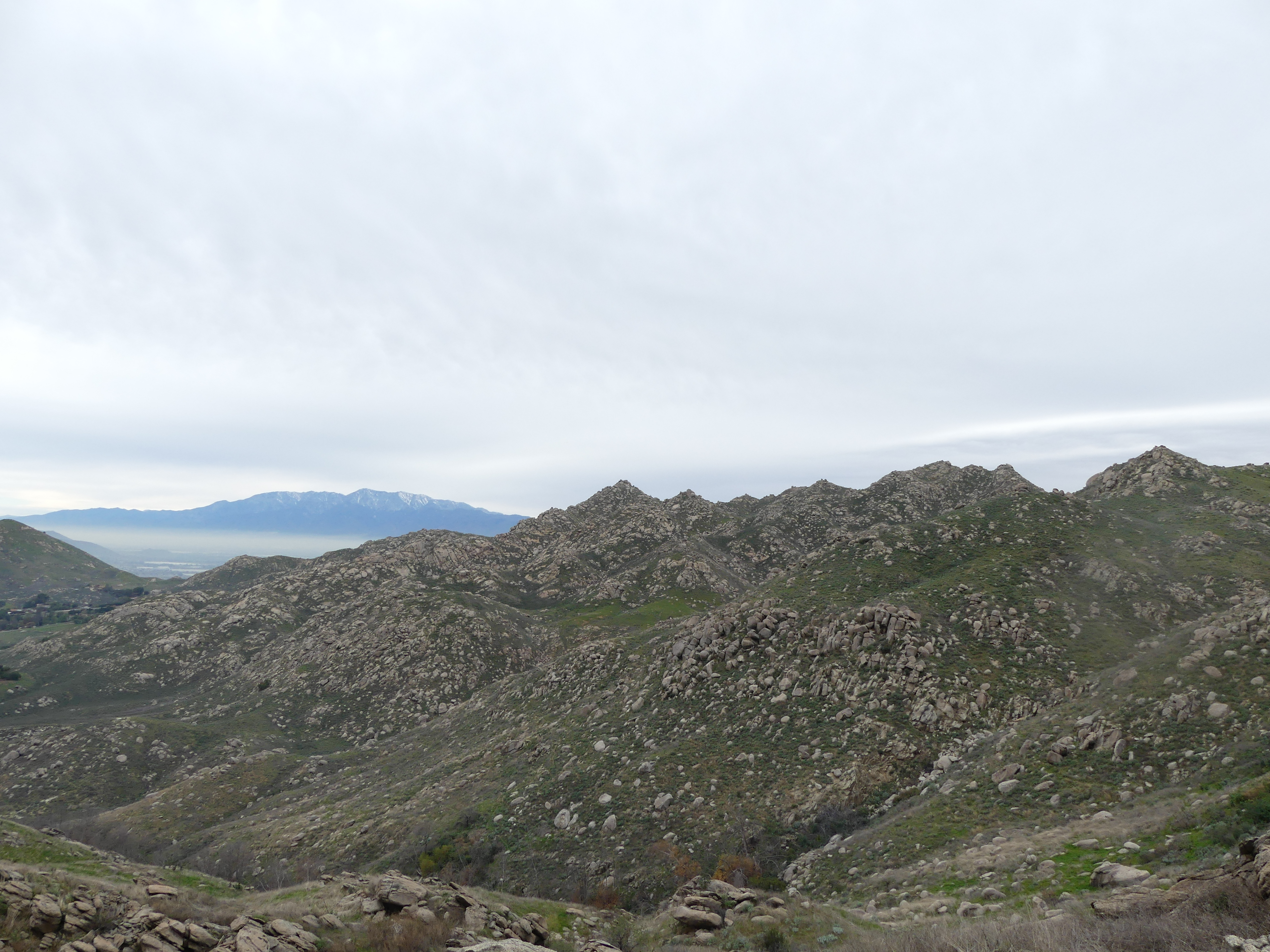
Two Trees Trail, a part of the Box Spring Mountain Reserve.

The Box Spring Mountain Reserve, operated by the Riverside County Regional Park and Open-Space District, encompasses a portion of the Box Spring Mountains.

== Named Peaks ==
Peak	Elevation	Coordinates
Box Springs Mountain	3,080 feet (940 m)	33.96167°N 117.28056°W
Table Mountain	2,359 feet (719 m)	33.99056°N 117.29249°W
Sugarloaf Mountain	1,944 feet (593 m)	33.99371°N 117.32240°W
Jessie	1,781 feet (543 m)	33.94876°N 117.28339°W
Pigeon	1,423 feet (434 m)	33.99295°N 117.32944°W
Versity	1,386 feet (422 m)	33.96773°N 117.32430°W
