= Moreno Valley Unified School District =

Public school district in Riverside County, California

Address
- 25634 Alessandro Boulevard Moreno Valley, California, 92553; United States

District information
- Type: Public
- Grades: K–12
- NCES District ID: 0625800

Students and staff
- Students: 31,597 (2020–2021)
- Teachers: 1,449.51 (FTE)
- Staff: 1,761.44 (FTE)
- Student–teacher ratio: 21.8:1

Other information
- Website: www.mvusd.net

Moreno Valley Unified School District is the third-largest district in Riverside County, the 23rd largest in California, educating more than 34,000 students in grades TK-12 at 40 schools. It is the fourth-largest employer in Moreno Valley.

The Superintendent of Schools is Dr. Alejandro Ruvalcaba. The President of the Board of Education is Brandy Clark. District enrollment peaked at over 37,000 in 2006-07 and has since fallen, leading to the shelving of plans for a fifth comprehensive high school.

== Boundary ==
The district includes most of Moreno Valley, the populated areas of March ARB, and a nonresidential industrial district of Riverside.

== Graduation rate ==
As of 2015 MVUSD's graduation rate had climbed 20% over five years to 86.2%.

== Schools ==
=== Early Education ===
- Early Learning Academy

=== Elementary ===
- Armada
- Bear Valley
- Box Springs
- Butterfield
- Chaparral Hills
- Cloverdale
- Creekside
- Edgemont
- Hendrick Ranch
- Hidden Springs
- Honey Hollow
- La Jolla
- Midland
- Moreno
- North Ridge
- Ramona
- Ridge Crest
- Seneca
- Serrano
- Sugar Hill
- Sunnymead
- Sunnymeadows
- TownGate

=== Middle schools ===
- Badger Springs
- Landmark
- Mountain View
- Palm
- Sunnymead
- Vista Heights

=== High schools ===
- Canyon Springs
- March Mountain
- Moreno Valley
- Valley View
- Vista Del Lago
- Alessandro School K-12 alternative education campus
- Bayside Community Day School 7-12 (Alternative Education)
