= Moreno Valley, California =

City in California, United States

- City
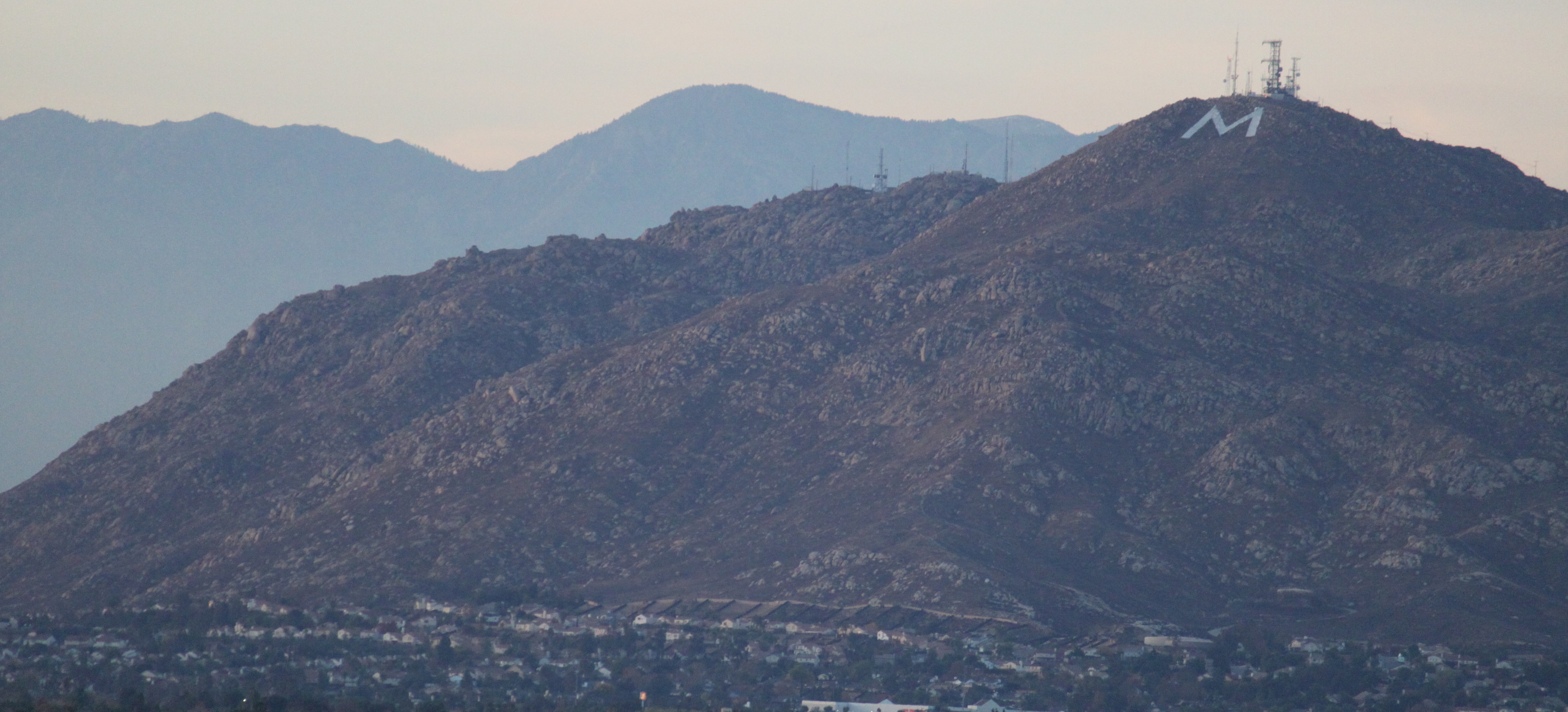
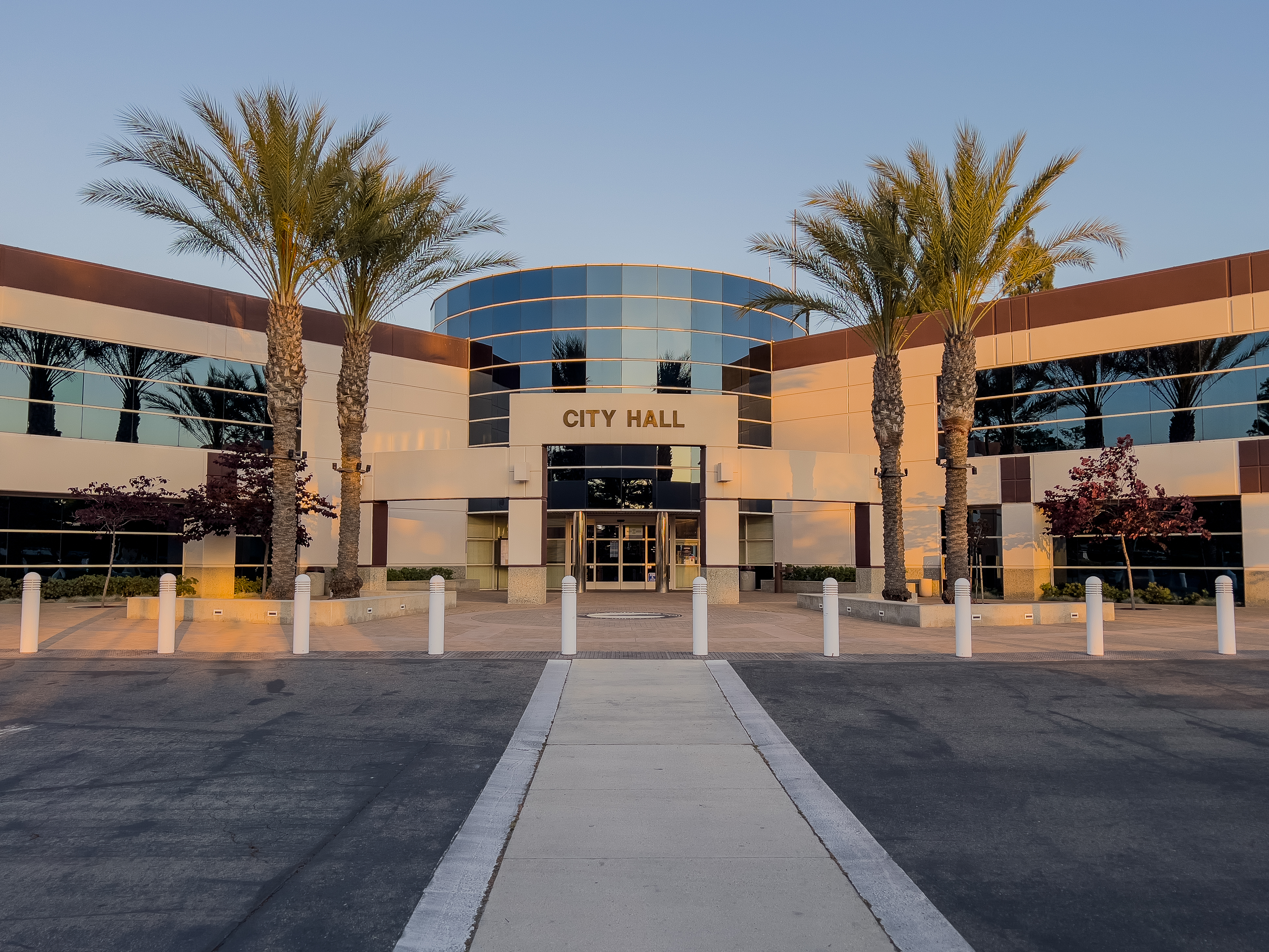
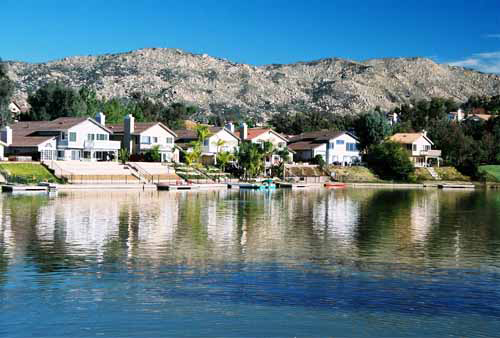
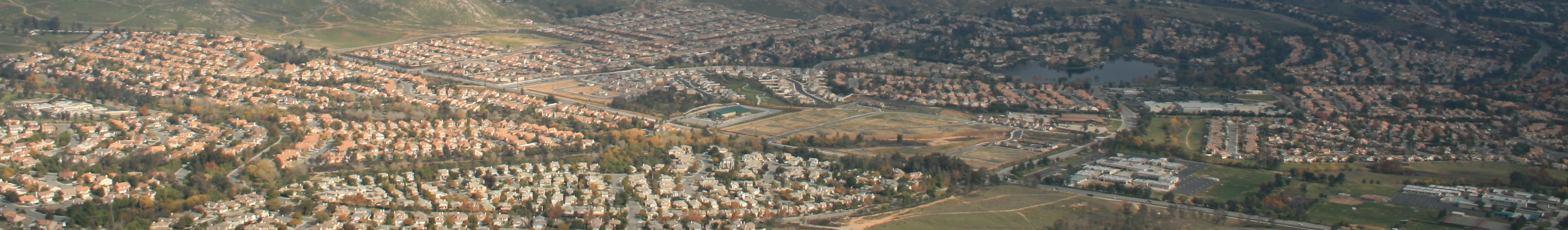
- The giant "M" on Box Springs Mountain for "Moreno Valley" Moreno Valley City Hall Sunnymead Ranch Lake Aerial view of Moreno Valley

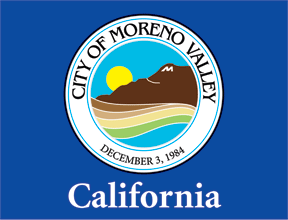
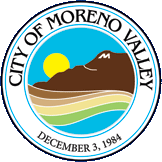
- Flag Seal
- Nickname: "MoVal"
- Motto: "Where Dreams Soar"
- Coordinates: 33°56′35″N 117°13′42″W
- Country: United States
- State: California
- County: Riverside
- Incorporated: December 3, 1984

Government
  - Type: Council-Manager
  - Mayor: Ulises Cabrera
  - Mayor Pro Tem: Elena Baca-Santa Cruz
  - City council: Ed A. Delgado; Cheylynda Barnard; Erlan Gonzalez
  - City Manager: Brian Mohan

Area
  - Total: 51.51 sq mi (133.41 km^{2})
  - Land: 51.30 sq mi (132.86 km^{2})
  - Water: 0.21 sq mi (0.55 km^{2}) 0.39%
- Elevation: 1,631 ft (497 m)

Population (2020)
  - Total: 208,634
  - Rank: 2nd in Riverside County; 21st in California; 112th in the United States
  - Density: 4,153.4/sq mi (1,603.62/km^{2})
- Time zone: UTC−8 (Pacific)
  - Summer (DST): UTC−7 (PDT)
- ZIP codes: 92551–92557
- Area codes: 909, 951
- FIPS code: 06-49270
- GNIS feature IDs: 1668251, 2411159
- Website: moval.gov

Moreno Valley is a city in Riverside County, California, United States, and is part of the Riverside–San Bernardino metropolitan area. It is the second-largest city in Riverside County by population and one of the Inland Empire's population centers. The city's population was 208,634 at the 2020 census. Moreno Valley is also part of the greater Los Angeles metropolitan area.

The city derived its name from the small community of Moreno, which became part of the city of Moreno Valley when the city was incorporated in 1984. Frank E. Brown, one of the founders of the community of Moreno in 1882, declined to have the town named after him, but to honor him, the town was named Moreno, Spanish for brown.

== History ==
=== Indigenous period ===
The Moreno Valley area was first inhabited 2,300 years ago. There are at least 200 prehistoric archaeological locations within the city. The majority of the sites are milling stations – where chaparral seed was the dominant milling activity. Rock art, consisting of pictographs, and petroglyphs are present – though most of the petroglyphs in Moreno Valley consist of boulders with "cupules", or cup-shaped holes pecked into them.

=== Spanish and Mexican periods ===
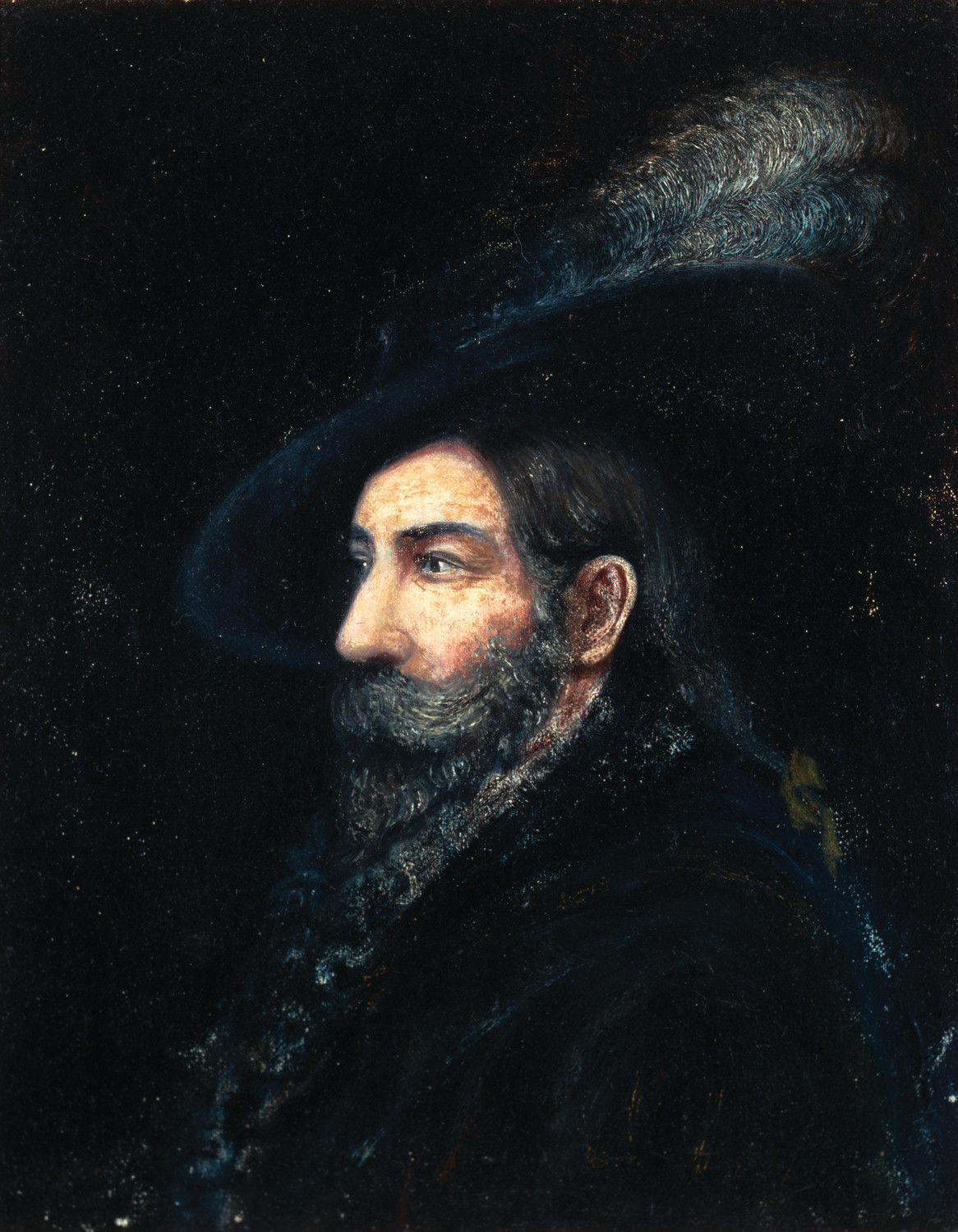
Famed Spanish explorer Juan Bautista de Anza, whose expedition came through the area in 1774

Spanish scouts initially came across descendants of the Shoshone and Luiseño tribes, although other groups, such as the Serrano and Cahuilla, were in the area. The late prehistoric Luiseño and Cahuilla were semisedentary, meaning that they wintered in villages, then spread out in family groups during the spring and summer months to harvest seeds and acorns.

Spanish scouts blazed a number of trails in the area, including the Anza Trail, which runs through the Edgemont area of present-day Moreno Valley.

=== Post-Conquest period ===
When California was admitted to the United States as a state in 1850, Americans began to move into the area. The Tucson-to-San Francisco route of John Butterfield's Overland Mail Company passed through it. Some farmers began to occupy the area, relying upon water from Frank E. Brown's Bear Valley Land and Water Company. Beginning in 1883, the company collected and pumped water from Bear Valley in the San Bernardino Mountains to the north. The area first acquired its current name, Moreno Valley, at this time, referring to Frank Brown (moreno is Spanish for "brown" or "brunet"). In 1899, the city of Redlands won a lawsuit in which the city claimed eminent domain over the Bear Valley water. The resulting loss of service forced most of the area's inhabitants to move.

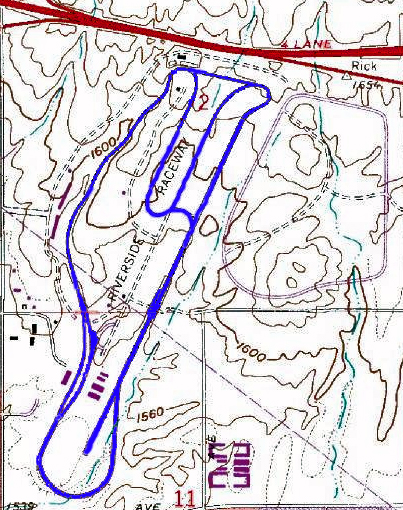
From 1957 to 1989, the Riverside International Raceway occupied the current site of the Moreno Valley Mall.

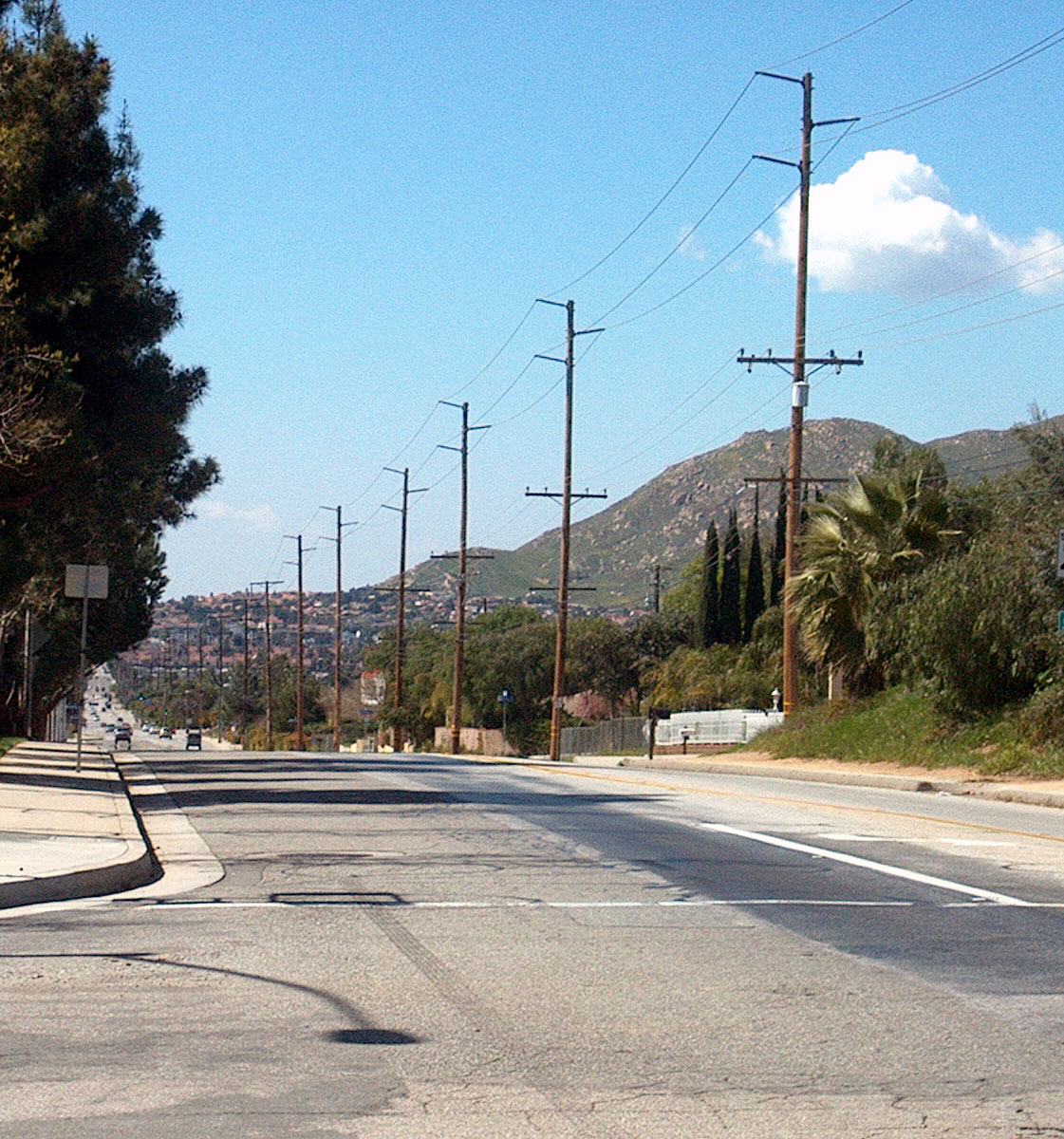
A view of Moreno Valley looking west down Ironwood Avenue. Box Springs Mountain is visible at right.

==== Incorporation and growth ====
By 1984, the population was 49,702 (compared to 18,871 residents in 1970). The state economic boom fueled the construction of new houses and businesses, leading to a push for the area to incorporate as a city. Although similar measures had failed previously in 1968 and 1983, the measure to form the city of Moreno Valley was approved by the area's voters in 1984. On December 3, 1984, the communities of Edgemont, Sunnymead, and Moreno united along with nearby areas to form the general law city of Moreno Valley. The first city council was also elected in 1984. It was composed of Bob Lynn, Judith A. Nieburger, Steven Webb, J. David Horspool (first mayor pro tem), and Marshall C. Scott (first mayor). The city seal and motto were adopted the following year.

==== March Air Reserve Base ====
In November 2008, DHL announced it was leaving the U.S. market and would shut its operation associated with March Air Field in January 2009.

=== 21st century ===
On February 13, 2007, the city council passed, by a vote of 4–1, a resolution christening the eastern half of the city (roughly from Lasselle Street to Gilman Springs Road) "Rancho Belago", a pastiche of Spanish and Italian words. The city council's resolution includes the 92555 ZIP Code within the boundaries of the area, as reported by the Press Enterprise newspaper.

== Geography ==
According to the United States Census Bureau, the city has a total area of 51.5 square miles (133 km^{2}), of which, 51.3 square miles (133 km^{2}) is land and 0.2 square miles (0.52 km^{2}) is water.

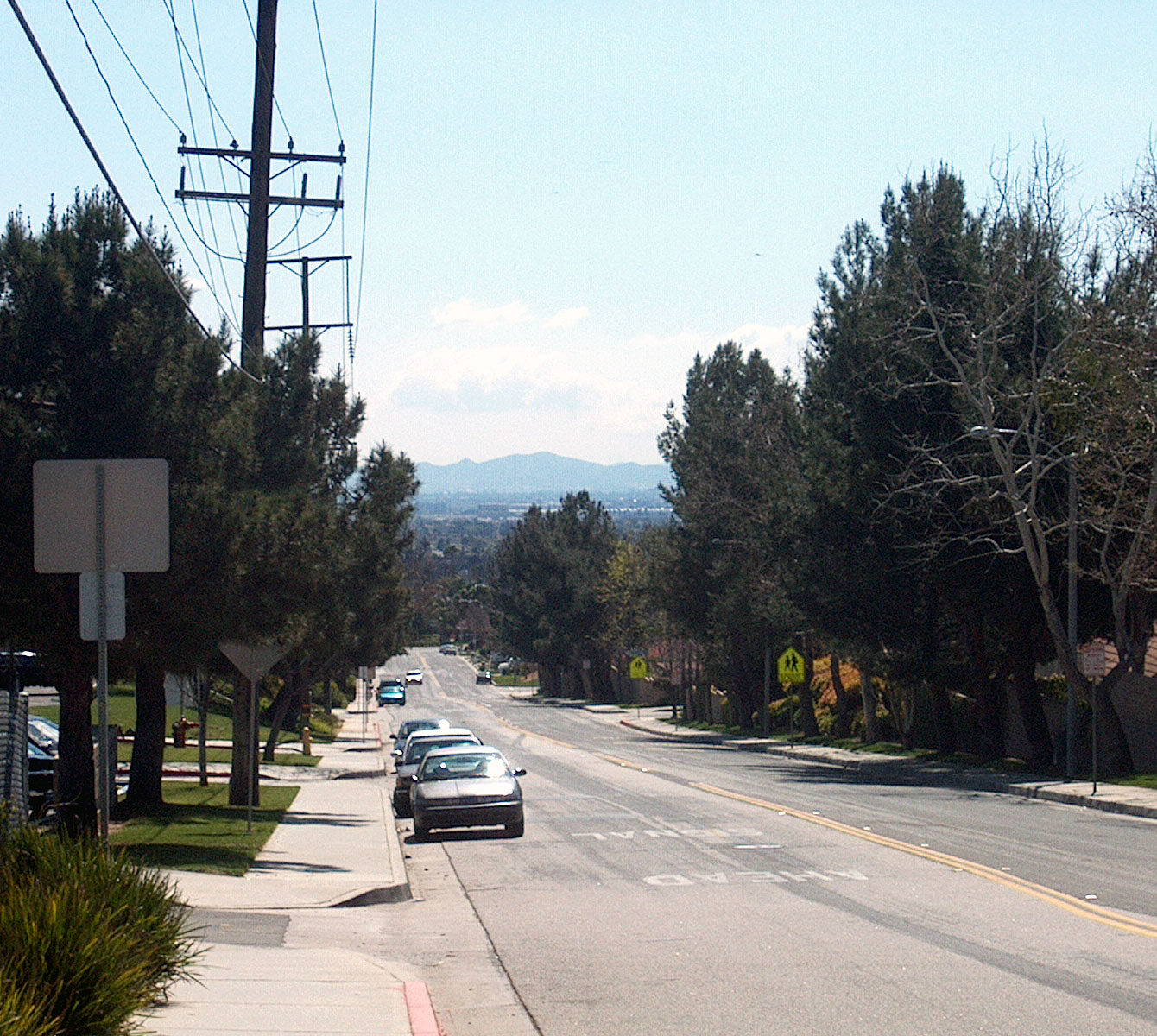
Southern Moreno Valley, viewed looking south down Kitching Street

Moreno Valley is located at a geographic crossroad. To the east lies the San Gorgonio Pass and Coachella Valley; to the south are Lake Perris, Perris, and the San Jacinto Mountains; to the north are the San Bernardino Valley and San Bernardino Mountains. To the west lies neighboring Riverside. It is relatively close to Ontario International Airport.

One of the most visible geographical features in Moreno Valley is Box Springs Mountain. This mountain at the northwest end of the city rises over the city, providing a concrete landmark. The section of the mountain that faces the city has a large letter "M" constructed upon it. This was built privately at the encouragement of the city council, which argued it would foster unity. The letter is located on public land and is maintained entirely by charity. The letter had lights installed on December 3, 2005, to celebrate Moreno Valley's 21st anniversary of its incorporation. The completion of the repairs of heavy damage to the letter, due to extreme rain the year before. The mayor at that time, Bonnie Flickinger, has said that the citizens liked it that way and that the council would try to get it to light up regularly. Between December 2, 2009, and December 6, 2009, Moreno Valley, along with Edison lit up the letter in celebration of the city's 25th anniversary. Several Eagle Scout projects have been dedicated to maintaining the "M".

=== Climate ===
Moreno Valley has a mild semi-arid climate (Köppen BSh), with Mediterranean characteristics. The summer temperatures average in the high 90s, though many days reach well above 100°.

- On average, the warmest month is August.
- The highest recorded temperature was 118 °F (48 °C) in July 2018.
- On average, the coolest month is December.
- The lowest recorded temperature was 22 °F (−6 °C) in 1974.
- The maximum average precipitation occurs in December.

Climate data for Moreno Valley, California
Month	Jan	Feb	Mar	Apr	May	Jun	Jul	Aug	Sep	Oct	Nov	Dec	Year
Record high °F (°C)	97 (36)	92 (33)	98 (37)	104 (40)	108 (42)	112 (44)	118 (48)	113 (45)	115 (46)	108 (42)	98 (37)	93 (34)	118 (48)
Mean daily maximum °F (°C)	68 (20)	68 (20)	72 (22)	76 (24)	81 (27)	89 (32)	95 (35)	96 (36)	92 (33)	83 (28)	74 (23)	67 (19)	80 (27)
Mean daily minimum °F (°C)	43 (6)	44 (7)	46 (8)	49 (9)	54 (12)	57 (14)	62 (17)	62 (17)	59 (15)	53 (12)	46 (8)	42 (6)	51 (11)
Record low °F (°C)	24 (−4)	27 (−3)	29 (−2)	33 (1)	38 (3)	44 (7)	49 (9)	49 (9)	42 (6)	32 (0)	26 (−3)	22 (−6)	22 (−6)
Average precipitation inches (mm)	2.08 (53)	1.72 (44)	.68 (17)	.45 (11)	.31 (7.9)	.01 (0.25)	0 (0)	0 (0)	.08 (2.0)	.32 (8.1)	.74 (19)	2.74 (70)	9.94 (252)
Source 1:
Source 2:

== Demographics ==
Historical population
Census	Pop.	Note	%±
1990	118,779		—
2000	142,381		19.9%
2010	193,365		35.8%
2020	208,634		7.9%
U.S. Decennial Census

Moreno Valley, California – racial and ethnic composition Note: the US Census treats Hispanic/Latino as an ethnic category. This table excludes Latinos from the racial categories and assigns them to a separate category. Hispanics/Latinos may be of any race.
Race / ethnicity (NH = Non-Hispanic)	Pop 1990	Pop 2000	Pop 2010	Pop 2020	% 1990	% 2000	% 2010	% 2020
White alone (NH)	67,815	45,881	36,573	27,670	57.09%	32.22%	18.91%	13.26%
Black or African American alone (NH)	15,656	27,536	33,195	31,582	13.18%	19.34%	17.17%	15.14%
Native American or Alaska Native alone (NH)	627	567	573	536	0.53%	0.40%	0.30%	0.26%
Asian alone (NH)	7,258	8,214	11,423	12,099	6.11%	5.77%	5.91%	5.80%
Pacific Islander alone (NH)	7,258	650	990	1,009	6.11%	0.46%	0.51%	0.48%
Other race alone (NH)	258	295	388	1,227	0.22%	0.21%	0.20%	0.59%
Mixed-race or multiracial (NH)	x	4,549	5,054	6,343	x	3.19%	2.61%	3.04%
Hispanic or Latino (any race)	27,165	54,689	105,169	128,168	22.87%	38.41%	54.39%	61.43%
Total	118,779	142,381	193,365	208,634	100.00%	100.00%	100.00%	100.00%

=== 2020 ===
The 2020 United States census reported that Moreno Valley had a population of 208,634. The population density was 4,064.8 inhabitants per square mile (1,569.4/km^{2}). The racial makeup of Moreno Valley was 22.5% White, 15.9% African American, 1.9% Native American, 6.0% Asian, 0.6% Pacific Islander, 35.8% from other races, and 17.4% from two or more races. Hispanic or Latino of any race were 61.4% of the population.

The census reported that 99.6% of the population lived in households, 0.3% lived in non-institutionalized group quarters, and 0.1% were institutionalized.

There were 55,872 households, out of which 48.5% included children under the age of 18, 52.5% were married-couple households, 7.6% were cohabiting couple households, 25.5% had a female householder with no partner present, and 14.4% had a male householder with no partner present. 11.8% of households were one person, and 4.3% were one person aged 65 or older. The average household size was 3.72. There were 46,555 families (83.3% of all households).

The age distribution was 27.3% under the age of 18, 11.4% aged 18 to 24, 28.3% aged 25 to 44, 22.8% aged 45 to 64, and 10.1% who were 65 years of age or older. The median age was 32.0 years. For every 100 females, there were 95.7 males.

There were 57,413 housing units at an average density of 1,118.6 units per square mile (431.9 units/km^{2}), of which 55,872 (97.3%) were occupied. Of these, 61.9% were owner-occupied, and 38.1% were occupied by renters.

In 2023, the US Census Bureau estimated that the median household income was $87,477, and the per capita income was $28,255. About 10.1% of families and 11.8% of the population were below the poverty line.

=== 2010 ===
The racial makeup of Moreno Valley was 36,546 (18.9%) non-Hispanic White, 34,889 (18.0%) African American, 1,721 (0.9%) Native American, 11,867 (6.1%) Asian, 1,117 (0.6%) Pacific Islander, 51,741 (26.8%) from other races, and 11,061 (5.7%) from two or more races. Hispanic or Latino of any race were 105,169 persons (54.4%).

The Census reported that 192,811 people (99.7% of the population) lived in households, 471 (0.2%) lived in non-institutionalized group quarters, and 83 (0.1%) were institutionalized.

There were 51,592 households, out of which 28,586 (55.4%) had children under the age of 18 living in them, 29,000 (56.2%) were opposite-sex married couples living together, 9,990 (19.4%) had a female householder with no husband present, 4,191 (8.1%) had a male householder with no wife present. There were 3,627 (7.0%) unmarried opposite-sex partnerships, and 375 (0.7%) same-sex married couples or partnerships. 6,094 households (11.8%) were made up of individuals, and 1,611 (3.1%) had someone living alone who was 65 years of age or older. The average household size was 3.74. There were 43,181 families (83.7% of all households); the average family size was 3.99.

The population was spread out, with 62,496 people (32.3%) under the age of 18, 23,563 people (12.2%) aged 18 to 24, 53,726 people (27.8%) aged 25 to 44, 41,446 people (21.4%) aged 45 to 64, and 12,134 people (6.3%) who were 65 years of age or older. The median age was 28.6 years. For every 100 females, there were 95.1 males. For every 100 females age 18 and over, there were 91.3 males.

There were 55,559 housing units at an average density of 1,079.3 per square mile (416.7/km^{2}), of which 33,393 (64.7%) were owner-occupied, and 18,199 (35.3%) were occupied by renters. The homeowner vacancy rate was 3.4%; the rental vacancy rate was 7.5%. 123,863 people (64.1% of the population) lived in owner-occupied housing units and 68,948 people (35.7%) lived in rental housing units.

During 2009–2013, Moreno Valley had a median household income of $54,918, with 19.5% of the population living below the federal poverty line.

== Economy ==
According to the city's 2024 Comprehensive Annual Financial Report, the top employers in the city are:

No.	Employer	No. of employees
1	March Air Reserve Base	7,000
2	Riverside County Regional Medical Center	4,790
3	Amazon	4,683
4	Moreno Valley Unified School District	3,678
5	Ross Dress for Less / DD's Discounts	1,861
6	Kaiser Permanente Community Hospital	1,616
7	Harbor Freight Tools	1,150
8	Procter & Gamble	632
9	Val Verde Unified School District	655
10	City of Moreno Valley	517

== Government ==
Moreno Valley vote by party in presidential elections
Year	Democratic	Republican	Third parties
2020	67.24% 48,360	30.80% 22,148	1.96% 1,412
2016	67.35% 37,673	27.21% 15,221	5.43% 3,039
2012	68.83% 35,406	29.44% 15,146	1.73% 889
2008	65.56% 32,205	32.86% 16,141	1.58% 774
2004	52.59% 21,417	46.43% 18,907	0.98% 398
2000	56.02% 19,589	41.12% 14,377	2.86% 999
1996	51.77% 16,477	38.09% 12,123	10.14% 3,228
1992	41.56% 15,462	34.54% 12,849	23.90% 8,889

=== Local ===
Moreno Valley incorporated in 1984 as a general law city. It currently uses the council-manager form of government. The city is divided into four council districts, each of which elect a representative to the city council. The mayor is directly elected at-large. The council chooses one of its members to serve as mayor pro tem. The council also selects the city manager, city attorney, city clerk.

The current City Council consists of:

- Mayor: Ulises Cabrera
- District 1: Elena Baca-Santa Cruz
- District 2: Ed Delgado
- District 3: Erlan Gonzalez
- District 4: Cheylynda Barnard

=== State and federal ===
In the state legislature, Moreno Valley is in the 31st senatorial district, represented by Democrat Sabrina Cervantes, and in the 60th Assembly district, represented by Democrat Corey Jackson.

In the United States House of Representatives, Moreno Valley is in California's 39th congressional district, represented by Democrat Mark Takano.

== Education ==
Moreno Valley's primary and secondary education needs are fulfilled by two school districts: the majority of the city is in the Moreno Valley Unified School District, while a portion is in the Val Verde Unified School District. A part of the city's territory extends into the San Jacinto Unified School District. The former serves approximately 35,000 students, the bulk of the city's children, and has 35 schools, including five high schools: Moreno Valley High School, Canyon Springs High School, Valley View High School, March Mountain High School, and Vista del Lago High School. Val Verde District serves part of southern and eastern Moreno Valley, in addition to parts of Perris, Mead Valley, and unincorporated areas. It serves about 13,000 students and maintains 12 schools; one of its high schools, Rancho Verde High School, is located in Moreno Valley. Some private schools exist, including the local Valley Christian Academy, established in 1979, and Calvary Chapel Christian School, which serves students Kindergarten to twelfth grade. There is also growing number of charter schools within Moreno Valley area including Excel Prep Charter School – Inland Empire, a K–6 school, Riverside County Educational Academy, and Audeo Charter School, a 6–12 independent study program.

The Riverside Community College District, RCCD, serves 6,500 students at their Moreno Valley College campus. The city is also the location of one of the twenty-six Chapman University campuses. In neighboring Riverside, students may attend RCCD's main campus, Riverside Community College, the University of California, Riverside, La Sierra University or California Baptist University. California State University, San Bernardino is another popular school for city high school graduates.

Moreno Valley has three public libraries.

== Infrastructure ==
=== Transportation ===
The heavily traveled routes of State Route 60 (locally called the Moreno Valley Freeway) and Interstate 215 both pass through the city.

Metrolink offers commuter rail transit via the Moreno Valley/March Field station, located just west of the city limits. Monday through Friday service is provided on the 91/Perris Valley Line connecting the Moreno Valley area with Riverside and Downtown Los Angeles to the north and Perris to the south. The Riverside Transit Agency provides local and express/commuter bus services.

=== Healthcare ===
There are two hospitals in Moreno Valley:

- Kaiser Permanente Community Hospital, formerly Moreno Valley Community Hospital, is a general acute care hospital with basic emergency services, as of 2008. Kaiser Permanente officially acquired the Moreno Valley Community Hospital and took complete control in July 2008. Current Kaiser Permanente members began receiving notification of the purchase in March 2008. Moreno Valley residents will not feel the effects of the acquisition immediately, as Kaiser Permanente members were asked to continue using the nearby Riverside facility and the Moreno Valley Clinic for hospital services while the transition process is completed. Kaiser Permanente is planning to increase the size and capacity of the new hospital by adding a new 80+ patient tower and expanding the main facility, as well as increasing the size of the emergency and operating rooms.
- Riverside County Regional Medical Center is a general acute care hospital with basic emergency services and a Level I Trauma Center.

== Public safety ==
Moreno Valley is served by its own regional station of the Riverside County Sheriff's Department for law enforcement. The station is currently commanded by Sheriff's Captain Joel Ontiveros, who also functions as Moreno Valley's Chief of Police.

The city of Moreno Valley contracts for fire and paramedic services with the Riverside County Fire Department through a cooperative agreement with CAL FIRE. 7 paramedic engines and a truck company provide both fire and paramedic services to the city.

American Medical Response is responsible for transports to emergency departments via paramedic ambulance.

== Notable people ==
- Mark Contreras: baseball outfielder
- Da'Mon Cromartie-Smith: safety for the Pittsburgh Steelers, graduated from Rancho Verde High School in 2005
- Greg Dobbs: third baseman for Philadelphia Phillies graduated from Canyon Springs High School in 1996
- Natalie Duran: rock climber
- Lindsay Ellingson: model, graduated from Canyon Springs High School
- Danny Figueroa, serial killer known as the "Backwoods Sniper"
- Becky G: singer and actress, partially lived in Moreno Valley
- Andrew Garcia: singer-songwriter
- Elisabeth Harnois: actress, attended Canyon Springs High School
- Ray Haynes: politician
- Sumaya Kazi: entrepreneur, graduated from Canyon Springs High School in 2000
- Bobby Kielty: professional baseball player with the Boston Red Sox, graduated from Canyon Springs High School
- Kawhi Leonard: professional basketball player with the Los Angeles Clippers, attended Palm Middle School and Canyon Springs High School
- Bob Lynn: politician
- Ryan Madson: Washington Nationals pitcher, graduated from Valley View High School in 1998
- Andre McGee: college basketball player for the University of Louisville, graduated from Canyon Springs High School in 2005
- Charlotte Morgan: softball player, played for the Alabama Crimson Tide, drafted first overall in the 2010 National Pro Fastpitch senior draft
- Rick Ortiz, football player
- Troy Percival: former Anaheim Angels All-Star Pitcher, World Series Champion, attended Moreno Valley High School
- Ronald Powell: professional football player, graduated from Rancho Verde High School in 2010
- AJ Rafael, Filipino-American singer-songwriter
- D'Aundre Reed: 2011 NFL draftee to the Minnesota Vikings, graduated from Rancho Verde High School in 2006
- Terrelle Smith: fullback for Arizona Cardinals, graduated from Canyon Springs High School in 1996
- Tyron Smith: Dallas Cowboys offensive lineman, graduated from Rancho Verde High School in 2008
- Michael Snaer: college basketball player for Florida State University, graduated from Rancho Verde High School in 2009
- Michael Sorich: actor, writer and director, voice actor in the Power Rangers franchise, graduated from Moreno Valley High School in 1975
- Kyle Turley: Kansas City Chiefs star, graduated from Valley View High School
- Derrick Ward: New York Giants running back, graduated from Valley View High School
- Beverly Yanez: former American professional soccer forward and midfielder who played for Reign FC in the National Women's Soccer League, raised in Moreno Valley and attended Moreno Valley High School in 2004

== Sister cities ==
- San Juan de los Lagos, Mexico
