= Menifee, California =

City in California, United States

- City
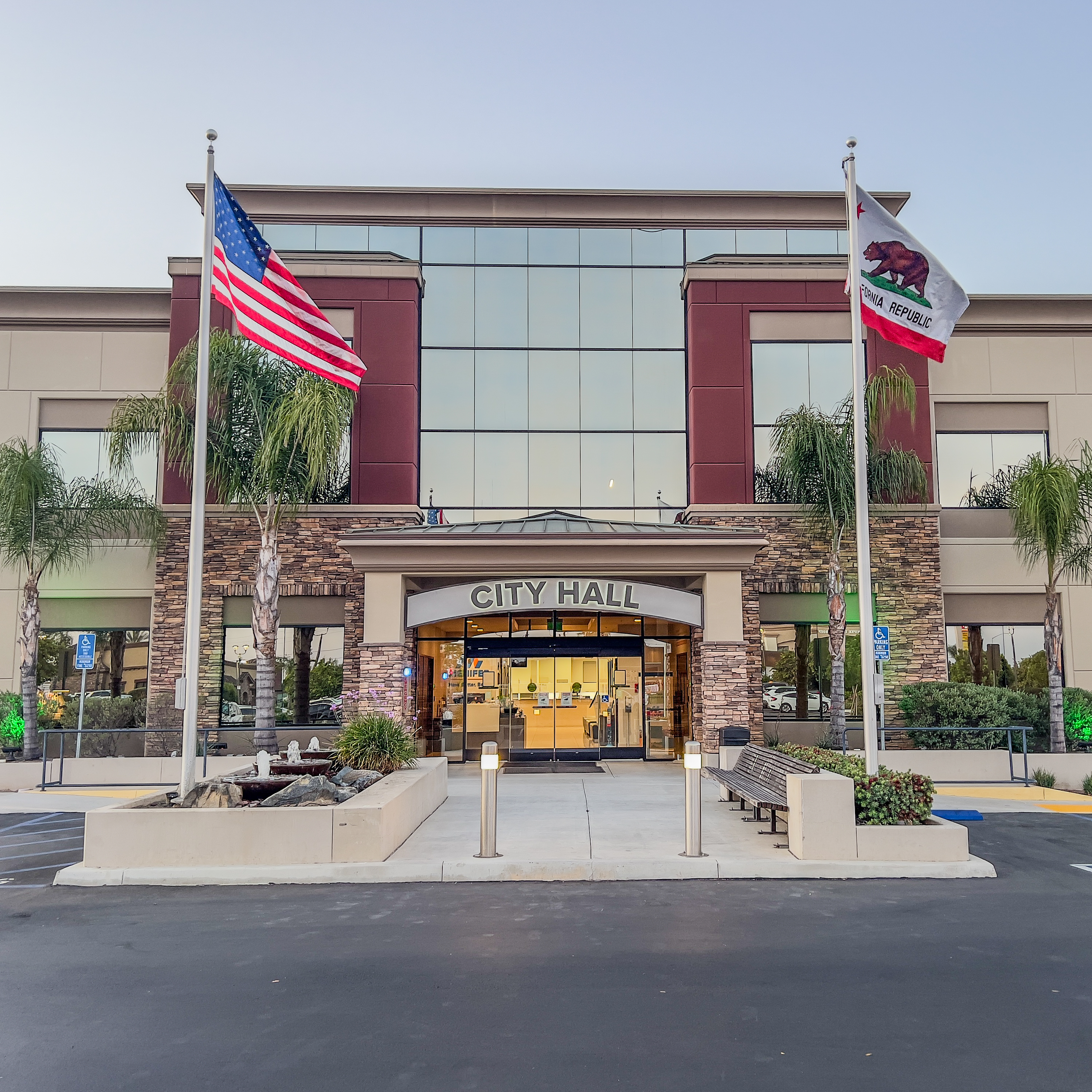
- Menifee City Hall

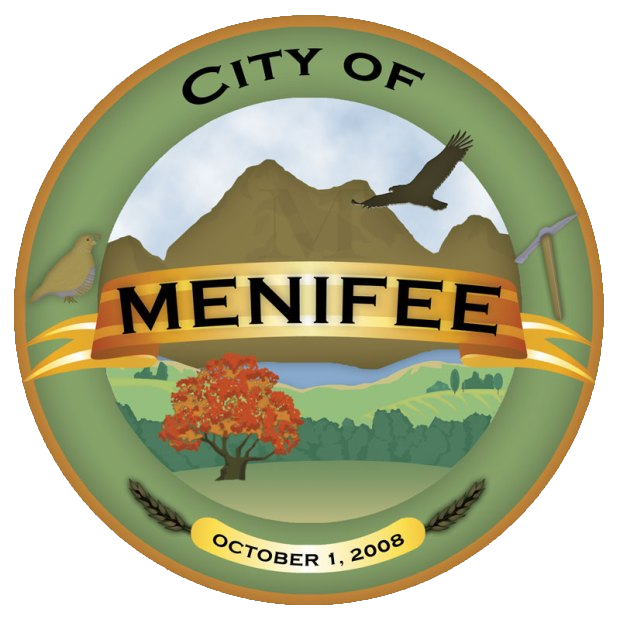
- Seal
- Interactive map of Menifee, California
- Location in the United States Menifee (California) Menifee (the United States)
- Coordinates: 33°41′27″N 117°11′06″W
- Country: United States
- State: California
- County: Riverside
- Region: Southern California
- Incorporated: October 1, 2008

Government
  - Type: Council-Manager
  - Mayor: Ricky Estrada
  - Acting Mayor: Bob Karwin
  - City Council: Dean Deines; Ben Diederich; Daniel Temple
  - City Manager: Armando G. Villa

Area
  - Total: 46.62 sq mi (120.75 km^{2})
  - Land: 46.48 sq mi (120.37 km^{2})
  - Water: 0.15 sq mi (0.38 km^{2}) 0.30%
- Elevation: 1,424 ft (434 m)

Population (2020)
  - Total: 102,527
  - Estimate (2024): 117,041
  - Rank: 6th in Riverside County; 55th in California; 259th in the United States
  - Density: 2,353.68/sq mi (908.76/km^{2})
- Time zone: UTC−8 (Pacific)
  - Summer (DST): UTC−7 (PDT)
- ZIP codes: 92584–92587, 92596
- Area code: 951
- FIPS code: 06-46842
- GNIS feature IDs: 252936, 2497157
- Website: www.menifee.ca.gov

Menifee is a city in Riverside County, California, United States, and is part of the Inland Empire. Named after a local miner, Luther Menifee Wilson, it was settled in the 19th century, and incorporated as a city in 2008. As of the 2020 census, Menifee had a population of 102,527.

The city is centrally located in Southern California in the Menifee Valley. It is almost 15 miles (24 km) north of Temecula and just north of Murrieta. Menifee is roughly 46 square miles (100 km^{2}) in size and has an elevation of 1,424 feet (434 m). The incorporated City of Menifee includes the communities of Sun City, Quail Valley, and Romoland.

== History ==
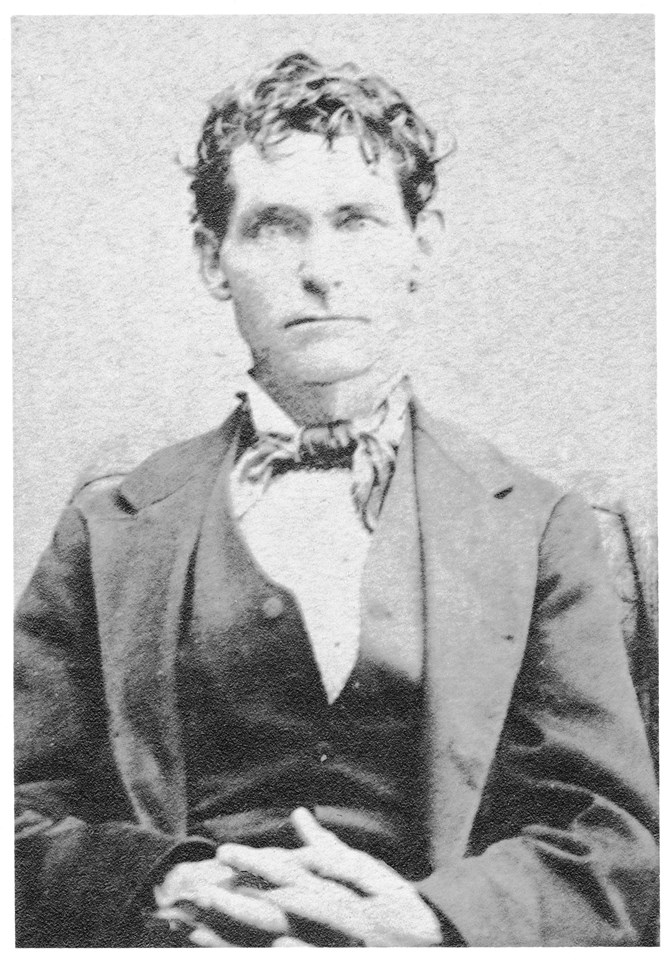
Luther Menifee Wilson

In the 18th century, the area fell under Spanish rule and was ceded by Mexico to the United States in 1848 as a result of the Mexican–American War.

Farming, which began in the mid-19th century, was concentrated in the Menifee area. Mining began in the early 1880s with the discovery of a significant quartz lode by miner Luther Menifee Wilson, from whom Menifee derived its name. Wilson discovered a gold-bearing quartz ledge near present-day Holland and Murrieta roads in 1883, and filed a claim with the San Diego County Recorder's office for this new "Menifee" mine. At the time, the area was referred to as the Menifee Valley.

Early development of the Menifee area began with Sun City in the early 1960s, conceptualized as an active retirement community by Del Webb, a building contractor from Phoenix, Arizona. Webb also developed Sun City, Arizona, under the same concept. Sun City is located in the northwestern part of Menifee and features a mix of residential and commercial activity.

The Menifee area later grew during the late 1980s and early 1990s as a master-planned community. However, a lack of resources such as industry-oriented occupations and high-density retail and commercial businesses caused many residents to drive to cities such as Temecula or Murrieta to shop, dine, or work. In recent years, however, there has been substantial growth in Menifee, attracting many new residents from all areas of Southern California such as San Diego, Orange County and Los Angeles, as well as other parts of the Inland Empire.

On June 3, 2008, the residents of the communities encompassing the Menifee area voted to incorporate together to form Riverside County's 26th city. The City of Menifee was officially established on October 1, 2008.

== Geography ==
The city of Menifee is bordered on the north, west, south and east by the cities of Perris, Canyon Lake, Lake Elsinore, Wildomar, Murrieta, and the community of Winchester. The city center of Menifee lies at the intersection of Newport Road and Interstate 215.

According to the United States Census Bureau, the city covers an area of 46.6 square miles (120.7 km^{2}), 99.70% of it land, and 0.30% of it water.

The Menifee Hills are a ridge approximately 2 miles long and 1.5 miles wide, with a high point of 2,141 ft. Bell Mountain is a 1,848 ft mountain located in Menifee.

=== Climate ===
Menifee

Climate chart (precipitation, max. and min. temperature)
J	F	M	A	M	J	J	A	S	O	N	D
1.8 68 39	2.3 67 40	0.7 72 44	0.6 76 48	0.2 83 54	0 89 58	0.2 97 65	0.1 98 64	0.1 94 60	0.6 82 52	0.9 75 44	2.1 66 38
- █ Average max. and min. temperatures in °F
- █ Precipitation totals in inches
- Source: weathercurrents.com/menifee
Metric conversion
J	F	M	A	M	J	J	A	S	O	N	D
45 20 4	58 19 4	19 22 7	14 24 9	4.8 28 12	0 32 14	4.1 36 18	3 37 18	2.3 34 16	15 28 11	22 24 7	53 19 3
- █ Average max. and min. temperatures in °C
- █ Precipitation totals in mm

Menifee has mild winters and hot dry summers.

- The highest recorded temperature was 117 °F (47 °C) on June 20, 2016.
- On average, the coldest month is December.
- The lowest recorded temperature was 18 °F (−8 °C) on January 1, 1976.
- The maximum average precipitation occurs in February.

Menifee has a Mediterranean climate or Dry-Summer Subtropical (Köppen climate classification Csa). Menifee enjoys plenty of sunshine throughout the year, with an average of 263 sunshine days and only 35 days with measurable precipitation annually of 12.51 inches of rainfall.

The period of April through October is hot and dry with average high temperatures of 83 to 101 °F (28 to 38 °C) and lows of 42 to 66 °F (6 to 19 °C), though in the summer, temperatures can easily exceed 105 °F. The period of November through March is somewhat rainy, as shown in the adjacent table. At times, during the winter, large dust storms may form due to the large mass of humidity and low, flat land.

== Demographics ==
Historical population
Census	Pop.	Note	%±
2010	77,519		—
2020	102,527		32.3%
2024 (est.)	117,041	▲	14.2%
U.S. Decennial Census

=== 2020 census ===
Menifee city, California – Racial and ethnic composition Note: the US Census treats Hispanic/Latino as an ethnic category. This table excludes Latinos from the racial categories and assigns them to a separate category. Hispanics/Latinos may be of any race.
Race / Ethnicity (NH = Non-Hispanic)	Pop 2010	Pop 2020	% 2010	% 2020
White alone (NH)	41,988	44,973	54.16%	43.86%
Black or African American alone (NH)	3,630	6,482	4.68%	6.32%
Native American or Alaska Native alone (NH)	314	390	0.41%	0.38%
Asian alone (NH)	3,597	6,292	4.64%	6.14%
Native Hawaiian or Pacific Islander alone (NH)	262	438	0.34%	0.43%
Other race alone (NH)	124	548	0.16%	0.53%
Mixed race or Multiracial (NH)	2,053	4,655	2.65%	4.54%
Hispanic or Latino (any race)	25,551	38,749	32.96%	37.79%
Total	77,519	102,527	100.00%	100.00%

The 2020 United States census reported that Menifee had a population of 102,527. The population density was 2,206.1 inhabitants per square mile (851.8/km^{2}). The racial makeup of Menifee was 52.2% White, 6.8% African American, 1.3% Native American, 6.5% Asian, 0.5% Pacific Islander, 16.5% from other races, and 16.4% from two or more races. Hispanic or Latino of any race were 37.8% of the population.

The census reported that 99.8% of the population lived in households, 115 people (0.1%) lived in non-institutionalized group quarters, and 49 people (0.0%) were institutionalized.

There were 34,706 households, out of which 34.8% included children under the age of 18, 56.1% were married-couple households, 5.7% were cohabiting couple households, 24.8% had a female householder with no partner present, and 13.4% had a male householder with no partner present. 20.8% of households were one person, and 13.4% were one person aged 65 or older. The average household size was 2.95. There were 25,713 families (74.1% of all households).

The age distribution was 23.6% under the age of 18, 7.9% aged 18 to 24, 24.9% aged 25 to 44, 24.1% aged 45 to 64, and 19.4% who were 65 years of age or older. The median age was 39.6 years. For every 100 females, there were 93.8 males.

There were 36,526 housing units at an average density of 785.9 units per square mile (303.4 units/km^{2}), of which 34,706 (95.0%) were occupied. Of these, 77.4% were owner-occupied, and 22.6% were occupied by renters.

During 2019–2023, Menifee had a median household income of $89,183, with 9.6% of the population living below the federal poverty line.

== Economy ==
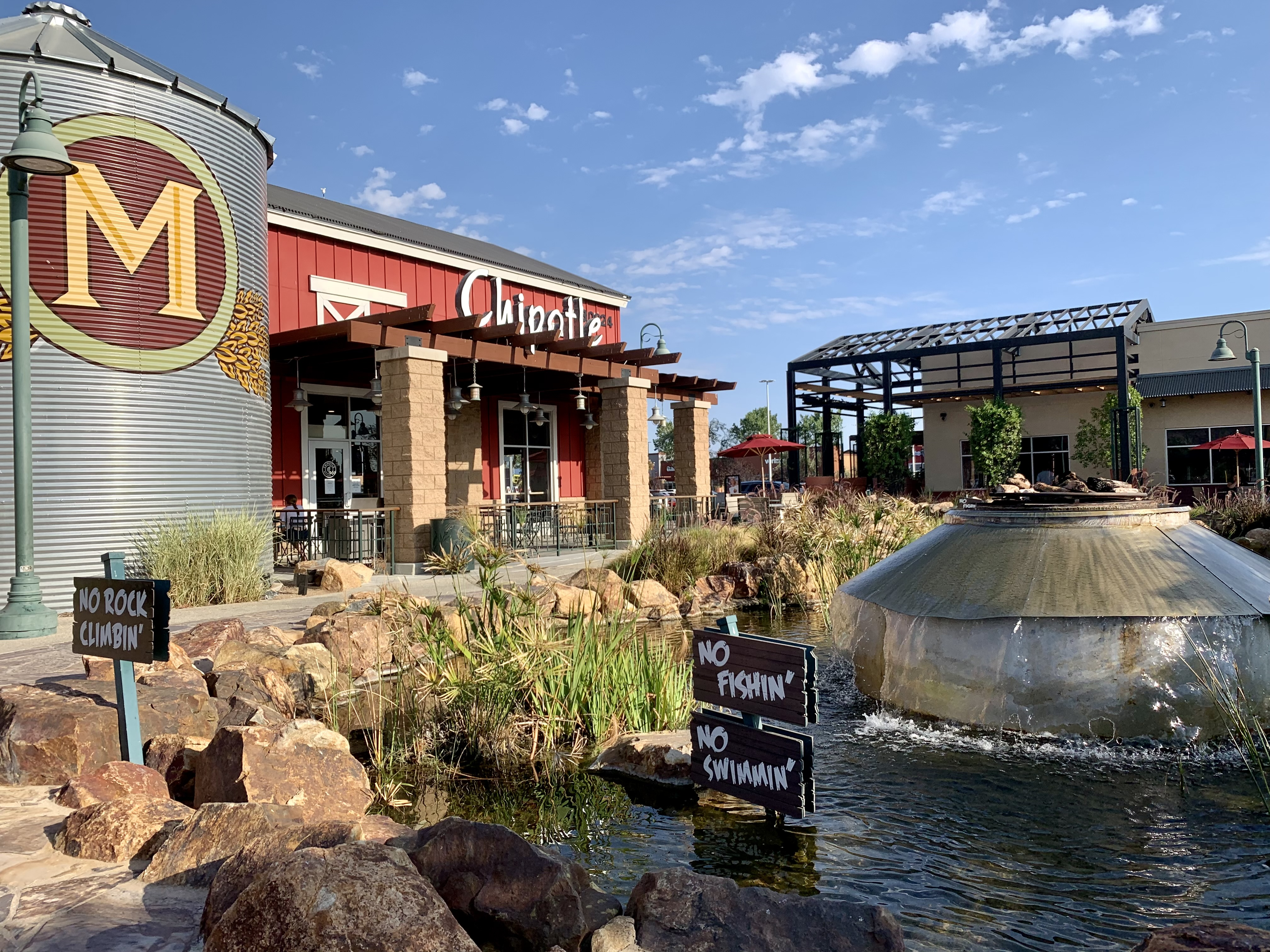
Menifee Countryside Marketplace shopping center

=== Top employers ===
According to the city's 2024 Comprehensive Annual Financial Report, the ten largest employers in the city are:

#	Employer	# of Employees
1	Mt. San Jacinto College District	1,604
2	Menifee Union School District	1,505
3	Romoland Elementary School District	793
4	Menifee Global Medical Center	362
5	Stater Brothers	348
6	City of Menifee	345
7	United Parcel Service (UPS)	232
8	Southern California Edison	189
9	Texas Roadhouse	188
10	Olive Garden	140

== Parks and recreation ==
As of January 2026, Menifee has 47 public parks, of which 23 are city-owned and 24 are Valley-wide owned parks. In October 2025, the Menifee City Council voted to make steps towards potentially annexing 12 of the Valley-wide owned parks, in order to bring them under the city's control.

Menifee's 4-acre (1.6 ha) Gale Webb Action Sports Park is the largest extreme bike park in Southern California. The city also possesses the locally-popular Audie Murphy Ranch Skate Park.

As of June 2026, an amphitheater is partially constructed in Menifee's Central Park; construction has been on-hold since Fall 2025. It will serve as an entertainment venue for performers; the project will cost the city an estimated $6.6 to $6.78 million.

=== Menifee Hills Open Space ===
In June 2025, the City of Menifee bought the Menifee Hills and designated it as open space for 1.15 million dollars, preserving 398 acres for recreation.

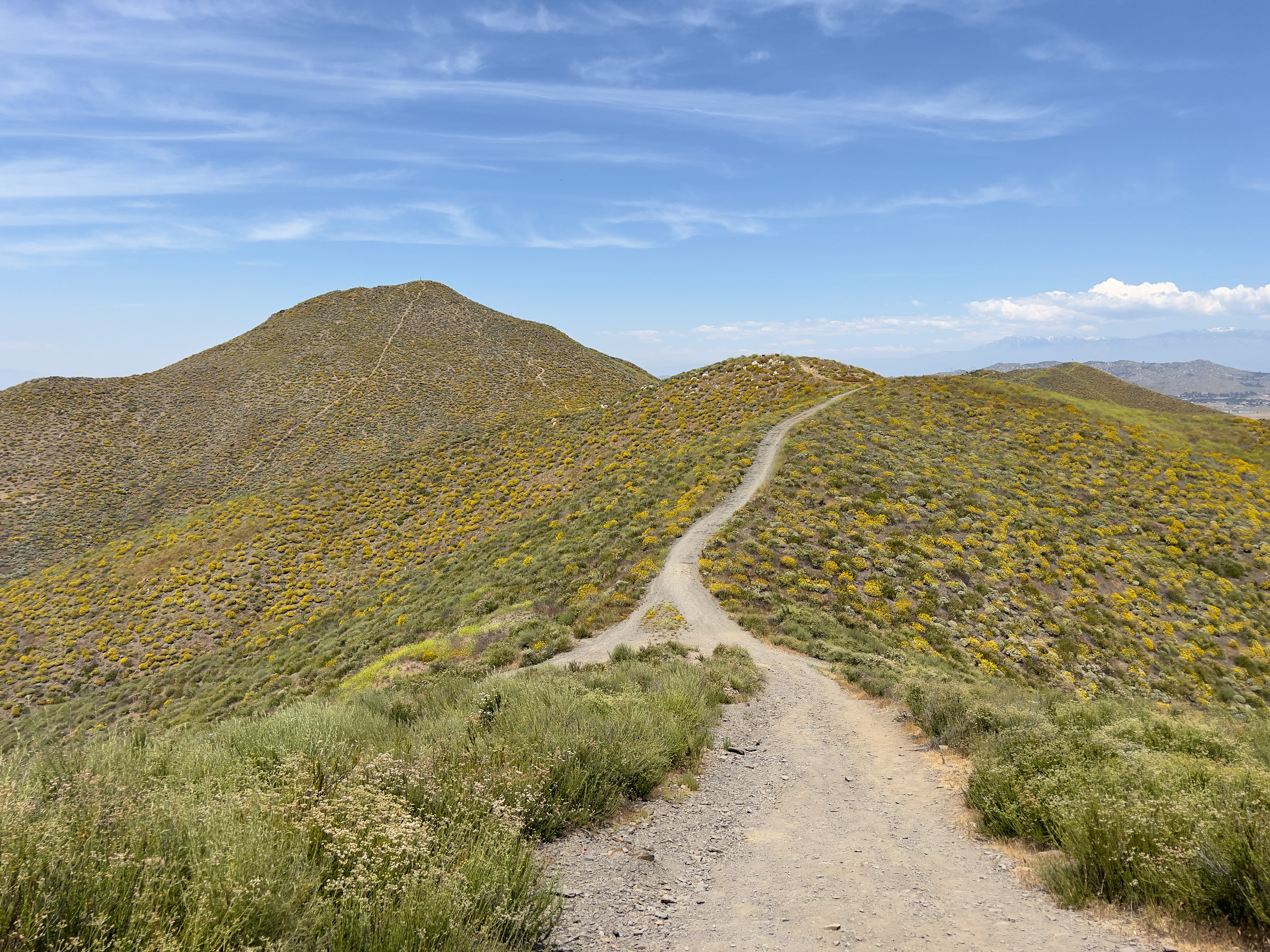
Menifee Hills

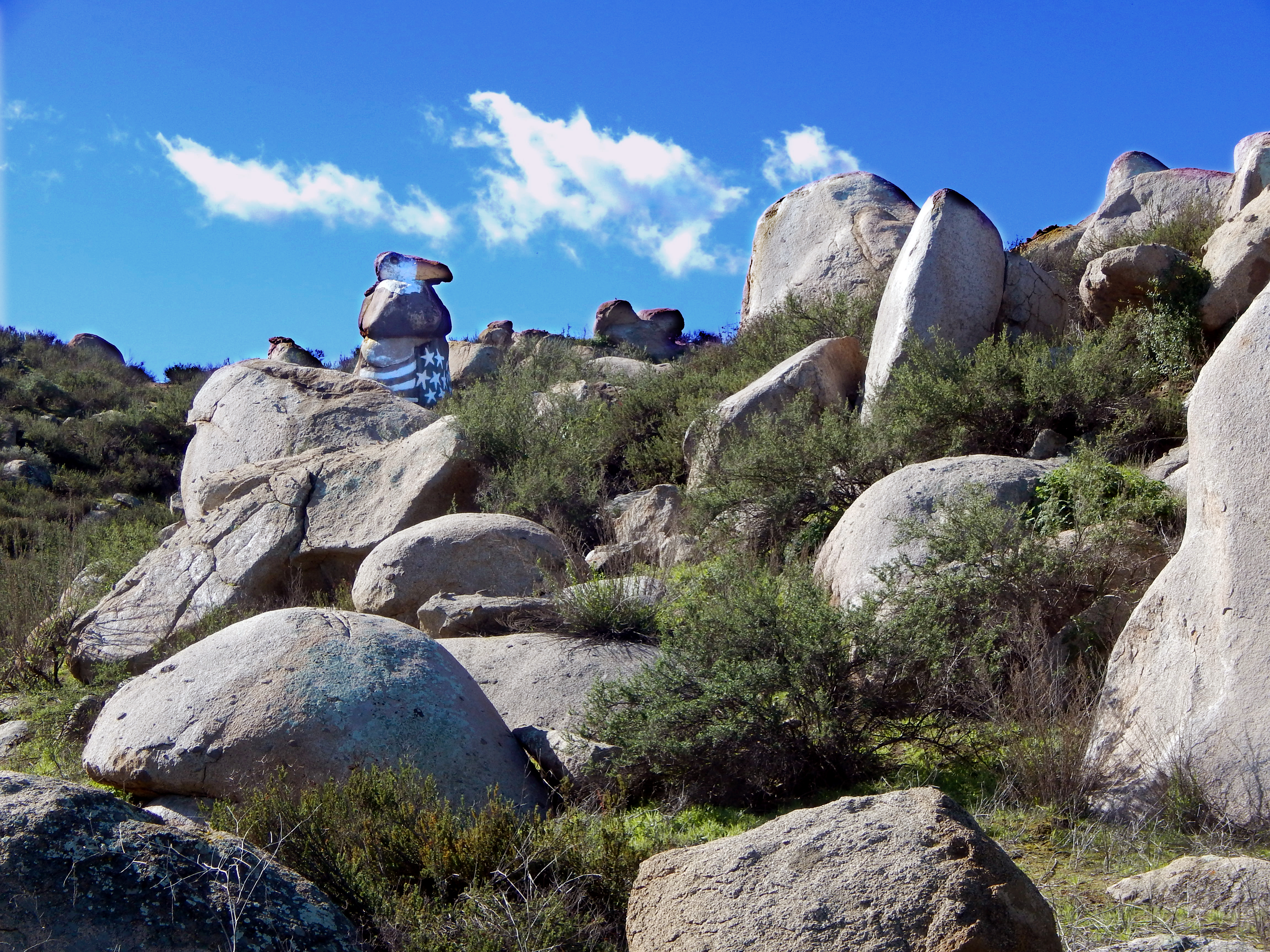
Menifee's Eagle Rock

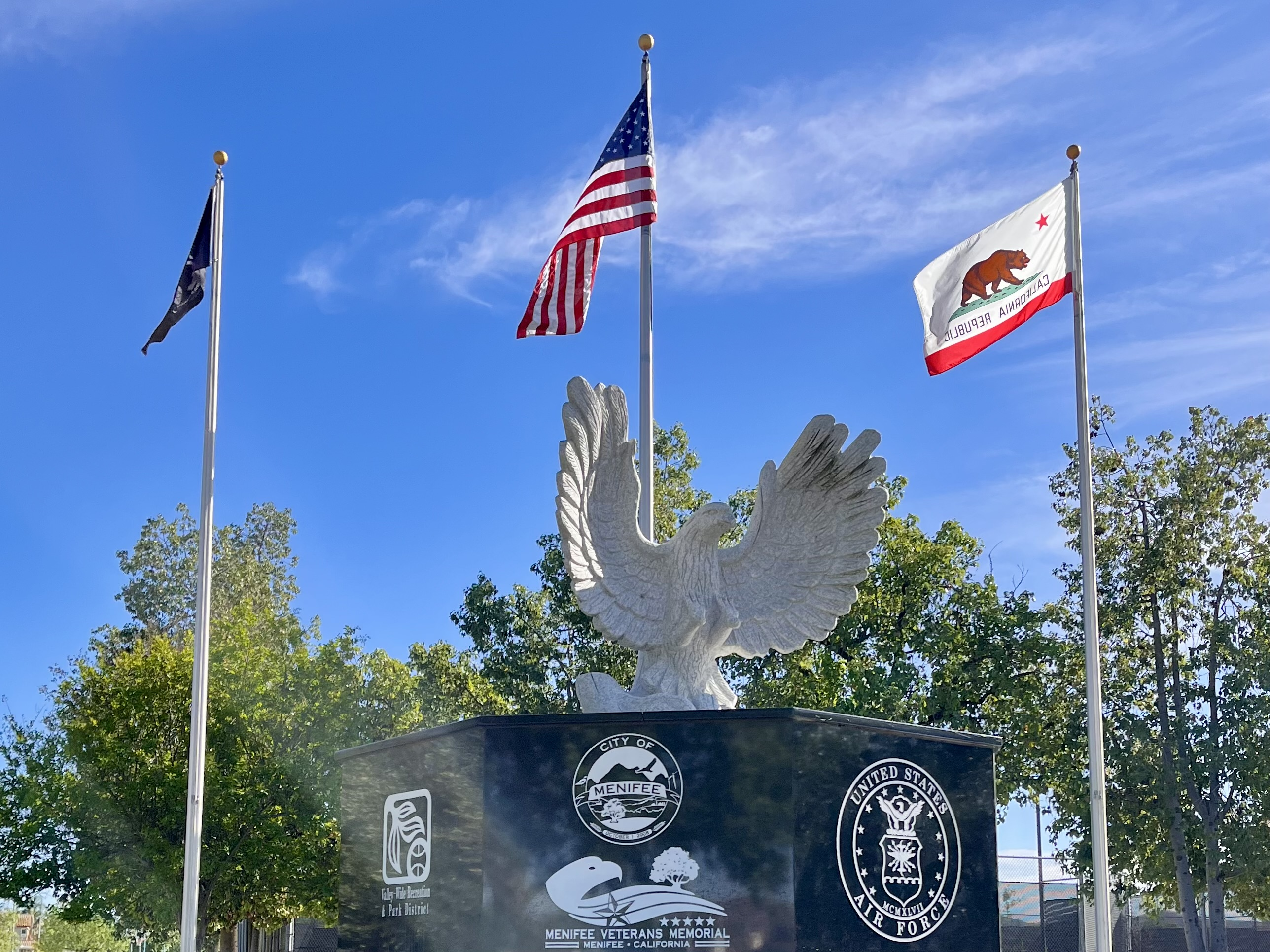
Menifee Veterans Memorial

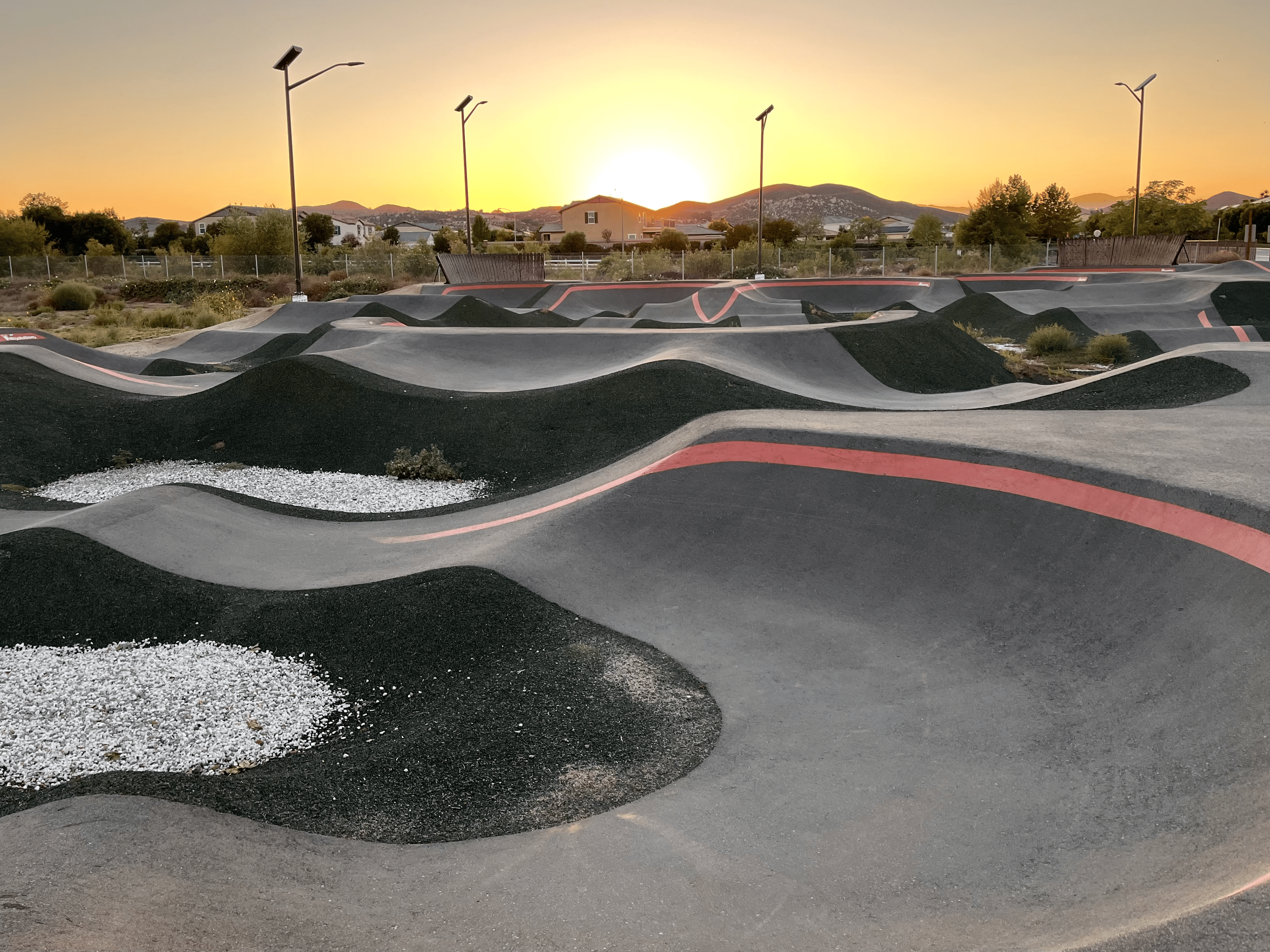
Gale Webb Action Sports Park

== Politics ==
Menifee presidential election results
Year	Democratic	Republican	Third Parties
2024	42.43% (22,823)	55.28% (29,734)	2.29% (1,232)
2020	43.57% (22,128)	54.71% (27,789)	1.72% (876)
2016	38.55% (13,410)	56.52% (19,659)	4.93% (1,715)
2012	40.21% (11,758)	58.04% (16,969)	1.75% (512)

As of October 2025, Menifee is a part of California's 41st congressional district, with Republican Ken Calvert serving as its representative. Following the passing of Proposition 50, Menifee was redistricted into California's 40th congressional district.

In the California State Assembly, Menifee lies within the 63rd district and is represented by Republican Natasha Johnson. In the California State Senate, it is part of the 32nd district and represented by Republican Kelly Seyarto.

In the Riverside County Board of Supervisors, Menifee falls within the 3rd District. Officially a non-partisan seat, it is represented by Democratic politician Chuck Washington.

Politically, Menifee is a Republican-leaning city. It has voted Republican in the past four presidential elections (Romney in 2012 and Trump in 2016, 2020, & 2024).

=== City government ===
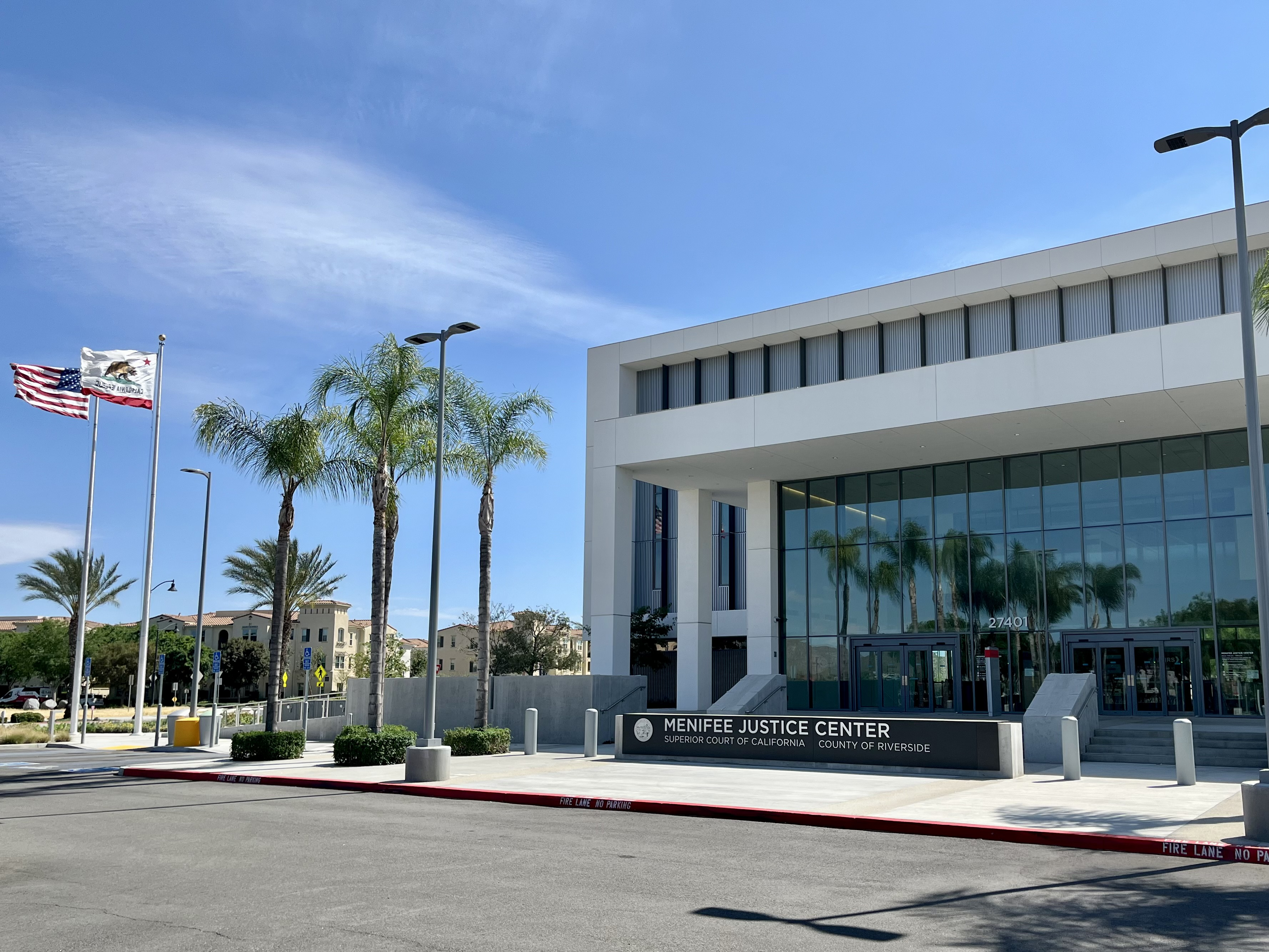
Menifee Justice Center - Superior Court of California, County of Riverside

On June 3, 2008, voters elected to incorporate Menifee as a general law city. The new City of Menifee was officially established on October 1, 2008, and is the 26th city located within Riverside County. It was first governed by a five-member city council, with Wallace Edgerton as the mayor. Edgerton was re-appointed mayor for a second term in 2009, and for a third term in 2010.

In 2011, John Denver was appointed mayor by city council, after the city's people requested a change in leadership at city council meetings.

In November 2012, Scott Mann was elected mayor; he was re-elected in November 2014. In 2016, Neil Winter was elected mayor, defeating Mann, who unsuccessfully ran for a third term. Mann's FPPC violation of using campaign funding for personal funding was believed to have helped Winter to win the election. Mann resigned office early after being formally censured by city council, and Greg August served as acting mayor for 20 days until Winter was sworn in. During the 2016 election, voters also approved a measure to increase mayoral terms from two to four years.

List of Mayors of Menifee
No.	Name	Term
1	Wallace Edgerton	1 Oct. 2008 - 4 Jan. 2012
2	John Denver	4 Jan. 2012 - 4 Dec. 2012
3	Scott Mann	4 Dec. 2012 - 17 Nov. 2016
Acting	Greg August	17 Nov. 2016 - 7 Dec. 2016
4	Neil Winter †	7 Dec. 2016 - 19 May 2018
Pro Tempore	Lesa Sobek	19 May 2018 - 18 July 2018
5	Bill Zimmerman	18 July 2018 - 17 Dec. 2024
6	Ricky Estrada	17 Dec. 2024 - Present

On May 19, 2018, Mayor Winter unexpectedly died in office, due to an apparent heart attack. Councilwoman Lesa Sobek took up mayoral responsibilities as mayor pro tempore following Winter's death. After 60 days, Bill Zimmerman was elected Mayor of Menifee in a 3-1 decision by the city council, on July 18, 2018. In November 2020, Zimmerman was re-elected to serve a four-year term as Mayor.

In November 2024, Ricky Estrada was elected mayor; and was sworn in on December 17. In August 2025, Estrada (a member of the U.S. Air Force Reserve) was called into a 6 month deployment; Mayoral Pro Tem Bob Karwin temporarily assumed mayoral duties in Estrada's absence, beginning October 2025. According to Menifee 24/7, Estrada's deployment represents only the fourth time in U.S. history where an active mayor was deployed during their term; the three previous cases involved Pete Buttigieg, Brent R. Taylor (KIA), and Jacob R. Day. In April 2026, Estrada returned to Menifee from his deployment, and resumed his duties as mayor.

=== Local policies ===
As of 2026, the city holds its annual Independence Day celebrations on the Saturday before July 4th. This practice has been in place for over 30 years, as a cost-cutting measure.

=== Voter registrations ===
As of February 2025, Menifee has 74,782 registered voters. Among these, Republicans hold the plurality of registrations.

Party	Registered voters	Percentage
American Independent	3,863	5.17%
Democratic	24,344	32.55%
Green	275	0.38%
Libertarian Party	938	1.25%
Peace and Freedom Party	345	0.46%
Republican	29,128	38.95%
No Party preference (Independent)	14,931	19.96%
Unknown/Other	958	1.28%

== Public Safety ==
In June 2019, the City of Menifee voted to end its contract with the Riverside County Sheriff's Department and create its own police department. The Menifee Police Department officially launched in July 2020. In the 2023–2024 fiscal year, the Menifee Police Department accounted for 23.3% of the city's budget ($27.5 million).

The City of Menifee contracts for fire and paramedic services with the Riverside County Fire Department through a cooperative agreement with CAL FIRE. There are four fire stations in Menifee and each station has a paramedic engine company, and there is one medic patrol unit out of Fire Station #7 to assist with call volumes, as Station #7 is the 10th-busiest station in the nation. The Menifee Lakes station also has a truck company located there with specialized equipment for large structural fires.

Paramedic services are provided by American Medical Response, whose South Riverside Headquarters are located in Menifee.

== Education ==
=== Schools ===
Menifee Valley campus of Mt. San Jacinto College

K-12 education in Menifee is primarily provided by the Menifee Union School District, the Romoland School District, and the Perris Union High School District in separate sections. These unions oversee multiple schools in the city, including Paloma Valley High School and Heritage High School.

In addition to Menifee, these districts also serve nearby parts of Lake Elsinore, Wildomar, Murrieta, and French Valley.

Separate from the public school districts, Menifee possesses two charter schools, Santa Rosa Academy and the Bear River Student Center.

Menifee is also home to the Menifee Valley Campus of Mt. San Jacinto College, a public community college. The Menifee Valley Campus is one of four that the college possesses; the three additional campuses are located in the nearby cities of San Jacinto, Banning, and Temecula.

=== Libraries ===
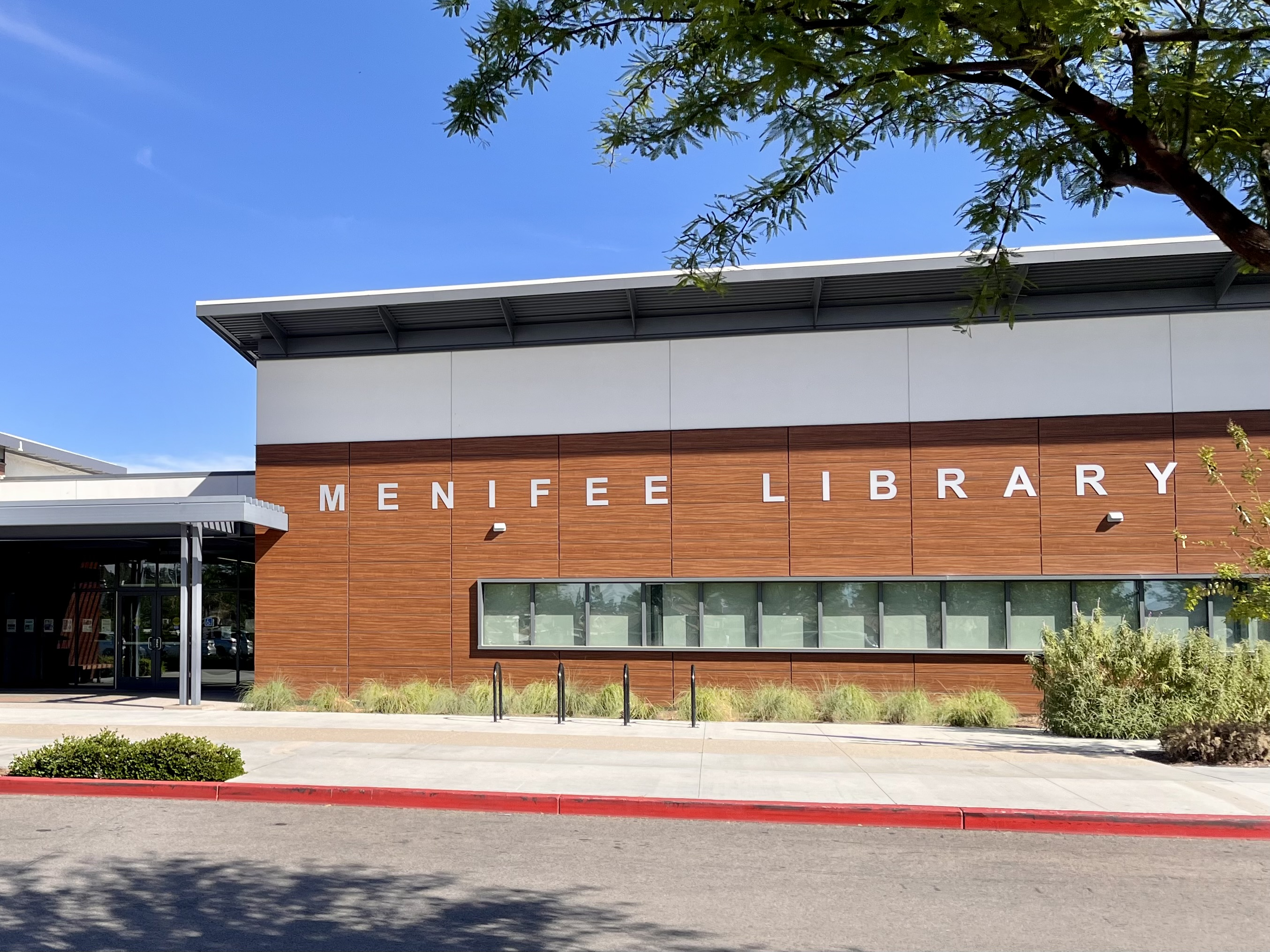
Menifee Public Library

Menifee is home to two major libraries within the Riverside County Library System, the Sun City Library and the Menifee Public Library.

Before Menifee's 2008 incorporation, the Sun City Library originated as a bookmobile for local seniors in 1962. By 1965, the county leased a 1,100 sq ft building to serve as the first permanent library. The Sun City library was expanded three times by 1990, before moving locations to a larger space in 1994. In 2010, the current Sun City Library was re-opened in its current form, on the 1994 lot. Since 2010, the Sun City Library now stands at roughly 11,000² ft large.

The Menifee Public Library was first opened in July 2021 by Mayor Zimmerman; it is 20,000² ft large.

== Infrastructure ==
=== Transportation ===
==== Roads and highways ====
The primary routes in Menifee are Interstate 215 and Newport Road/Dominegoni Parkway. Scott Road, McCall Boulevard and Ethanac Road are also primary east–west travel streets in addition to State Route 74, which runs through the northern part of the city; Murrieta, Bradley, Haun, Antelope, and Menifee Roads are the main north–south thoroughfares. Improvements to the interchange at I-215 and Scott Road were completed in 2020. Other road improvements, such as a new interchange at Garbani Road, are anticipated in the coming years.

==== Public transportation ====
Menifee has bus routes and Dial-A-Ride stops throughout the city to enhance mobility. RTA Routes 27, 40, 61, and 74 directly serve the Menifee area, linking it to other nearby cities including Temecula, Lake Elsinore, Hemet, and San Jacinto. Metrolink serves the area via the 91/Perris Valley Line, which ends at the South Perris Station, just north of the Menifee city limits. Metrolink has proposed an extension along existing railroad tracks through the northeastern corner of the city to Hemet, though it is unknown whether there will be a station in Menifee.

=== Health care ===
Emergency medical services in Menifee are provided by the 84-bed Menifee Global Medical Center, which is a licensed acute care hospital. It opened in 1989 and is located on McCall Boulevard in the northeastern part of the city.

=== Water ===
The city is provided water by the Eastern Municipal Water District. A desalination plant in the city treats underground water to produce drinking water.

== Notable people ==
- Tony Burton, actor
- Larry Fortensky, construction worker and seventh husband of Elizabeth Taylor
- Fernando Gonzalez, MMA fighter
- Steve Lamson, motocross racer
- Phyllis Love, actress
- Benny Mardones, singer
- Mike Metzger, motocross rider
- Jamal Morrow, football player
- Audie Murphy, soldier, actor, and songwriter
- Matthew Orzech, football player
- Nia Sanchez, fashion model and Miss USA 2014
- Ally Beardsley, actor and comedian
