= Heritage High School (Romoland, California) =

Public high school in California, United States

Coordinates: 33°44′27″N 117°08′18″W

Location
- 26001 Briggs Road; Menifee, Riverside County, California 92585; United States

Information
- Type: Public
- Established: August 8, 2007
- Teaching staff: 102.43 (FTE)
- Grades: 9-12
- Enrollment: 2,326 (2023-2024)
- Student to teacher ratio: 22.71
- Colors: Red, white, and blue
- Athletics conference: CIF Southern Section; Sunbelt League
- Mascot: Patriot
- Website: Heritage High School

Heritage High School is a public four-year high school in the Romoland area of the city of Menifee, California. It is part of the Perris Union High School District. Its first school year began on August 8, 2007, with freshmen and sophomores in attendance. It is primarily fed to by students from the Romoland and Nuview school districts, though some students from the Menifee Union School District also attend.
