= Quail Valley Elementary School =

Quail Valley Elementary School can refer to:

- Quail Valley Elementary School, Menifee Union School District, Menifee, California
- Quail Valley Elementary School, Palmdale School District, Palmdale, California
- Quail Valley Elementary School, Fort Bend Independent School District, Missouri City, Texas
