= Sunbelt League =

High school athletic league in California, US

The Sunbelt League is a high school athletic league that is part of the Raincross Conference in the CIF Southern Section. Members are located in the cities of Riverside, Moreno Valley, Menifee, Perris, Wildomar and Lake Elsinore, California. The Sunbelt League comprises the second-tier teams from the Raincross Conference and its membership differs for each sport.

== Members ==
- Elsinore High School (Football, Boys Basketball, Baseball, Softball, Stunt Cheer)
- Heritage High School (Girls Golf, Boys Basketball, Wrestling-Individual, Softball, Swim, Stunt Cheer)
- Lakeside High School (Girls Golf, Boys Water Polo, Boys Basketball, Wrestling-Team, Wrestling-Individual, Baseball, Softball, Swim, Boys Volleyball, Stunt Cheer)
- Paloma Valley High School (Wrestling-Individual, Swim)
- Perris High School (Boys Basketball, Wrestling-Individual, Baseball, Softball, Stunt Cheer)
- Temescal Canyon High School (Football, Boys Volleyball, Stunt Cheer)
- Arlington High School (Football, Girls Golf, Boys Basketball, Wrestling-Team, Softball, Boys Volleyball)
- John W. North High School (Girls Golf, Boys Water Polo, Wrestling-Team, Swim, Boys Volleyball)
- Riverside Polytechnic High School (Wrestling-Team, Wrestling-Individual)
- Notre Dame High School (Football, Boys Water Polo, Baseball, Softball, Girls Tennis, Boys Tennis)
- Valley View High School (Girls Golf, Boys Water Polo, Wrestling-Individual, Boys Volleyball)
- Canyon Springs High School (Boys Basketball, Wrestling-Individual, Boys Volleyball)
- Rancho Verde High School (Wrestling-Team, Baseball, Softball, Boys Volleyball, Boys Soccer)
- Orange Vista High School (Boys Basketball, Baseball, Softball, Boys Volleyball, Stunt Cheer)
- Rubidoux High School ( All Sports )
