= Butterfield Elementary School (Lake Elsinore, California) =

Coordinates: 33.6506°N 117.366°W

Location
- 16275 Grand Ave. Riverside County, California; Lake Elsinore, California 92530; United States

Information
- Type: Public
- Opened: 1982
- Closed: 2010
- School district: Lake Elsinore Unified School District
- Specialist: Visual and Performing Arts Magnet
- Principal: Last principal, Dorri Neal
- Grades: Was Kindergarten – Fifth Grade
- Enrollment: 950
- Color: Black/Turquoise
- Nickname: Bobcats
- Feeder to: Lakeland Village Middle School
- High School: Lakeside High School
- District website: http://www.leusd.k12.ca.us
- Website: Official website

Butterfield Elementary School was a publicly funded elementary school within the Lake Elsinore Unified School District in Lake Elsinore, California, United States. Named after the historic Butterfield Overland Stage route passing in front of the school, Butterfield Elementary was known for its innovative educational programs, particularly in the arts. In 1995, it hosted Riverside County's first Elementary Visual and Performing Arts (VAPA) Magnet School Program, which was previously located at Elsinore Elementary School. Riverside County's second VAPA program began in 1991 at the Butterfield School of the Arts in Moreno Valley.

Butterfield Elementary received numerous grants and awards in the performing arts, and its students performed alongside groups such as The Young Americans and actor Mark Wahlberg. The school closed on June 3, 2010, after 28 years of operation. Students and staff moved to the nearby Lakeland Village Middle School campus, which was renamed Lakeland Village School and reorganized as a K–8 institution. The school's legacy was preserved through the naming of the auditorium as the Butterfield Performing Arts Center.

In 2014, plans were proposed to rebuild Butterfield Elementary by Fall 2016. However, after feasibility studies revealed high costs and the need for seismic retrofitting, the reconstruction plan was canceled.

The former school site was later converted into the Lakeland Village Community Center, which officially opened on June 11, 2016. Renovations included converting the school library into a fitness and dance room, transforming staff areas into arts and crafts spaces, and upgrading accessibility features such as a wheelchair lift for the multipurpose room stage.

== History ==
The school was named in commemoration of the Butterfield Overland Stage route, a 19th-century mail service that passed through what is now Grand Avenue in Lake Elsinore. The trail played a significant role in the region’s development and mail delivery until 1862. Butterfield Elementary opened in fall 1982 with 482 K–6 students and Frank Evans as its founding principal.

Located near historical education sites like the former Grand School (built in 1884), Butterfield was Lake Elsinore’s fourth elementary school at the time of its construction. It became part of a growing district that now includes over a dozen elementary or K–8 schools. As a magnet school, Butterfield attracted students district-wide, many of whom continued their education at Lakeland Village School and Lakeside High School.

Butterfield adapted to changes in enrollment by operating on a double session schedule between 1985 and 1988 and later returned to a traditional format following the opening of new schools. In 1989, the Elsinore Union High School District merged with the local elementary district to form the Lake Elsinore Unified School District.

The school participated in key district-wide initiatives, such as the VAPA magnet program and California’s Class Size Reduction initiative in the late 1990s. From 1991 to 2002, Butterfield operated on a year-round schedule before transitioning back to a traditional academic calendar.

Modernization efforts in 2005 upgraded school facilities, including HVAC, electrical systems, and furnishings. Despite these improvements, budget considerations and seismic concerns led to the school’s closure in 2010. Students and staff relocated to the Lakeland Village School campus, maintaining continuity under a new institutional name.

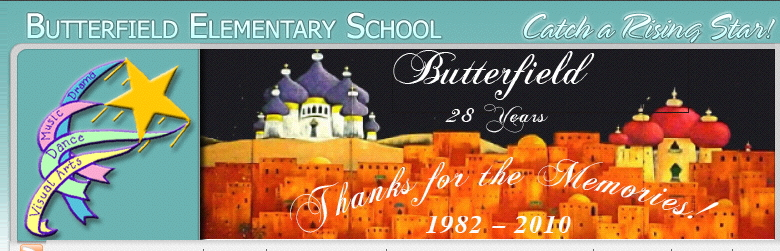

A community farewell event, "Celebrate Butterfield," was held in May 2010, and the final school musical took place in June of that year. In its final year, Butterfield achieved a notable 76-point increase in its Academic Performance Index (API), reflecting significant academic growth.

== Renaissance cancelled ==
Plans to reconstruct Butterfield Elementary were officially abandoned in 2014 due to high costs and seismic safety concerns. While initial proposals aimed to reopen parts of the campus for primary grades by 2015 and expand to full capacity by 2016, the school district concluded that renovation was financially unfeasible. As a result, the idea of a "Butterfield Renaissance" was discontinued.

== Mission and vision ==
Butterfield Elementary School's mission was to provide a safe, inclusive, and challenging educational environment to support the academic and personal development of its diverse student population. Instruction was guided by qualified staff in alignment with the No Child Left Behind Act (NCLB).

The school’s vision emphasized academic excellence based on California State Standards, student participation in arts and athletics, and collaboration among educators, families, and the community. Butterfield promoted the unique contribution of every student and staff member in achieving educational success.

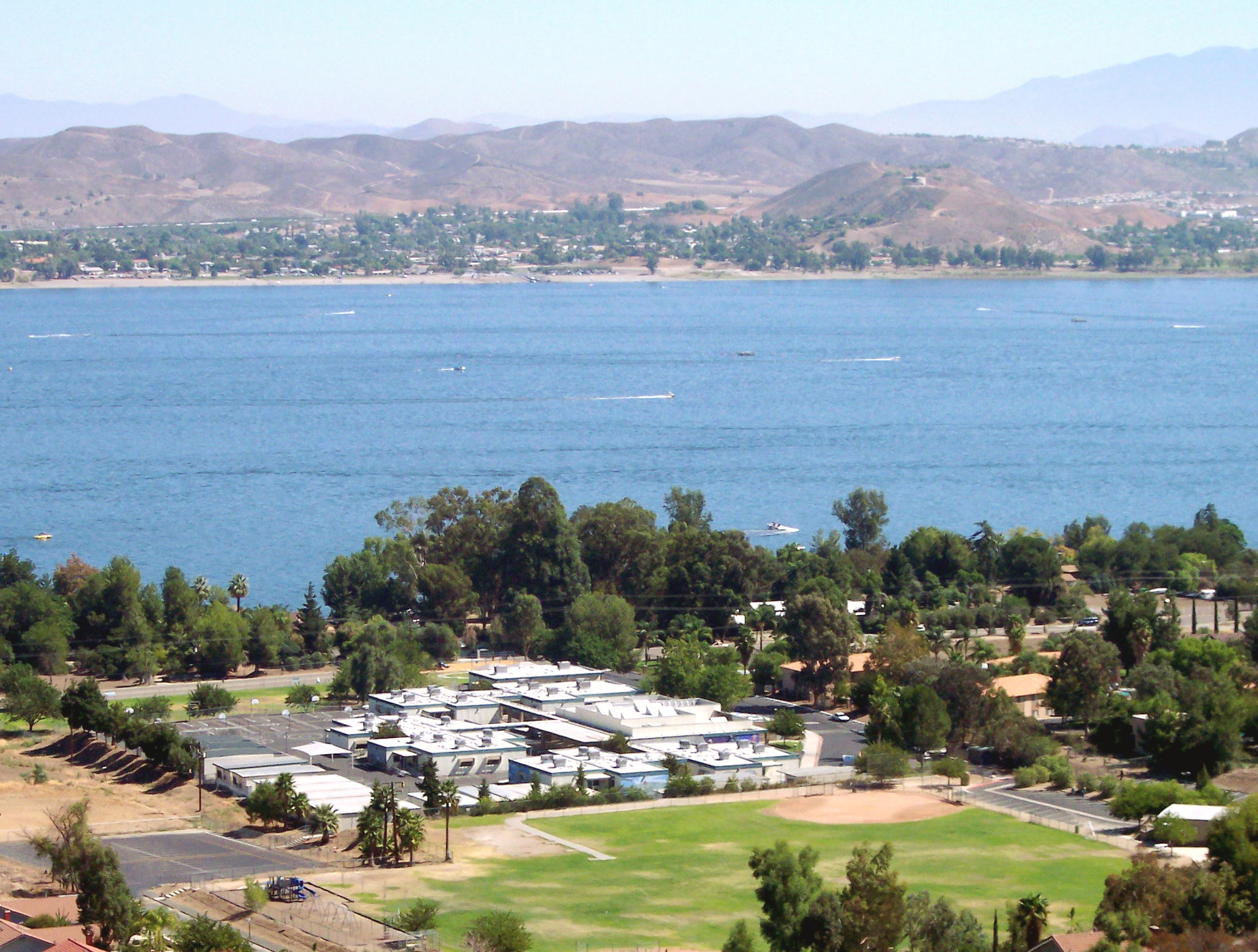
Butterfield Elementary School from Calif. Hwy. 74 (Ortega Highway) behind school

== Facilities and resources ==
The school had 45 classrooms serving kindergarten through fifth grade, with an enrollment of approximately 850 students. It also hosted 'First 5 California' and SDC state preschool classes, both morning and afternoon sessions, as well as a no-cost on-site Think Together after-school program. Local daycare services provided additional support, including transportation and extended care.

Butterfield’s library housed over 15,000 books and included a computer mini-lab with ten Macintosh eMacs for research. The school’s multipurpose room was equipped with professional-grade sound and lighting systems for student performances and events. The campus also featured BESTv, a green-screen video production studio used for classroom plays, school-wide performances, and literacy activities.

Technology facilities included a lab with 33 Thin-client PCs and a mobile cart with 16 Apple iBooks. A Title I classroom was equipped with six additional PCs for individual instruction. Classrooms typically included a laptop, video projector, at least one eMac computer, and a document camera. Each room had internet connectivity and a telephone line for staff communication.

== School climate and educational programs ==
Butterfield fostered an inclusive and supportive school environment, aligned with district priorities emphasizing student development. Collaboration among staff, parents, and students was encouraged to shape programs and school culture.

The school implemented a variety of academic and enrichment programs. These included artist-in-residence initiatives, dedicated art and music labs, and video production using a green-screen studio. Literacy and reading support was provided through programs such as SRA, Fast Track, Accelerated Reader, and STAR literacy groups. Other specialized interventions included Barton dyslexia tutoring, Lindamood Phoneme Sequencing (LiPS), and transitional classrooms.

Gifted and Talented Education (GATE) programs, after-school intervention classes, and specialized combination classes expanded learning opportunities. Butterfield also hosted two Resource Specialist Program (RSP) classrooms and a dedicated special education class. Core curricula included Hampton-Brown Avenues for English learners, Houghton-Mifflin Reading, and enVision Mathematics. Educators at Butterfield were supported in collaborative curriculum planning under state and district guidelines.

== Visual and performing arts program ==
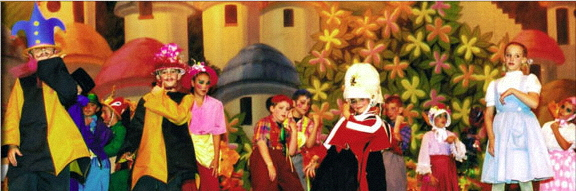
2001 Performance of The Wizard of Oz

Butterfield became a Visual and Performing Arts (VAPA) magnet school in 1995 following the relocation of the program from Elsinore Elementary. All students, regardless of grade level, participated in VAPA activities. Until 2007, Butterfield was Riverside County’s only elementary arts magnet school, and it remained the only program serving Kindergarten through 5th grade until its closure in 2010.

The school hosted an artist-in-residence for music and drama, and also employed a part-time art teacher and a shared band instructor. Over the years, students performed in twelve major

== Honors, awards and grants ==
Butterfield Elementary received several prestigious honors, including the Golden Bell award from the California School Boards Association for its arts programming. The school was also a finalist for the Los Angeles Music Center's BRAVO Award, with teachers Monique Poldberg and Barbara Egbert receiving individual recognition.

Grant funding supported a wide range of educational initiatives. Notable examples include a Toyota Tapestry Grant for the second-grade team, a federal ArtsLINC grant focused on literacy and the arts, and a SEISMIC math grant through California State University, San Marcos. Additional funding included a five-year Healthy Start grant, a California State Technology Grant used to establish the BESTv video lab, and grants supporting American history

== Student ethnicity ==
Butterfield's ethnicity, and comparisons to the district and state averages, are as follows:

Response	School percentage - for its last year (2009/10)	District percentage	State average
Hispanic:	59%	50%	48%
White:	31%	38%	29%
African American:	4%	5%	8%
Asian:	1%	2%	8%
Filipino:	1%	2%	3%
Multiple/no response:	2%	2%	3%
Pacific Islander:	<1%	<1%	<1%
American Indian:	<1%	<1%	<1%

== Principals ==
Dates	Principal
1982 to 1985	Frank Evans
1985 to 1988	Colleen Andersen
1988 to 1992	Cheryl Eining
1992 to 2010	Dorri Neal
