= Paloma Valley High School =

High school in Menifee, California, United States

Location
- 31375 Bradley Road; Menifee, California 92584; United States; 33°39′53″N 117°11′24″W

Information
- Type: Public
- Established: September 7, 1995
- School district: Perris Union High School District
- Principal: Thomas LaRochelle
- Staff: 108.15 (FTE)
- Grades: 9–12
- Enrollment: 2,593 (2023-2024)
- Student to teacher ratio: 23.98
- Color: Maroon
- Athletics conference: CIF Southern Section; Sunbelt League
- Mascot: Wildcat
- Website: Paloma Valley High School

Paloma Valley High School is a public four-year high school located in Menifee, California. The school is part of the Perris Union High School District. It opened for its first school year on September 7, 1995. Students have the opportunity to take Advanced Placement coursework and exams. The AP participation rate at Paloma Valley High School is 35 percent. The student body makeup is 51 percent male and 49 percent female, and the total minority enrollment is 65 percent.

== Curriculum ==
=== 2014 academic indicators ===
- National Rank: #1,736
- College Readiness Index: 21.9
- Academic Performance Index: 815
- Student/Teacher Ratio: 29:1

Wildcat Formal Exchange

== Homophobic allegations ==
On March 2, 2011, it was reported that a teacher at Paloma Valley High School allegedly wrote an 'S' on a lesbian student's hand and repeatedly referred to the student as a "sinner" throughout class. The student reported the alleged incident against the teacher on October 14, but the teacher has only recently been "dealt with" according to Leslie Ventuleth, the Riverside County School District’s chief human resources officer. As of Oct. 29, 2015, the identities of the student and the teacher have yet to be released.

"Teachers and students say that even though they have complained, the district has refused to do anything about it."

The school's Gay Straight Alliance was forbidden last fall from sharing information about Gay, Lesbian, Bisexual and Transgender History Month during school announcements. Paloma Valley's vice president of the Gay Straight Alliance (Knox Morris) had proposed the idea. He hoped to share information during announcements about prominent gay people. He said his proposal was rejected, and that he was told such announcements weren't allowed for any history month. Later, during Black History Month in February, the Black Student Union made announcements similar to those proposed by the Gay Straight Alliance. He continued and was one of several students who complained to Perris Union school board members last month. "I'm frustrated that my school would do something like this," he said at the meeting.

== Notable alumni ==
- Nia Sanchez, winner of Miss USA 2014
- Matt Orzech, long snapper for the Green Bay Packers
- Mark Holcomb, guitarist in the djent/metal band Periphery
