= Temescal Canyon High School =

Public high school in California, United States

Location
- 28755 El Toro Rd; Lake Elsinore, California 92532; United States; 33°42′12″N 117°20′54″W

Information
- Type: public high school
- Motto: Setting the Standard for Excellence
- Established: 1991
- School district: Lake Elsinore Unified School District
- Principal: Joshua Hill
- Staff: 89.28 (FTE)
- Grades: 9-12
- Enrollment: 2,248 (2023-2024)
- Student to teacher ratio: 25.18
- Color
- Athletics conference: CIF Southern Section; Sunbelt League
- Mascot: Titan

Temescal Canyon High School is a public high school part of the Lake Elsinore Unified School District. Though it is located in Lake Elsinore, California, it also serves the areas of Canyon Lake and Horsethief Canyon. The school was opened for the 1991–1992 school year, graduating its first class in 1994.

== School layout ==
Temescal Canyon is divided into buildings labeled as "hundred"—four hundred, five hundred, etc.—and includes portable classrooms and permanent structures. The school was partially completed when it opened, but was finished in 1999.

=== "Hundred" Buildings ===
Built on what once were basketball courts, the 400 building houses numerous types of classes such as math and music appreciation. The 450 building, located on the west side of the school, houses computer labs used for freshman foundation instruction, computer classes, and English Language Development classes. The 500 building, between the 550 and 700 buildings, includes a small set of four science classrooms. The 550 building is one of the campus' two story buildings, and is the site of English, social sciences and science classes.

The school's hub, the 600 building, is one of the original structures. It houses the library, media center and history and English classrooms. The math building–the 700–is also known as the Kathy Paap. The second two-story building on campus serves elective classes (such as ceramics, pottery and photography) and foreign language instruction. The 900 building, nestled in the back of the campus, also houses elective instruction, including materials labs, a TV studio and an auto shop.

The school plant includes two gymnasia, the old Small Gym and the newer Big Gym, which was completed in 1999. The small gym is mainly used for indoor physical education and dances and is connected to the school cafeteria and the school kitchen. The Big Gym, also known as Thunderdome, is primarily used for sports like basketball and volleyball; it also houses school assemblies and pep rallies. The letters T-C-H-S are spelled out on the gym bleachers.

The school has a set of three athletic fields. The softball and baseball fields are located at the northwest corner of the campus. The soccer field is located below the Big Gym, and fills the space between the baseball and football stadiums. The football stadium is located on the southwest corner of the school campus, and has been renovated with new viewing stands and synthetic turf.

The administration building includes the bookkeeping office, athletic director, counseling office, career center and administrative offices usually off-limits for students.

There are three parking lots, two of which are restricted for students. One is located near the 800, but the largest one is near the campus stadium, and includes spaces for office personnel and spaces reserved for seniors. These spots are randomly assigned to a certain number of seniors in a lottery-style choosing. Students who obtain these spaces must pay an extra fee but are given a special decal and are able to paint their spaces on senior paint-party day. The rest of the staff park in the lot behind the 900, which students are not allowed to use.

Students have numerous places to gather during break and lunch. Due to the layout of the school, quads are formed in between the buildings. The "Senior Quad" is elevated above the walkways in the northwest corner of the 600 building and includes a tarp. The "Freshman Quad" is located right outside of the lunchroom and includes a tarp. Less busy quads are those formed at the 550 and 800 buildings.

== Sports ==
=== Fall Season (September–November) ===
- Football
- Marching band
- Girls' volleyball
- Cross country
- Girls' golf
- Girls' tennis
- Boys' water polo

=== Winter Season (December–February) ===
- Girls' water polo
- Boys' basketball
- Girls' basketball
- Girls' soccer
- Boys' soccer
- Wrestling

=== Spring Season (March–May) ===
- Boys' golf
- Baseball
- Softball
- Boys' track and field
- Girls' track and field
- Boys' swimming
- Girls' swimming
- Boys' tennis

== Notable alumni ==
- Tom Malone (1998–2002), punter for the USC Trojans and the St. Louis Rams
- Norman Xiong (2014-2017), professional golfer
