= Elsinore High School =

Location
- 21800 Canyon Dr. Wildomar, California 92595; United States; 33.6233°N 117.2797°W

Information
- Type: Public high school
- Motto: Tradition. Caring. Respect.
- School district: Lake Elsinore Unified School District
- Principal: Robbin Hamilton and Sarah Arredondo
- Teaching staff: 87.89 (FTE)
- Grades: 9–12
- Enrollment: 2,065 (2023-2024)
- Student to teacher ratio: 23.50
- Color
- Athletics conference: CIF Southern Section; Sunbelt League
- Mascot: Tiger
- Website: ehs.leusd.k12.ca.us

Elsinore High School is a public high school located in Wildomar, California. It was founded in 1891 and is one of the oldest schools in Riverside County. The campus is visible from the Interstate 15 freeway.

The school is a California Distinguished School, an AVID National Demonstration School, and a Riverside County High School Model of Excellence for their Special Education and Peer Counseling programs.

== Student body ==
The student body includes around 400 to 600 students in each grade or class in the 2022-23 school year:

- Freshmen: 574
- Sophomores: 591
- Junior: 562
- Senior: 396

== Clubs ==
Active clubs at the school include Academic Decathlon, ASB, AVID, cheerleading, dance, drama, Model United Nations, Relay For Life, and Solar Cup.

== Sports ==
The school engages in a large number of sports including baseball, basketball, cheerleading, cross country running, football, golf, soccer, softball, swimming, tennis, track and field, volleyball, water polo, and wrestling.

== Notable alumni ==
- Dane De La Rosa, Major League Baseball player
- Kodi Lee, America's Got Talent Winner and 1st Golden Buzzer, 2019
- Erron Maxey, basketball player
- Ryan Ochoa, Disney actor, singer
- Jim Scranton, MLB baseball player
