= Bell Mountain (Riverside County, California) =

Mountain in Riverside County, California, United States

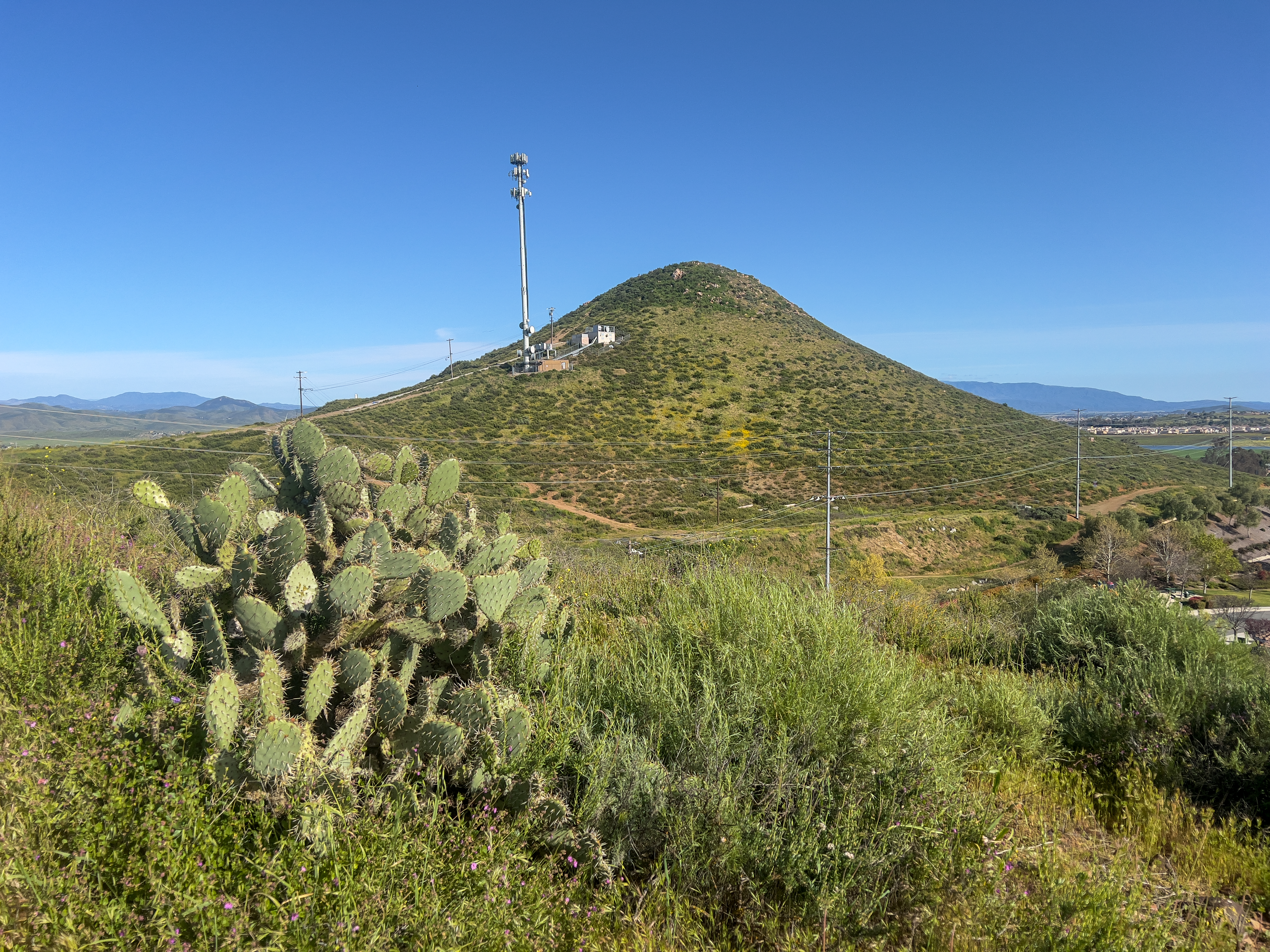
- Bell Mountain and tower

Highest point
- Elevation: 1,848 ft (563 m) NGVD 29
- Prominence: 363 ft (111 m)
- Coordinates: 33°39′32″N 117°09′07″W

Geography
- Location within California
- Location: Riverside County, California, U.S.
- Topo map: USGS Romoland

Bell Mountain is a mountain in the Paloma Valley in Menifee in Riverside County, California.
