= Margaret Collier Graham =

Short story writer of the 20th century

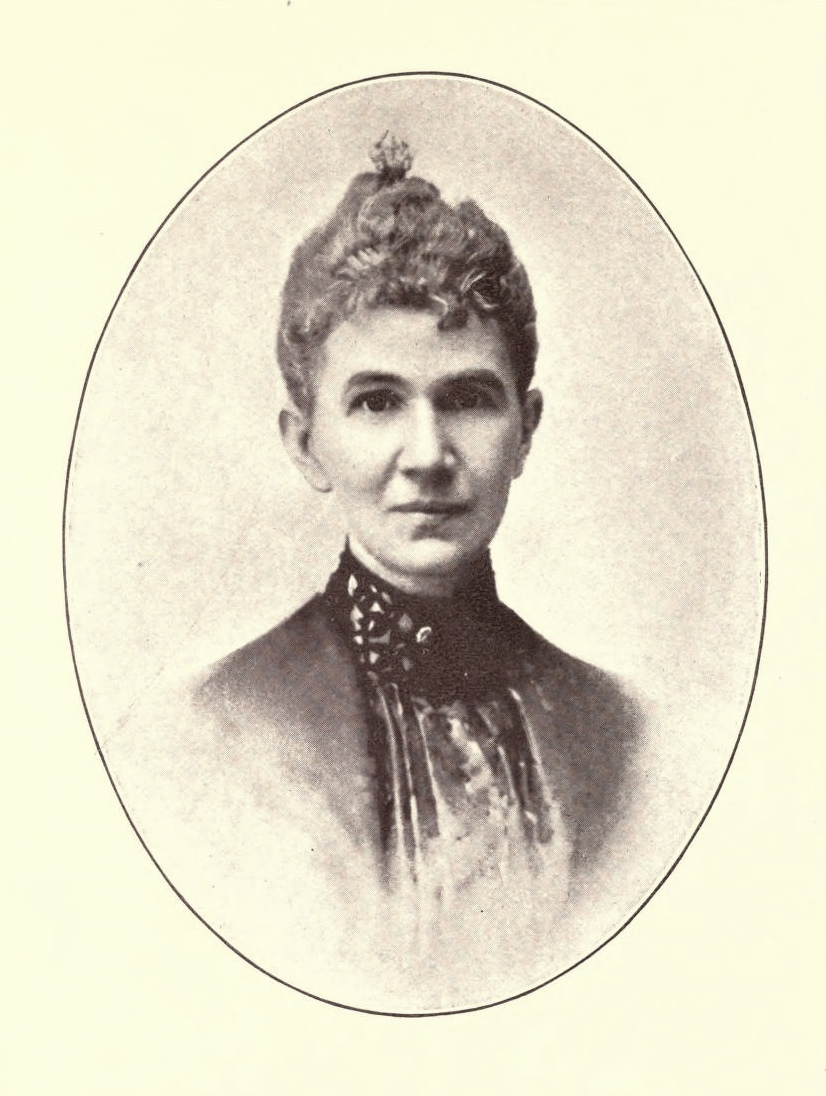
- Born: Margaret Collier; September 29, 1850; Van Buren County, Iowa, United States
- Died: 17 January 1910 (aged 59); Pasadena, California, United States
- Years active: 1890-1910

Margaret Collier Graham (September 29, 1850 – January 17, 1910) was a short story writer in southern California at the beginning of the 20th century.

== Early life, education and marriage ==
Margaret Collier grew up in Keokuk, Iowa. She had two sisters and a brother. In 1869, she graduated from Monmouth College (Illinois), where she had been active in its literary society. After teaching for three years in Oskaloosa, Iowa, she married Donald McIntyre Graham whom she had known at college. She settled with her husband, a young attorney, in Bloomingdale, Illinois, where they worked in an abstract of title business. When Donald contracted tuberculosis, the Grahams and Margaret's sister Jennie Collier moved to Pasadena after brief stays in San Francisco and Anaheim.

== Career in Pasadena ==
Once in Pasadena, Margaret took a teaching job and began writing stories for The Argonaut and The Californian. In 1881, she took a two-month leave of absence to meet travel to Oakland where she met publishers, wrote stories and became acquainted with historian Theodore Hittell and poet Ina Coolbirth. The Grahams and Margaret's brother Will Collier invested successfully in property near Lake Elsinore north east of San Diego, establishing the town of Wildomar in 1885. Financially secure, the Grahams built Wynyate, a three-story mansion in South Pasadena where they entertained the literary and civic leaders of the area. Donald became mayor of South Pasadena in 1888. Margaret and Jennie established the South Pasadena Lyceum, a precursor of the South Pasadena Public Library, in 1889. In 1890, Donald died of tuberculosis.

== Later life ==
Margaret Graham resumed writing in 1892 publishing striking short stories set in the American West in the Atlantic Monthly and Century Magazine. Her first collection of short stories was published by Houghton, Mifflin in 1895 as Stories of the Foot-hills. Active in the intellectual and political scene, she was a popular speaker and worked for women's suffrage through the Woman's Parliament of Southern California and for the preservation of California missions through Charles Lummis' Landmarks Club. She was a monthly columnist in Lummis' magazine Land of Sunshine. Her second collection of short stories, The Wizard's Daughter and Other Stories was published in 1905, again by Houghton Mifflin. Graham died in 1910 at the age of 60.
