= Wynyate =

Historic house in California, United States

- U.S. National Register of Historic Places
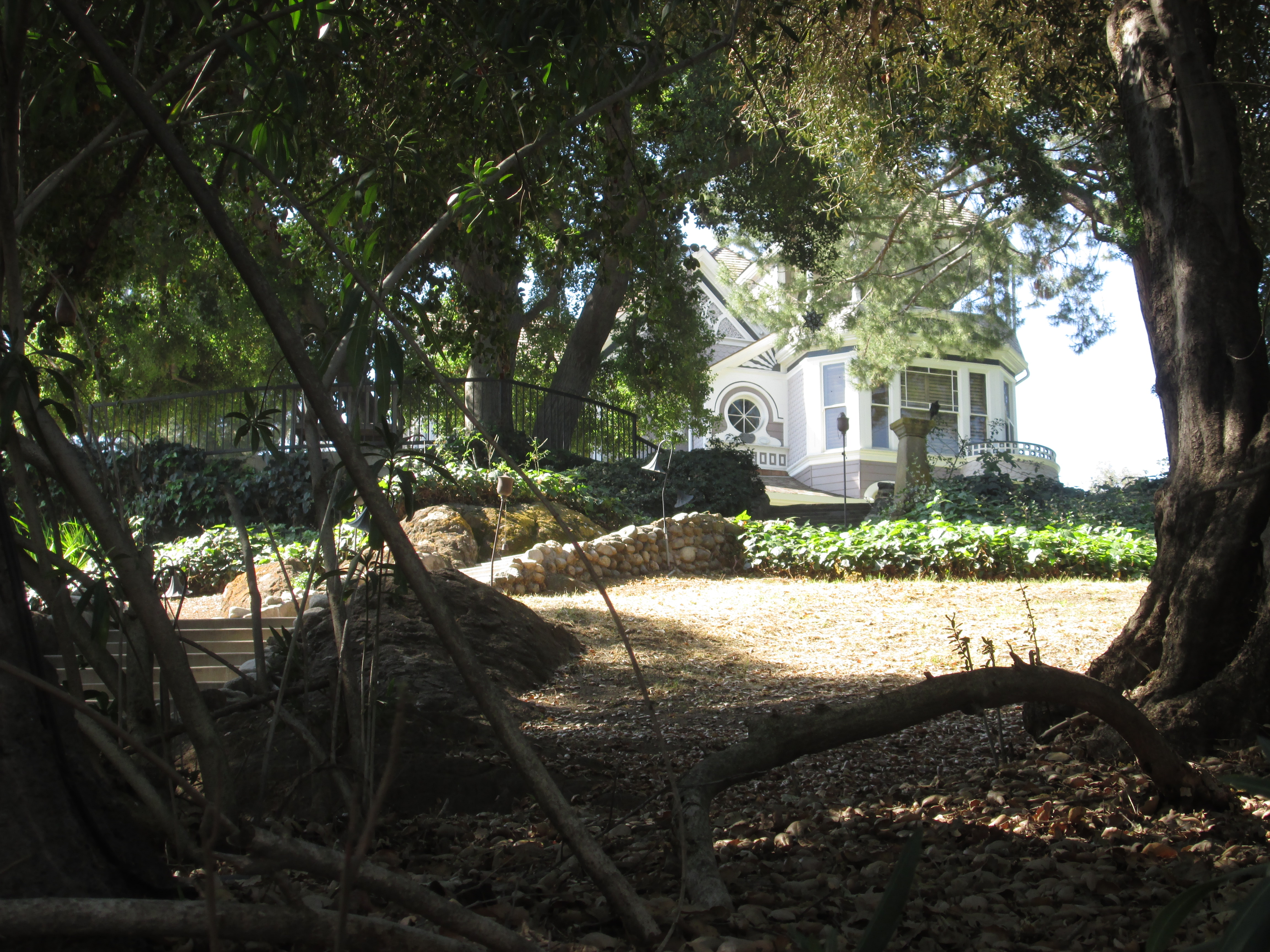
- Wynyate in 2015

- Location within California Location within the United States
- Location: 851 Lyndon Street, South Pasadena, California
- Coordinates: 34°6′39″N 118°9′28″W
- Area: 2 acres (0.81 ha)
- Built: 1887; 139 years ago
- Architectural style: Late Victorian
- NRHP reference No.: 73000407
- Added to NRHP: April 24, 1973

Wynyate is a historic house in South Pasadena, California, U.S.. It was built circa 1887 for Donald M. Graham, the first mayor of Pasadena, and his wife, author Margaret Collier Graham. It was designed in the Victorian architectural style. Authors Mary Hunter Austin and Charles Fletcher Lummis were frequent guests, as was John Muir, who planted a eucalyptus tree in the garden in 1889. The house has been listed on the National Register of Historic Places since April 24, 1973.
