= Lake Elsinore Unified School District =

Public school district in Riverside County, California

Address
- 545 Chaney Street Lake Elsinore, Riverside County, California; United States

District information
- Type: Public
- Motto: "A Culture of Learning and Success!"
- Grades: K–12
- Superintendent: Dr. Ryan Lewis
- NCES District ID: 0600027

Students and staff
- Students: 20,769 (2023-2024)
- Teachers: 886.06 (FTE)
- Staff: 1,202.76 (FTE)
- Student–teacher ratio: 23.44:1

Other information
- Website: www.leusd.k12.ca.us

Lake Elsinore Unified School District is a public school district located in Lake Elsinore, California, USA. It was formed on July 1, 1989, when the Elsinore Union High School District merged with the Lake Elsinore School District (elementary). The Lake Elsinore Unified School District is the 8th largest school district (by student population) in Riverside County and encompasses an area of 131.78 square miles.

== Boundary ==
The district serves the majority of Lake Elsinore and Wildomar, portions of Meadowbrook and Temescal Valley, and the entirety of Canyon Lake, Lakeland Village and Warm Springs.

== District profile ==
With roots going back to two schools built in 1884, Lake Elsinore's school system is one of Riverside County’s oldest. The district now includes thirteen elementary schools, two K-8 schools, five middle schools, three comprehensive high schools and five alternative education schools.

Lake Elsinore Unified has recently seen a sharp increase in enrollment due to the fast growth of residential development. To match that growth, the district opened four new schools between 2005 and 2007: Lakeside High School (2005), Lakeland Village Middle School (2005), Ronald Reagan Elementary School (2006) and Earl Warren Elementary School (2007).

Jean Hayman Elementary was closed at the end of the 2008 school year due to budget cuts. Built in 1984, Hayman was the district's fifth-oldest elementary school. Seismic findings will keep the school from reopening. In February 2010, the school board voted to close Butterfield Elementary School, the district's fourth-oldest and fifth-largest of 15 elementary schools, at the end of the 2009-10 school year in order to save approximately $500,000. $1,500,000 will be spent to remodel the local middle school, Lakeland Village Middle School, to accommodate the students from Butterfield, converting the school into a K-8 facility. Another elementary campus, Luiseño Elementary, was also converted into a K-8 school (adding a year at a time) at the cost of $12.5 million. This eventually grew to a total cost of $13,657,928.

While dealing with the rapid growth, it is also making strong gains when it comes to academic achievement. In August 2008, scores released by the California Department of Education showed that Lake Elsinore Unified was the highest-improving school district out of 23 districts in Riverside County. The district’s third-place showing (county-wide) in 2008 was a marked improvement from 11th place four years before. LEUSD had the fifth-highest gain of all K-12 Districts in the State of California in 2008.

Three of Lake Elsinore's middle schools were among the top 15 middle schools in the California for API growth. They are: Lakeland Village Middle School (#1 middle school growth in California), Terra Cotta Middle School (#7 middle school growth in California), and Elsinore Middle School (#13 middle school growth in California). Four of Lake Elsinore's schools were among the top 50 schools in Riverside County for overall API score in 2008. They are: Tuscany Hills Elementary (#10), Withrow Elementary and Rice Canyon Elementary (tied at #32), and Luiseno Elementary (#38). Eight of the top 20 schools with the greatest API growth in Riverside County are from LEUSD. They are: Lakeland Village Middle (#2), Ortega High (#5), Machado Elementary (#6), Elsinore Elementary (#7), Butterfield Elementary (#11), Terra Cotta Middle (#13), Elsinore Middle (#18), and Jean Hayman Elementary (#19). Two of Lake Elsinore's schools were in the top 10 for API growth for comprehensive high schools in Riverside County. They are: Temescal Canyon High (#2), and Elsinore High (#6).

The district is beginning to receive recognition as one of Riverside County’s best and so are some of its schools. In April 2007, only two high schools in Riverside County were given the prestigious California Distinguished School designation by state education officials: Elsinore and Temescal Canyon high schools, both Lake Elsinore Unified schools. They joined Luiseno Elementary School, which received the honor when elementary schools were chosen in 2006, and Tuscany Hills Elementary School which was named a California Distinguished School in 2008, making it the fourth district school to receive this designation. Lakeland Village and Terra Cotta Middle Schools are now officially named California Distinguished Schools for 2009 and will be recognized by the California Department of Education during the month of May. With an API gain of 111 points, Lakeland Village Middle School was the highest-improving middle school in the state. With its 70-point gain, Terra Cotta was the seventh highest-improving middle school in the state.

In late 2009, the district decided to experiment with a K-8 format for two of its schools. Administrators decided to close the distinguished Butterfield Elementary School at the end of the 2009-2010 school year and move its entire student (700 students) and teacher population to Lakeland Village Middle School about three miles south. Half of the existing Lakeland Village Middle School students and teachers would be moved to other schools to make space for the incoming elementary students. $1.5 million would be spent on the four-year-old Lakeland Village Middle School campus to adapt it for use by the kindergarten through fifth graders that would be added. Four hundred middle school students (Grades 6-8) would remain at the campus. This campus was renamed Lakeland Village School. The Butterfield heritage was kept by renaming the theatre/multi-purpose room as the Butterfield Performing Arts Center. A new principal was named to head the combined campus. In its closing year, the Butterfield Elementary API tests scores increased to 853, a growth of 76 points, the second-largest elementary increase in all of Riverside and San Bernardino counties.

At the same time, a different approach was being used at the former Luiseño Elementary School located in the Horsethief Canyon community. At this campus only sixth graders would be added for the first year (current fifth graders), followed by seventh and eighth grades the following two years. This facility was renamed Luiseño School. $12.5 million would be spent to adapt it for use by the sixth through eighth graders that would be added. This "growth" model would keep a continuity of students from the previous elementary grades, and not introduce younger students to an older population of existing middle school students as was implemented at Lakeland Village School.

On February 13, 2014 the district voted to hire architectural and construction firms for 3 new (or rebuilt) campuses. Plans were to partially reopen the closed Butterfield Elementary with a rebuilt campus by Fall 2015 (expanding to 6th grade by 2016). However, after investigation by the planning and architectural firms, it was decided that reconstruction costs of the Butterfield campus would be too high to deal with possible seismic refits and the plan to reopen that school has been cancelled. Plans continue to build new elementary campuses on district-owned land in the Summerly Housing tract near the Lake Elsinore Diamond, and to build a new elementary school on district-owned land near Wasson Canyon Road.

During the 2013-14 school year, planning groups and boundary committees began working on a plan to move most 6th grade students back onto elementary campuses in many areas of the community by the Fall of 2016. This will reverse district actions taken in 1995-96 to move 6th grade students from elementary campuses to create middle school campuses. However, it is expected than several middle schools will retain their 6th grade students in areas that are highly impacted by large enrollments in elementary schools.

== Elementary class sizes ==
On July 1, 1989, the Elsinore Union High School District merged with the Lake Elsinore School District (elementary) to form the Lake Elsinore Unified School District.

In 1995-96, all Grade 6 classes were moved from district elementary schools to create Grades 6 through 8 middle schools. In 1996-97 the district implemented California's Class Size Reduction (CSR) program by placing only 20 students in Grade 1, then added Grade 2 to the program in 1997-98, and Kindergarten and Grade 3 (Primary Grades) in 1998-99. In 2011-12 the district began increasing class sizes in grades K–3 in response to lower state funding. The new upper limit was 24 in most classes.

Starting in the 2012-13 school year, the district starting using a new standard of having an "average" of 24 students in primary classrooms. The goal was to have an average of students "over the year" of no more than 24 students. The district expanded on this in 2013-14 by having no more than an average of 24 students in all elementary classes across the district, but not limited to an individual classroom or even school. As of 2014, however, there were still numerous primary classrooms across the district with classes of up to 29 per class.

For 11 school years, 1991-92 through 2001-02, most schools were on a single-track, year-round schedule with classes held year-round except for August, December and April, though some schools had multiple-track, year-round schedules. In 2002-03, the district moved back to a traditional schedule with all schools starting in August and finishing in June.

== Student ethnicity ==
The Lake Elsinore Unified School District's ethnicity, and comparison to State Averages, is as follows:

Response	District Percentage	State Average
Hispanic:	50%	48%
White:	38%	29%
African American:	5%	8%
Asian:	2%	8%
Filipino:	2%	3%
Multiple/no response:	2%	3%
Pacific Islander:	<1%	<1%
American Indian:	<1%	<1%

== Superintendents over the years ==
The historical record is as follows:

Dates	Superintendents	Length of tenure
1989 to 1992	Dr. Larry Maw	3 years
1992 to 1999	Dr. David Long	7 years
1999 to 2005	Dr. Sharron Lindsay	7 years
1/2006 to 7/2012	Dr. Frank Passarella	6.5 years
7/2012 to present	Dr. Doug Kimberly	in 7th year

== Schools ==
=== Elementary ===
- Alberhill Elementary School
- Cottonwood Canyon Elementary School
- Donald Graham Elementary School
- Earl Warren Elementary School
- Elsinore Elementary School
- Machado Elementary School
- Railroad Canyon Elementary School
- Rice Canyon Elementary School
- Ronald Reagan Elementary School
- Tuscany Hills Elementary School
- Wildomar Elementary School
- William Collier Elementary School
- Withrow Elementary School

=== K-8 Schools ===
The Lake Elsinore Unified School District converted two schools to K-8 (kindergarten through 8th grade schools) starting in the Fall of 2010.

- Luiseño School (was Luiseño Elementary School until it became a K-6 school in the Fall of 2010. It grew over the next two years to become a K-8 school in 2012.)
- Lakeland Village School(was Lakeland Village Middle School until it becomes a K-8 school with the addition of the K-5 students from the closing Butterfield Elementary School beginning in the Fall of 2010.)

=== Middle ===
- Canyon Lake Middle School
- Elsinore Middle School
- Terra Cotta Middle School
- David A. Brown Middle School

=== High ===
- Elsinore High School
- Lakeside High School
- Temescal Canyon High School

=== Alternative ===
- Keith McCarthy Academy
- Ortega Continuation High School
- Valley Adult School

=== Closed schools ===
- Butterfield Elementary School (permanently closed in June 2010, students moved to Lakeland Village School)(K-8)
- Jean Hayman Elementary School (2008, now permanently closed)
- Southern California Online Academy (Former dependent Charter School, later combined with Keith McCarthy Academy)

=== New school plans ===
- Rosetta Canyon Area Elementary School
