= Wildomar, California =

City in California, United States

- City
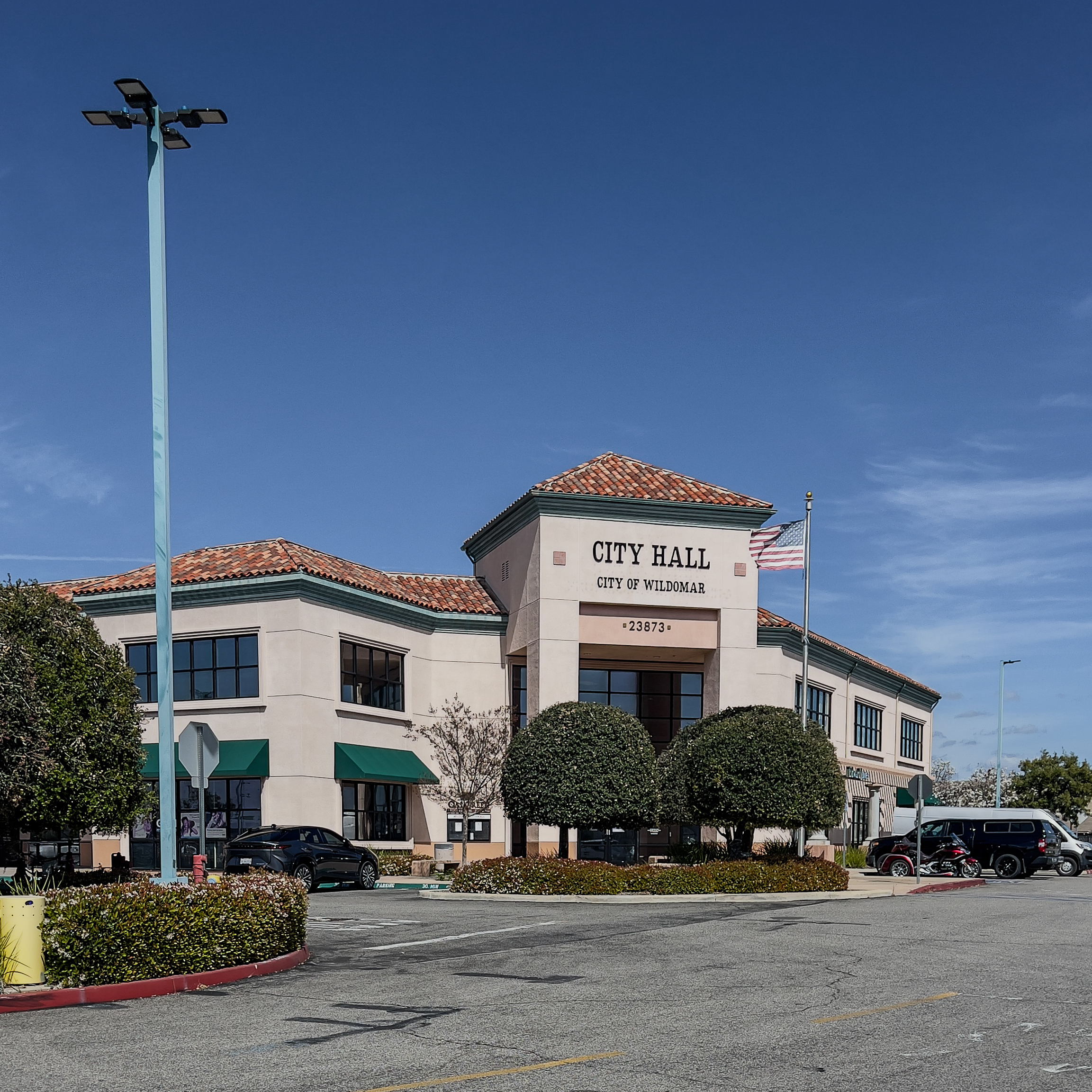
- Wildomar City Hall

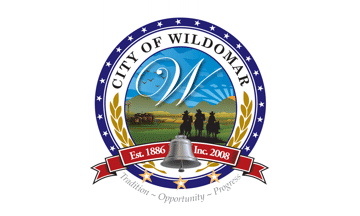
- Flag
- Interactive map of Wildomar, California
- Location in the United States
- Coordinates: 33°35′56″N 117°16′48″W
- Country: United States
- State: California
- County: Riverside
- Incorporated: July 1, 2008
- Named for: William Collier; Donald Graham; Margaret Collier Graham

Government
  - Type: Council-Manager
  - Mayor: Carlos Marquez
  - Mayor Pro Tem: Dustin Nigg
  - City council: Bridgette Moore; Ashlee Dephillippo; Joseph Morabito
  - City Manager: Chris Mann

Area
  - Total: 23.70 sq mi (61.39 km^{2})
  - Land: 23.70 sq mi (61.39 km^{2})
  - Water: 0 sq mi (0.00 km^{2}) 0%
- Elevation: 1,270 ft (387 m)

Population (2020)
  - Total: 36,875
  - Estimate (2024): 37,736
  - Density: 1,556.7/sq mi (601.0/km^{2})
- Time zone: UTC-8 (PST)
  - Summer (DST): UTC-7 (PDT)
- ZIP code: 92595
- Area code: 951
- FIPS code: 06-85446
- GNIS feature IDs: 1661691, 2497148
- Website: www.wildomar.gov

Wildomar is a city in southwestern Riverside County, California, United States. The city was incorporated on July 1, 2008. As of the 2020 census, the population was 36,875. The community has grown quickly during the early 21st century; the population has more than doubled since the 2000 census, when the community was still an unincorporated census-designated place.

== History ==
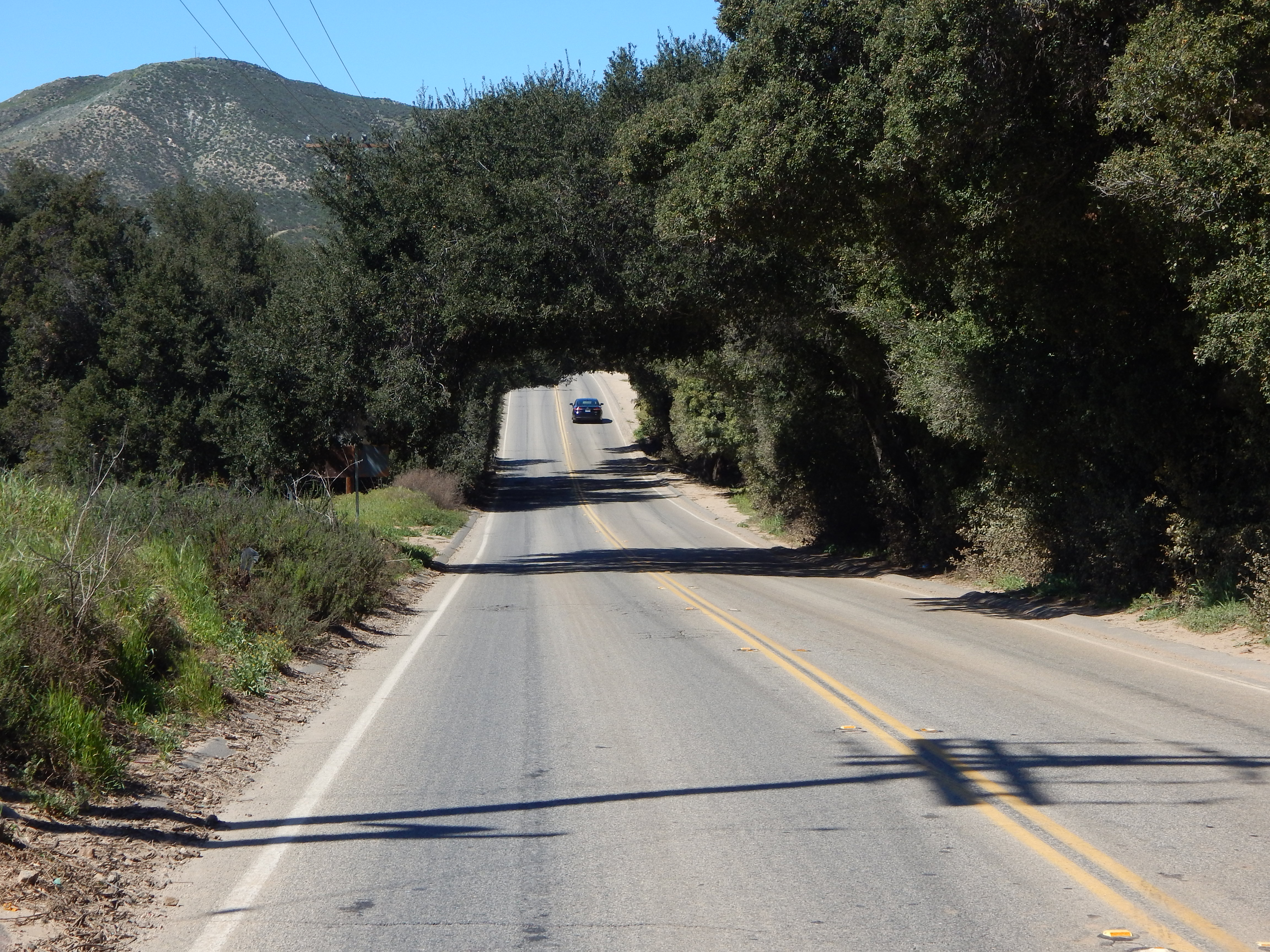
Bundy Canyon Road

In the summer of 1880 when, looking down from the peak of Mt. Baldy, Franklin Heald of Pasadena first noticed Lake Elsinore, then known as La Laguna. A few months later, in October, Frank Kimbal of San Diego signed an agreement with the Atchison, Topeka and Santa Fe Railroad to build a rail line past the lake from San Diego to Barstow, then known as Waterman.

The next winter, Heald traveled by buggy to see La Laguna (Lake Elsinore) at the same time work commenced on the rail line from San Diego skirting the lakeshore. The new line was to be known as the California Southern Railroad. Rails and spikes were brought from Antwerp, Belgium, and locomotives came from the Eastern Seaboard. The line was completed as far as Colton on August 14, 1882. The new train service was destined to bring development to the Wildomar area, then known as the southern portion of the Rancho La Laguna.

Heald found that the Rancho La Laguna could be purchased, with the exception of some 500 acres (2.0 km^{2}) owned by the Machado family, from the London and San Francisco Bank for $24,000. On July 3, 1883, Heald paid $1,000 as a down payment on the area. He then brought in William Collier and Donald Graham as partners. On September 24 of that year, the three men purchased the 12,832 acres (51.93 km^{2}) of Rancho La Laguna with an additional payment of $7,000 advanced by William Collier. The remaining debt was paid off shortly thereafter.

The railroad placed a boxcar, known as "Car B", off to the north-west side of the mainline near what is now Clinton Keith Road on January 1, 1884. For a number of years, this served as the railroad depot for the area that was to become Wildomar.

Heavy rains in the winter of 1884 left as much as 60 inches (1,500 mm) washing out the railroad tracks below Temecula as well as along the San Jacinto River and Railroad Canyon near the shore of Lake Elsinore. Flood damage broke the California Southern Railroad financially. The Santa Fe Railroad came to the rescue. Santa Fe took over the rail line and rebuilt it by the beginning of 1885. The rail line through Wildomar became part of the Atchison, Topeka and Santa Fe Railroad.

In January 1885, Collier, Graham, and Heald made a map of Blocks K, L and M of the Elsinore area, recording the maps with San Diego County in October of that year. In February 1885, Collier and Graham purchased Franklin Heald's one-third interest in the 2,600 acres (11 km^{2}) of unsold land south-east of Corydon Road. Heald took full interest in the unsold land to the north-west of the Corydon Road line.

Collier and Graham made a map of the Wildomar townsite in December 1885, recording it with San Diego County on November 20, 1886. The name Wildomar was derived by combining the names of the new town's founders, Wil for William Collier, do for Donald Graham, and mar for Margaret Collier Graham, wife of Donald Graham and sister of William Collier.

In 1886 a new school was built, along with a post office and railroad depot. By 1887, Wildomar could boast a large hotel, livery stable, blacksmith shop, numerous stores, a lumber yard, and a park. A Methodist-Episcopalian church was built in 1888 across from the new school just north-west of Central Avenue. In October 1887, Collier and Graham made a map of the Santa Rosa addition to Wildomar, an addition of about 1,500 acres (6.1 km^{2}) purchased from Parker Dear, owner of the Rancho Santa Rosa who was attempting to develop a town he called Linda Rosa further south on the rail-line. This new map was recorded February 10, 1892, in the San Diego County records.

By the start of the 20th century, Wildomar even had its own newspaper, The Transcript. The railroad, however, continued to be plagued by washouts and within a few years, the rail connection south from Temecula to San Diego were abandoned. With fewer trains, Wildomar's development slowed. Then, in 1935, rail service to Wildomar was abandoned and the rails were pulled up back to Pinacate. Wildomar was almost a forgotten community. Then, in the early 1980s, the Temecula Valley Freeway (I-15) was completed, bringing with it a new wave of interest in the area. Once again, Wildomar had begun to grow and experience new prosperity.

The citizens of Wildomar and Sedco Hills voted on February 5, 2008, to incorporate. Wildomar became the 25th city in Riverside County on July 1, 2008.

The city was an important place for honey production.

== Geography ==
Wildomar is located at 33°36′27″N 117°15′37″W (33.607460, -117.260193).

According to the United States Census Bureau, the community has a total area of 23.7 square miles (61 km^{2}), all of it land.

== Demographics ==
=== Racial and ethnic composition ===
Wildomar, California – Racial and ethnic composition Note: the US Census treats Hispanic/Latino as an ethnic category. This table excludes Latinos from the racial categories and assigns them to a separate category. Hispanics/Latinos may be of any race.
Race / Ethnicity (NH = Non-Hispanic)	Pop 1990	Pop 2000	Pop 2010	Pop 2020	% 1990	% 2000	% 2010	% 2020
White alone (NH)	8,768	10,111	17,255	16,080	84.22%	71.89%	53.63%	43.61%
Black or African American alone (NH)	90	229	960	1,319	0.86%	1.63%	2.98%	3.58%
Native American or Alaska Native alone (NH)	66	67	198	200	0.63%	0.48%	0.62%	0.54%
Asian alone (NH)	165	249	1,384	1,957	1.58%	1.77%	4.30%	5.31%
Native Hawaiian or Pacific Islander alone (NH)	165	32	53	176	1.58%	0.23%	0.16%	0.48%
Other race alone (NH)	10	33	55	208	0.10%	0.23%	0.17%	0.56%
Mixed race or Multiracial (NH)	x	308	908	1,860	x	2.19%	2.82%	5.04%
Hispanic or Latino (any race)	1,312	3,035	11,363	15,075	12.60%	21.58%	35.32%	40.88%
Total	10,411	14,064	32,176	36,875	100.00%	100.00%	100.00%	100.00%

=== 2010 census ===
Historical population
Census	Pop.	Note	%±
1990	10,411		—
2000	14,064		35.1%
2010	32,176		128.8%
2020	36,875		14.6%
2024 (est.)	37,736	▲	2.3%
U.S. Decennial Census

The 2010 United States census reported that Wildomar had a population of 32,176. The population density was 1,358.3 inhabitants per square mile (524.4/km^{2}). The racial makeup of Wildomar was 22,372 (69.5%) White (53.6% Non-Hispanic White), 1,065 (3.3%) African American, 376 (1.2%) Native American, 1,454 (4.5%) Asian, 69 (0.2%) Pacific Islander, 5,124 (15.9%) from other races, and 1,716 (5.3%) from two or more races. There were 11,363 residents of Hispanic or Latino ancestry, of any race (35.3%).

The Census reported that 32,134 people (99.9% of the population) lived in households, 38 (0.1%) lived in non-institutionalized group quarters, and 4 (0%) were institutionalized.

There were 9,992 households, out of which 4,399 (44.0%) had children under the age of 18 living in them, 5,982 (59.9%) were opposite-sex married couples living together, 1,178 (11.8%) had a female householder with no husband present, 645 (6.5%) had a male householder with no wife present. There were 604 (6.0%) unmarried opposite-sex partnerships, and 59 (0.6%) same-sex married couples or partnerships. 1,600 households (16.0%) were made up of individuals, and 752 (7.5%) had someone living alone who was 65 years of age or older. The average household size was 3.22. There were 7,805 families (78.1% of all households); the average family size was 3.58.

There were 8,966 people (27.9%) under the age of 18, 3,256 people (10.1%) aged 18 to 24, 8,346 people (25.9%) aged 25 to 44, 8,194 people (25.5%) aged 45 to 64, and 3,414 people (10.6%) who were 65 years of age or older. The median age was 34.6 years. For every 100 females, there were 97.6 males. For every 100 females age 18 and over, there were 95.9 males.

There were 10,806 housing units at an average density of 456.2 per square mile (176.1/km^{2}), of which 7,329 (73.3%) were owner-occupied, and 2,663 (26.7%) were occupied by renters. The homeowner vacancy rate was 2.7%; the rental vacancy rate was 5.1%. 23,369 people (72.6% of the population) lived in owner-occupied housing units and 8,765 people (27.2%) lived in rental housing units.

According to the 2010 United States Census, Wildomar had a median household income of $60,219, with 13.0% of the population living below the federal poverty line.

Racial composition as of the 2020 census
Race	Number	Percent
White	19,026	51.6%
Black or African American	1,403	3.8%
American Indian and Alaska Native	605	1.6%
Asian	2,061	5.6%
Native Hawaiian and Other Pacific Islander	203	0.6%
Some other race	7,253	19.7%
Two or more races	6,324	17.1%

=== 2020 census ===
As of the 2020 census, Wildomar had a population of 36,875 and a population density of 1,556.7 inhabitants per square mile (601.0/km^{2}). The median age was 37.1 years. The age distribution was 24.2% under the age of 18, 9.3% aged 18 to 24, 26.1% aged 25 to 44, 26.3% aged 45 to 64, and 14.1% aged 65 or older. For every 100 females, there were 97.8 males, and for every 100 females age 18 and over there were 97.0 males age 18 and over.

The census reported that 99.6% of the population lived in households, 0.4% lived in non-institutionalized group quarters, and 0.0% were institutionalized. 83.9% of residents lived in urban areas, while 16.1% lived in rural areas.

There were 11,267 households, out of which 40.2% included children under the age of 18. Of all households, 56.7% were married-couple households, 7.4% were cohabiting couple households, 15.4% had a male householder with no spouse or partner present, and 20.5% had a female householder with no spouse or partner present. About 15.1% of all households were made up of individuals, and 7.2% had someone living alone who was 65 years of age or older. The average household size was 3.26. There were 8,916 families (79.1% of all households).

There were 11,724 housing units at an average density of 494.9 units per square mile (191.1 units/km^{2}). Of these, 96.1% were occupied; of occupied units, 72.8% were owner-occupied and 27.2% were occupied by renters. 3.9% of housing units were vacant, with a homeowner vacancy rate of 1.0% and a rental vacancy rate of 4.7%.

=== 2023 estimate ===
In 2023, the US Census Bureau estimated that the median household income was $95,677, and the per capita income was $34,555. About 12.0% of families and 12.3% of the population were below the poverty line.

== Economy ==
=== Top employers ===
As of June 2024, the top employers in the city were:

#	Employer	# of Employees
1	Lake Elsinore Unified School District	2,381
2	Inland Valley Medical Center	945
3	Southern California Edison	232
4	Cornerstone Community Church & School	130
5	Stater Bros.	124
6	Kaiser Permanente	120
7	Albertsons	105
8	Animal Friends of the Valley	83
9	Wildomar Senior Assisted Living	67
10	FCP Inc.	62

== Politics ==
Wildomar vote by party in presidential elections
Year	Democratic	Republican	Third Parties
2024	35.89% (5,799)	61.57% (9,948)	2.53% (409)
2020	38.84% (6,502)	59.15% (9,902)	2.01% (337)
2016	35.62% (4,483)	58.16% (7,320)	6.21% (782)
2012	37.28% (4,078)	60.16% (6,580)	2.56% (280)
2008	39.24% (4,094)	58.40% (6,092)	2.36% (246)

In the California State Senate, Wildomar is in the 32nd senatorial district, represented by Republican Kelly Seyarto. In the California State Assembly, the 71st Assembly district, represented by Republican Kate Sanchez.

In the United States House of Representatives, Wildomar is in California's 41st congressional district, represented by Republican Ken Calvert.

== Parks and recreation ==
Iodine Springs Reserve is a protected area managed by the Riverside County Regional Park and Open Space District.

== Services ==
=== Hospitals ===
Inland Valley Medical Center, a Southwest Healthcare System facility, is a general acute care hospital in Wildomar with basic emergency services and a Level II trauma center.

=== Cemetery ===
The Wildomar Cemetery District maintains a cemetery in the town. In 2011, the city of Wildomar proposed to take over management of the cemetery district and accomplished the takeover in November of that year.

=== Library ===
The Wildomar Library is one of 35 branches in the Riverside County Library System. The library opened in 2001 and was originally called the Mission Trail Library. In 2014, the County Board of Supervisors voted to change the name to the Wildomar Library.

=== Transportation ===
Interstate 15 bisects the city of Wildomar. Riverside Transit Agency Routes 8 and 23 provide local bus service to the city.

== Public safety ==
The Riverside County Sheriff's Department's Lake Elsinore Valley Regional Station contracts police services for the city.

The city of Wildomar contracts for fire and paramedic services with the Riverside County Fire Department through a cooperative agreement with CAL FIRE.

== Education ==
The Lake Elsinore Unified School District includes the majority of Wildomar. A portion is in the Menifee Union School District and the Perris Union High School District for grades 9–12.

=== Elementary schools ===
- Donald Graham Elementary School
- Ronald Reagan Elementary School
- Wildomar Elementary School
- William Collier Elementary School
- Sycamore Academy of Science and Cultural Arts

=== Middle schools ===
- David A. Brown Middle School

=== High schools ===
- California Lutheran Academy
- Elsinore High School

=== Higher education ===
There are plans for a new Mt. San Jacinto College (MSJC) campus in Wildomar, located on Clinton Keith Road between Salida del Sol and Elizabeth Lane.

== Flora ==
Wildomar has a variety of native plants. Hills are covered with coastal sage scrub and chaparral plant communities, along with the California Poppy. California sycamore grow along riverbeds, providing shade for ferns and mosses.

== Notable people ==
Tori Kelly - Singer
