= Lakeside High School (Lake Elsinore, California) =

Location
- 32593 Riverside Drive; Lake Elsinore, California; 92530; United States
- Coordinates: 33°40′13″N 117°22′52″W

Information
- Type: Public (U.S.)
- Established: August 22, 2005
- School district: LEUSD
- Principal: Jason Eldridge
- Teaching staff: 71.28 (FTE)
- Grades: 9–12
- Enrollment: 1,657 (2023-2024)
- Student to teacher ratio: 23.25
- Campus: Suburban
- Colors: Hunter green & Vegas gold
- Athletics conference: CIF Southern Section; Raincross Conference
- Mascot: Lancer
- Website: Official Website

Lakeside High School is a public high school located in Lake Elsinore, California and is part of the Lake Elsinore Unified School District. Lakeside High School has been rated as one of the top 10 most beautiful high school campuses in California.

== Sports ==
In 2012, the Lakeside Lancers Boys' Varsity Soccer Team beat Cajon High School with a 3–1 score to win the CIF Championship.

In 2021, the Boys' Swimming team won league championship at Polytechnic High, Riverside.
