= Menifee Union School District =

Public school district in Riverside County, California

Address
- 29775 Haun Road Menifee, California, 92586; United States

District information
- Type: Public
- Grades: K–12
- NCES District ID: 0624540

Students and staff
- Students: 12,195 (2021–2022)
- Teachers: 522.62 (on an FTE basis)
- Staff: 603.68 (on an FTE basis)
- Student–teacher ratio: 23.33:1

Other information
- Website: www.menifeeusd.org

Menifee Union School District is a school district located in the city of Menifee, California, serving grades pre-8. The district plans on adding at least two more schools in addition to the ones listed below.

The district includes most of Menifee and parts of Lake Elsinore, Murrieta, Wildomar, and the census-designated place of French Valley. Students move on to the Perris Union High School District for grades 9-12.

== Pre School ==
- Menifee Preschool

== Elementary ==
- Callie Kirkpatrick Elementary
- Chester W. Morrison Elementary
- Evans Ranch Elementary
- Freedom Crest Elementary
- Harvest Hill STEAM Academy
- Herk Bouris Elementary
- Oak Meadows Elementary
- Quail Valley Elementary
- Ridgemoor Elementary
- Southshore Elementary
- Taawila Elementary

== Middle ==
- Bell Mountain Middle
- Hans Christensen Middle
- Harvest Hill STEAM Academy
- Kathryn Newport Middle
- Menifee Valley Middle
