= List of tributaries of the Santa Ana River =

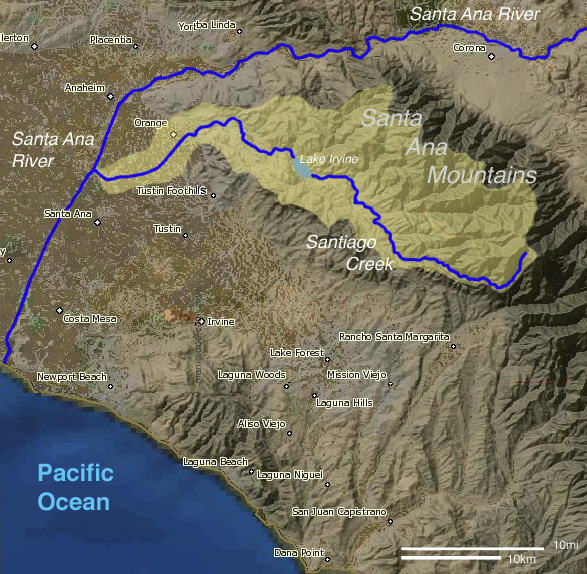
Santiago Creek

The Santa Ana River in the U.S. state of California has over 20 significant tributaries and there are over 50 significant streams in the watershed.

== List ==
- Greenville-Banning Channel
- Huntington Beach Channel
- Santiago Creek
  - Handy Creek
  - Black Star Canyon
  - Limestone Canyon
  - Silverado Creek
    - Ladd Canyon
  - Modjeska Creek
  - Harding Creek
- Blue Mud Creek
- Brush Creek
- Aliso Creek
  - Bane Canyon Creek
  - Water Canyon Creek
- Fresno Canyon
- Wardlow Wash
- Chino Creek
  - Mill Creek
    - Cucamonga Creek
    - Deer Creek
      - Calamity Creek
- Day Canyon Wash
- Etiwanda Creek
  - San Antonio Creek
    - Stoddard Creek
    - Kerkhoff Creek
    - Bear Creek
    - Icehouse Creek
      - Cedar Creek
- Temescal Creek
  - Arlington Valley Channel
  - Oak Avenue Drain
    - Mabey Canyon Creek
    - Oak Street Creek Reservoir
      - Hagador Canyon
        - Tin Mine Canyon
  - Main Street Wash
    - Main Street Canyon
    - Eagle Canyon Creek
  - Joseph Canyon
  - Bedford Canyon Wash
  - Cajalco Canyon Creek
    - Lake Mathews
      - Upper Cajalco Canyon Creek
        - Harford Spring Canyon
        - Mead Creek
  - Olsen Canyon Wash
  - Brown Canyon
    - McBribe Canyon Creek
  - Coldwater Canyon Creek
  - Dawson Canyon Creek
  - Mayhew Canyon Creek
  - Indian Canyon Creek
  - Lee Lake
  - Cow Canyon Creek
- Horsetheif Canyon Creek
  - Ceramic Factory Canyon Creek
  - Rice Canyon Creek
    - Bishop Canyon Creek
  - Alberhill Canyon Creek, in Walker Canyon
  - Gavilan Wash, in Walker Canyon
  - Stovepipe Wash
  - Arroyo Del Toro
  - Wasson Canyon Wash
  - Lake Elsinore
    - McVicker Canyon Creek
    - Leach Canyon Creek
    - Lakeland Village Channel
    - San Jacinto River
      - Cottonwood Canyon Creek in Railroad Canyon
      - Canyon Lake in Railroad Canyon
        - Salt Creek
      - Perris Valley Channel
      - Bautista Creek
      - Indian Creek
      - North Fork San Jacinto River
        - Logan Creek
        - Stone Creek
        - Black Mountain Creek
        - Fuller Mill Creek
      - South Fork San Jacinto River
        - Dry Creek
          - Strawberry Creek
          - Coldwater Creek
        - Spillway Canyon Creek
        - Lake Hemet
        - Herkey Creek
        - Fobes Canyon Creek
        - Pipe Creek
        - Martinez Creek
        - Gold Shot Creek
        - Penrod Canyon Creek
- Hole Lake Creek
  - Hole Lake
- Arroyo Tequesquito
  - Sycamore Canyon
  - Box Springs Canyon
- Sunnyslope Channel
  - Sunnyslope Creek
- Lake Evans Outflow
  - Lake Evans
    - Spring Brook
- Rialto Waste Water Treatment Outflow
- Lytle Creek
  - Warm Creek
    - East Twin Creek
      - Strawberry Creek
    - Sand Creek
  - Cajon Wash
    - Cable Creek
    - Lone Pine Creek
    - Crowder Creek
  - Grapevine Creek
  - Meyer Creek
  - South Fork Lytle Creek
    - Bonita Creek
  - Middle Fork Lytle Creek
  - North Fork Lytle Creek
    - Sheep Creek
    - Coldwater Canyon Creek
- San Timoteo Creek
  - Yucaipa Creek
  - Little San Gorgonio Creek
  - Noble Creek
- City Creek
  - Bledsoe Gulch
  - Schenk Creek
  - East Fork City Creek
  - West Fork City Creek
- Elder Gulch
- Plunge Creek
  - Oak Creek
  - Fredalba Creek
  - Little Mill Creek
- Mill Creek
  - Spoor Creek
  - Mountain Home Creek
    - Skinner Creek
    - East Fork Mountain Home Creek
  - Glen Martin Creek
  - Frustration Creek
  - Monkeyface Creek
  - Oak Cove Creek
  - Bridal Veil Creek
  - Hatchery Creek
  - Momyer Creek
  - Slide Creek
  - Alger Creek
  - Falls Creek
  - Vivian Creek
  - High Creek
- Morton Creek
- Deep Creek
- Government Creek
- Warm Springs Creek
- Alder Creek
- Keller Creek
  - Monroe Creek
- Crystal Creek
- Breakneck Creek
- Bear Creek
  - North Fork Bear Creek
  - Siberia Creek
  - North Creek
  - Grout Creek
  - Minnelusa Creek
  - Rathbun Creek
  - Sawmill Creek
- Deer Creek
- Mile Creek
- Cienaga Creek
- Barton Creek
- Hamilton Creek
- Converse Creek
- Staircase Creek
- South Fork Santa Ana River
- Lost Creek
- Wildhorse Creek
- Cienaga Seca Creek
- Heart Bar Creek
- Coon Creek
