= Gavilan =

Gavilán, meaning sparrowhawk in Spanish, may refer to:

== People ==
- Antonio Lara de Gavilán (1896–1978), Spanish graphic artist, editorial cartoonist and author of comic
- Diego Gavilán (born 1980), Paraguayan football player
- Giuliana Gavilan (born 1996), Argentine handball player
- Jaime Gavilán (born 1985), Spanish football player
- Kid Gavilán (1926–2003), Cuban former welterweight boxer
- Marcelino Gavilán (1909–1999), Spanish horse rider

== Places ==
- Galivan, California, United States
- Gavilan Hills, a range in the Temescal Mountains in Riverside County, California
- Gavilán Peak, now called Fremont Peak, in the Gavilan Hills
- Gavilan Peak (disambiguation), a hill near Anthem, Arizona, north of Phoenix
- Gavilan Plateau, in the Temescal Mountains

== Other uses ==
- Gavilan (TV series), a 1982 TV series
- Gavilan College, a community college located in Gilroy, California
- Gavilán G358, a Colombian light utility transport aircraft of the 1990s
- Gavilan SC, an early laptop computer
- Hydra Technologies Gavilán, an unmanned electrical-surveillance airplane
