= Cajalco Canyon Creek =

Location
- Country: United States
- State: California

Cajalco Canyon Creek is an ephemeral stream that flows through Cajalco Canyon in the Temescal Mountains of Riverside County, California, United States. It is a tributary to Temescal Wash, itself a tributary to the Santa Ana River. Cajalco is thought to be a Hispanic spelling of the word for "quail" in the languages of the Luiseño and Cahuilla who lived in the area.

== Course ==
Cajalco Canyon Creek originally flowed down the northeast face of the Gavilan Hills of the Temescal Mountains at 33°48′25″N 117°18′01″W. It then turned northwest to take in waters from arroyos from Mead Valley and turned west down through the wide, gently sloping Cajalco Valley above Cajalco Canyon gathering waters from the Gavilan Plateau from Harford Spring Canyon at 33°50′04″N 117°21′42″W, and from other minor arroyos. Other small arroyos descended from heights to the north. It entered Temescal Wash at 33°49′24″N 117°30′16″W after descending through the steep narrow gorge of the Cajalco Canyon in the lower reach of the creek. The original course of the creek, before 1933, can be seen on the US Dept. of the Interior's 1898 topographic map of the Elsinore Quadrangle.

== Lake Mathews ==
In the 1930s a dam was built in Cajalco Canyon, blocking the stream as part of the Colorado River Aqueduct project that created the Cajalco Reservoir, now Lake Mathews. Now the water of the upper reach of the creek flows down through Cajalco Valley to join this reservoir at 33°50′11″N 117°22′25″W. The lower reach below the dam still flows through what remains of Cajalco Canyon into the Temescal Wash.
