= Bautista Creek =

Location
- Country: United States
- State: California

Physical characteristics
- Source
  - location: North of the intersection of Bautista Canyon Road and Hog Lake Truck Trail near Anza
  - coordinates: 34°1′9″N 117°14′33″W
- Mouth
  - location: San Jacinto River near Valle Vista
  - coordinates: 33°45′52″N 116°54′40″W

National Wild and Scenic Rivers System
- Type: Recreational
- Designated: March 30, 2009

Bautista Creek is a tributary of the San Jacinto River in Riverside County, California. The creek's headwaters are in the San Bernardino National Forest, north of Anza, California, in the San Jacinto Mountains. Near the creek's headwaters are the sites of several former Cahuilla villages.

As it flows down out of the mountains, the creek passes through Bautista Canyon. Juan Bautista de Anza passed through the canyon in 1774 and 1776 on his way from Nogales, Mexico to San Francisco. The creek also passes the Bautista Conservation Camp, part of the California Conservation Camp Program.

Upon leaving the canyon, the creek is channelized as it runs northwest toward Valle Vista. At State Route 74, it becomes part of the San Jacinto River/Bautista Creek Levee System managed by the U.S. Army Corps of Engineers. The creek finally joins the San Jacinto River just north of Valle Vista and south of the Soboba Reservation.

== Ecological importance ==
Riparian habitat along the creek supports many endangered species, including the arroyo toad, Quino checkerspot butterflies, the San Bernardino kangaroo rat, and the slender-horned spineflower, which range is limited to less than 50-acre (0.20 km^{2}) combined in the Cleveland National Forest and San Bernardino National Forest. An additional fourteen U.S Forest Service sensitive species are present in the area.

== National Wild and Scenic River designation ==
Since 2009, the creek's entire 9.8-mile (15.8 km) length through San Bernardino National Forest has been designated a Wild and Scenic River under the recreation classification.

== See also ==
- List of rivers of California
