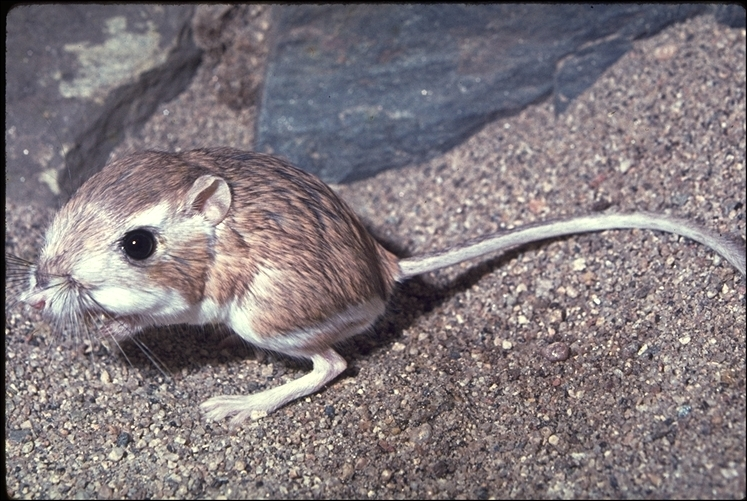

Conservation status
- Endangered (ESA)

Scientific classification
- Kingdom: Animalia
- Phylum: Chordata
- Class: Mammalia
- Order: Rodentia
- Family: Heteromyidae
- Genus: Dipodomys
- Species: D. merriami
- Subspecies: D. m. parvus

Trinomial name
- Dipodomys merriami parvus Elliot, 1901

= San Bernardino kangaroo rat =

Dipodomys merriami parvus San Bernardino kangaroo rat

Subspecies of rodent

The San Bernardino kangaroo rat (Dipodomys merriami parvus) is a species of rodent in the family Heteromyidae. It is one of 19 recognized subspecies of Merriam's kangaroo rat (Dipodomys merriami) that are spread throughout the arid regions of the southwestern United States and Mexico.

Like Dipodomys merriami, the San Bernardino kangaroo rat has the diagnostic trait of having four toes on its hind legs. Additionally, because of its geographic isolation, it has become the most highly differentiated subspecies of D. merriami.

== Description ==
The San Bernardino kangaroo rat follows the same body plan as Dipodomys merriami and other kangaroo rat species: large hind feet for jumping, long tail for balance while jumping, cheek pouches for foraging, and so on. Its body is about 95 millimeters (3.7 inches) long, with a total length of 230–235 mm (9.1–9.3 in). Its body color is weakly yellow with a heavy overwash of dusky brown. The tail stripes are medium to dark brown, with dark brown tail hairs and foot pads. Its flanks and cheeks are dusky.

D. m. parvus is substantially darker and smaller than the other two D. merriami subspecies that live in Southern California (Dipodomys merriami merriami and Dipodomys merriami collinus). This marked adaptation to its habitat has led Lidicker to say that "it seems likely to have achieved nearly species rank." (Lidicker 1960)

== Habitat ==
In most heteromyids, soil texture is a primary factor in determining species distributions. (Brown and Harney, 1993) The range of D. m. parvus is isolated from members of D. m. merriami at the northernmost extent of their range by 8–13 kilometers (5.0–8.1 miles) of unsuitable habitat, indicating possible past intergradation of the two subspecies.

San Bernardino kangaroo rats inhabit places with sandy loam substrates, characteristic of alluvial fans and flood plains, where they are able to dig small, simple burrows. Plant life in such areas is typically dominated by chaparral and coastal sage scrub (soft chaparral). These alluvial scrub habitats can be classified as pioneer, intermediate, and mature, in order of decreased frequency of flooding and increased density of plants. Of these subsections of this particular habitat, D. m. parvus is most populous in intermediate alluvial scrub.

=== Distribution ===
Dipodomys merriami parvus is found unequally distributed between seven isolated locations. The four smallest remnant populations reside near City Creek, Etiwanda, Reche Canyon, and South Bloomington. The largest populations with the most area of suitable habitat are located near the Santa Ana River, Lytle and Cajon Creek, and the San Jacinto River.

The historical range of D. m. parvus encompassed roughly 320,000 acres (130,000 hectares). By the 1930s its range had been reduced to roughly 28,000 acres (11,000 hectares). In 1998, its range was approximated at only 3,247 acres (1,314 hectares).

== Human-caused threats ==
According to the Fish and Wildlife Service, D. m. parvus is threatened by "habitat destruction, degradation, and fragmentation by sand and gravel mining, flood control projects, urban development, vandalism, and inadequate regulatory mechanisms."

While sand and gravel mining and urban development have direct impact upon the habitat, flood control projects such as dams, levees, and berms indirectly change the habitat by preventing flooding. Curtailed flooding in these habitats will cause succession of the preferred intermediate alluvial scrub habitat to mature habitat, as removal and deposition of sand that would normally come with flooding has ceased. Furthermore, in areas with sufficient soil moisture, shrub densities will exceed the sparse to moderate densities where this subspecies lives. (Hanes et al. 1989, McKernan 1997)

Areas that are affected include the Santa Ana River, Lytle and Cajon Creek, and the San Jacinto River.

Urban development, in addition to directly destroying habitat, brings with it domesticated cats, a documented predator of the San Bernardino kangaroo rat. The likelihood of predation increases as the interface between natural and urban habitats is increased.

In addition to predation, the isolated ranges and small populations of D. m. parvus makes increased mortality rates more likely. Reduction in habitat size and species isolation leads to population loss "greater than expected from habitat loss alone," and this trend is well documented for rodents and other vertebrates. (Soule´ et al. 1992, Andren 1994, Bolger et al. 1997)

Isolated populations, being restricted to relatively small local areas, are more subject to extirpation from natural or human caused events, such as floods or drought. Due to their small population, they may also lose genetic variability and experience inbreeding depression. Isolation of groups is increased by the construction of railroad tracks, roads, and flood control channels.

Extirpation from flooding is becoming more likely as urban development pushes the remaining populations to the active flood plain. Due to the engineering of these allotted flood areas, the frequency and severity of flooding makes them uninhabitable. Likewise, in the areas where flooding has been diverted, the canopy density of the brush has increased beyond suitable levels for D. m. parvus.

=== Failed government regulation ===
The Fish and Wildlife Service notes several points of inadequate regulation at the time of publication (1998):

1. Lead agencies made choices detrimental to D. m. parvus under California Environmental Quality Act and National Environmental Policy Act,
2. California Environmental Quality Act rulings are subject to overriding social or economic decisions,
3. California's Natural Community Conservation Planning program, which is responsible for conserving alluvial scrub, is a voluntary program which San Bernardino and Riverside counties had not joined,
4. The Surface Mining Control and Reclamation Act of 1977 requires that the parts of the D. m. parvus range used for mining undergo land rehabilitation; however, this will not likely have a beneficial effect on the species due to the changed topology and hydrology,
5. The Bureau of Land Management set aside three areas along the Santa Ana River for preservation of federally listed species such as D. m. parvus, the Santa Ana River woolly star (Eriastrum densifolium ssp. sanctorum), the slender-horned spineflower, and the California gnatcatcher. However, these areas are also allotted for potential water conservation projects such as percolation basins, and the areas allotted for the federally listed species seldom overlap with the range of D. m. parvus.
6. Finally, the Clean Water Act does not provide for conservation of threatened animals, and while projects executed under that act require a permit from the U.S. Army Corps of Engineers, that agency has "allowed projects to proceed without their overview" within their jurisdiction.
