= Vulcanite =

Copper telluride mineral

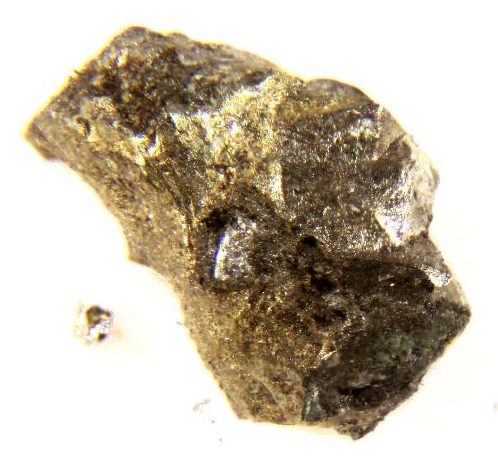
- Vulcanite from Good Hope Mine, Colorado, U.S.

General
- Category: Telluride mineral
- Formula: CuTe
- IMA symbol: Vul
- Strunz classification: 2.CB.75
- Crystal system: Orthorhombic
- Crystal class: Dipyramidal (mmm); H-M symbol: (2/m 2/m 2/m)
- Space group: Pmnm

Identification
- Color: Pale to yellow bronze
- Crystal habit: Massive, granular, tabular
- Twinning: Common
- Cleavage: [hk0] Good, [h0l] Indistinct
- Fracture: Sectile – Curved shavings or scrapings produced by a knife blade
- Mohs scale hardness: 1–2
- Luster: Metallic
- Diaphaneity: Opaque
- Specific gravity: 7.1
- Pleochroism: Very strong, bright yellow to blue-gray
- Fusibility: 1.5

Vulcanite is a rare copper telluride mineral. The mineral has a metallic luster, and has a green or bronze-yellow tint. It has a hardness between 1 and 2 on the Mohs scale (between talc and gypsum). Its crystal structure is orthorhombic.

Vulcanite is named for the place where it was discovered in 1961, the Mammoth Good Hope Mine in Vulcan (ghost town and district), Gunnison County, Colorado. Small deposits have also been discovered in Japan, Russia, Saudi Arabia, and Norway. It occurs with native tellurium, rickardite, petzite, and sylvanite.

== See also ==
- Telluride mineral
