= Miller Narrows =

Coordinates: 34°13′56″N 117°29′11″W

Miller Narrows is a gap that Lytle Creek passes through just below its confluence with South Fork Lytle Creek in San Bernardino County, California.
