= San Jacinto River =

San Jacinto River may refer to:

- San Jacinto River (California)
- San Jacinto River (Texas)
