= Alberhill Canyon =

Valley and arroyo in the Temescal Mountains, Riverside County, California

Alberhill Canyon is an informally named valley and arroyo in the Temescal Mountains of Riverside County, California. It is named for the former mining settlement and populated place of Alberhill that lay opposite the mouth of the arroyo at its confluence with Temescal Creek.

The canyon and the arroyo have their source is at 2,260 feet in the Temescal Mountains at 33°46′00″N 117°22′04″W, 3 miles east of Estelle Mountain. The arroyo is ephemeral, to its mouth in the wetter years, during the wet season in Southern California, otherwise being dry for the balance of the year. From its source Alberhill Canyon trends southwest to enter Walker Canyon 0.7 miles north northeast of Alberhill, California.

From the canyon mouth it is a wash that runs down a short distance to a drain under the I-15 and to its confluence with Temescal Creek northeast of the old schoolhouse of Alberhill, at an elevation of 1214 feet at 33°43′45″N 117°23′39″W. Prior to the construction of the freeway the Alberhill Canyon arroyo ran into Temescal Creek in the vicinity of the drain, the creek was moved during the freeway construction to the south of the freeway.
