= Temescal Creek (Riverside County) =

Coordinates: 33°54′22″N 117°36′50″W

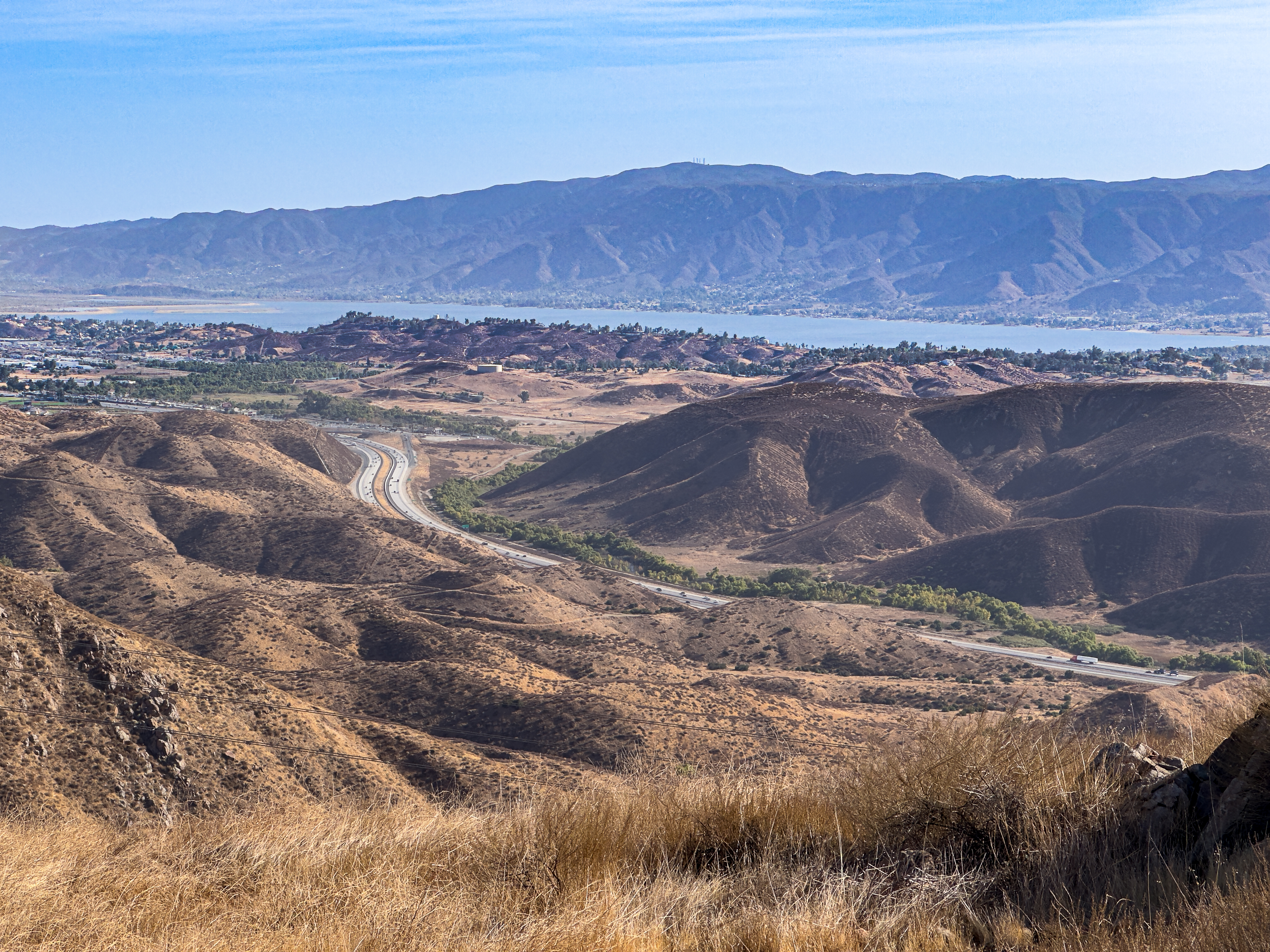
- Temescal Creek flows along Interstate 15 with its source Lake Elsinore in the background

Location
- Country: United States

Physical characteristics
- Source
  - location: Lake Elsinore
- Mouth
  - location: Santa Ana River
- Length: 20 mi (32 km)
- Basin size: 850 mi^{2} (2,200 km^{2})
- Discharge
  - average: 30 cubic feet per second (0.85 m^{3}/s)

Basin features
- Progression: Southeast-northwest
- Tributaries
  - left: Rice Canyon Creek, Horsetheif Canyon Creek, Indian Canyon Creek, Mayhew Canyon Creek, Coldwater Canyon Creek, Brown Canyon Creek, Bedford Canyon Wash, Joseph Canyon Creek, Main Street Canyon Wash, Oak Avenue Drain
  - right: Wasson Canyon Creek, Arroyo Del Toro, Stovepipe Canyon Wash, Gavilan Wash, Alberhill Canyon Creek, Ceramic Canyon Creek, Dawson Canyon Creek, Olsen Canyon Creek, Cajalco Creek, Arlington Valley Channel

Temescal Creek (shown on federal maps as Temescal Wash) is an approximately 29-mile-long (47 km) watercourse in Riverside County, in the U.S. state of California. Flowing primarily in a northwestern direction, it connects Lake Elsinore with the Santa Ana River. It drains the eastern slopes of the Santa Ana Mountains on its left and on its right the western slopes of the Temescal Mountains along its length. With a drainage basin of about 1,000 square miles (2,600 km^{2}), it is the largest tributary of the Santa Ana River, hydrologically connecting the 720-square-mile (1,900 km^{2}) San Jacinto River and Lake Elsinore watersheds to the rest of the Santa Ana watershed. However, flowing through an arid rain shadow zone of the Santa Ana Mountains, and with diversion of ground water for human use, the creek today is ephemeral for most of its length, except for runoff from housing developments and agricultural return flows.

== History ==
Prior to 1886, Temescal Valley and Temescal Creek that flowed through it had much more water than today. In May, 1886 the South Riverside Land and Water Company was incorporated, and it purchased the lands of Rancho La Sierra of Bernardo Yorba, and the Rancho Temescal grant where the colony of South Riverside was laid out. They also secured the water rights to Temescal Creek, its tributaries and Lee Lake. Dams and pipelines were built to carry the water to the colony. In 1889 the Temescal Water Company was incorporated, to supply water for the new colony. This company purchased all the water-bearing lands in the valley and began drilling artesian wells.

The first wells flowed, at a depth of 300 feet. However, pumping plants soon had to be installed as the water table fell. In time all the water of both Temescal and Coldwater Creeks was turned into pipe lines. Cienagas and springs were drained, and, gradually, the central portion of the Temescal Valley became dry and desolate. Farms and orchards in Temescal the central part of the Temescal Valley were abandoned by 1918.

In the 1890s Lake Elsinore water was purchased by the Temescal Water Company for the irrigation of land in Corona, California. Its outlet channel was deepened, permitting gravity flow down the natural channel of Temescal Canyon to Corona for a year or more after the water level sank below the natural elevation of its outlet. As the lake surface continued to recede, a pumping plant was installed, and pumping was continued a few seasons, but the concentration of salts in the lake, due to the evaporation and lack of rainfall, soon made the water unfit for irrigation, and the project was abandoned by the company. Another consequence of this drainage was that the hot springs along the course of the upper creek near Lake Elsinore and in the Warm Springs Valley, ceased to flow and wells had to be dug to obtain those waters.

The water shortage was relieved by the construction of the Colorado River Aqueduct and the building of its terminal reservoir Lake Mathews in 1939. The reservoir is in the upper part of Cajalco Canyon and the lower reach of the Cajalco Valley, on the course of Cajalco Creek, tributary to Temescal Wash.

== Watershed ==
Today Temescal Creek begins as the Elsinore Spillway Channel, an overflow channel that now confines its upper reaches through the middle of downtown Lake Elsinore, then turns and passes northwestward into the Warm Springs Valley, past its confluence with Wasson Canyon Wash, on the right, until it is past the water treatment plant. There it is permitted to spread out into a natural creek, where it has its confluence with Arroyo Del Toro and Stovepipe Canyon Wash on its right, then passes through Walker Canyon gathering in the Gavilan Wash on its right midway on its length, then to where Alberhill Canyon Creek enters on the right Temescal Creek emerges from Walker Canyon. There it has its confluence with the wash of Rice Canyon Creek on its left near Alberhill and Ceramic Factory Canyon Creek on its right across the creek from the ceramic factory. Shortly afterward it crosses underneath the Escondido (I-15) Freeway, is joined by Horsetheif Canyon Creek on its left and flows into Lee Lake, formed by an earthen dam across the creek at the northwest end of the valley before its confluence on its left with Indian Canyon Creek.

The creek is then blocked to the northwest by a ridge of the Santa Ana Mountains running northeast to a steep 1577 foot summit overlooking the deep canyon between it and Estelle Mountain. This ridge divides the Temescal Valley below from the upper valley of Temescal creek. Descending through this unnamed canyon, the creek makes a half circle around the ridge to the north of Lee Lake to enter the Temescal Valley. The creek levels out after leaving the Estelle Mountain canyon, passing through a natural riverbed, the creek receives Mayhew Canyon Wash from the left, Dawson Canyon Wash from the right, Coldwater Canyon Creek and the waters of Brown Canyon Wash and its tributary of McBribe Canyon Creek from the left, Olsen Canyon Wash and Cajalco Creek from the right and Bedford Canyon Wash and Joseph Canyon from the left before entering Temescal Canyon.

As it emerges from Temescal Canyon, north of El Cerrito the creek enters a second reservoir and is forced into a concrete channel. It then flows through the northern part of the city of Corona taking in the Main Street Canyon Wash and Oak Avenue Drain on its left and Arlington Valley Channel on its right before entering into the Prado Flood Control Basin, formed by the Prado Dam across the Santa Ana River. The basin consists of a series of wetlands where Temescal Creek merges with the Santa Ana. In floods, however, the area is a lake, and Temescal Creek's confluence with the larger river is submerged.

== Tributaries of Temescal Creek ==
- Arlington Valley Channel
- Oak Avenue Drain
  - Mabey Canyon Creek
  - Oak Street Creek Reservoir
    - Hagador Canyon
      - Tin Mine Canyon
- Main Street Wash
  - Main Street Canyon
  - Eagle Canyon Creek
- Joseph Canyon
- Bedford Canyon Wash
- Cajalco Canyon Creek
  - Lake Mathews
    - Harford Spring Canyon
    - Mead Creek
- Olsen Canyon Wash
- Brown Canyon
  - McBribe Canyon Creek
- Coldwater Canyon Creek
- Dawson Canyon Creek
- Mayhew Canyon Creek
- Indian Canyon Creek
- Lee Lake
- Cow Canyon Creek
- Horsetheif Canyon Creek
- Ceramic Factory Canyon Creek
- Rice Canyon Creek
  - Bishop Canyon Creek
- Alberhill Canyon Creek, in Walker Canyon
- Gavilan Wash, in Walker Canyon
- Stovepipe Wash
- Arroyo Del Toro
- Wasson Canyon Wash
- Lake Elsinore

== See also ==
- List of rivers of California
- List of tributaries of the Santa Ana River
