= Warm Springs Valley =

Valley in Riverside County, California, USA

Warm Springs Valley is a valley located within the city of Lake Elsinore in Riverside County, California. It lies between the main body of the Temescal Mountains to the north, east and south and the Clevelin Hills to the west. The valley was named for the warm springs that used to be found flowing there.

Warm Springs Valley is located along the upper reach of Temescal Creek near Lake Elsinore its upper point is where the Elsinore Spillway Channel emerges from the gap between the Clevelin Hills and Temescal Mountains 33°42′27″N 117°21′43″W, and runs northward to the head of Walker Canyon 33°40′47″N 117°19′43″W. Its easternmost point is the gap in the mountains where State Highway 74 passes to the east toward Perris 33°42′41″N 117°19′04″W.

Three tributaries of Temescal Creek flow southwestward through the valley and under Interstate 15 into the creek. These are Wasson Canyon Creek to the south near the top of the valley, Arroyo Del Toro in mid valley, and Stovepipe Wash in the north in the lower valley above the Lake Elsinore Outlets.
