= Gavilan Mining District =

Riverside County, California gold seam

Coordinates: 33°48′03″N 117°20′08″W

Gavilan Mining District is a gold mining district 6 miles west of Perris, California and Gavilan Hills and east of Gavilan Peak on the Gavilan Plateau in Riverside County, California. It includes only 2 mines: the Ida Leona Mine and the Gavilan Mine located within yards of each other.

== History ==
It is unknown how much gold these mines produced but they were worked from at least 1855 and perhaps earlier by Californio and New Mexican miners from Agua Mansa. The mines were on the property of the Rancho El Sobrante de San Jacinto which by 1893 had come into the hands of an English syndicate, the San Jacinto Estate Limited of London.

The California Journal of Mines and Geology, Volume 11, 1893 reports these Gavilan Mines:

"... years ago produced from quartz veins considerable gold, the rock being first crushed in numerous arrastras, the beds of which, to the number of fifty or more, are still scattered all about the neighborhood of the mines."
"The veins of the Gavilan Mines are not large, but of good grade, occurring in a granitoid rock. ... The Mexicans worked a large shoot down to the water-line, and judging from the size and number of the dumps these old workings must have been of great extent."
"In later years, under American management, the quartz was hauled to a stamp mill in the Pinacate District."
"At the time the rancho became the property of the English people nothing had been done in these mines for many years."

M. C. Westbrook and Associates, leased most of the mining area from the English syndicate in 1891, planning a town site at the mines called Westbrook.

"During the past two years the old workings have been investigated and a local company organized at Riverside to operate them under lease."

However, when the report writer visited the mines in 1893:

"At the time of my visit some workmen were industriously engaged in taking down the gallows frame of the hoist and making preparations to vacate the premises, and this in the face of the report that had gone abroad that a good-sized vein of pay rock had been uncovered at the bottom of the mine at the depth of 180 feet. I did not see the alleged ore shoot and could get no satisfaction from the men at work other than vague hints that there was dissension among the Board of Directors."

Shortly afterward Westbrook and Associates sold the lease to the mines to the Gavilan Mining and Milling Company for a period of ten years.

The old Gavilan mine ceased to be mined in the 1890s. The Ida Leona mine continued to be worked and was most active in the 1930s and finally closed in 1942, having produced $50,000.
