= Rice Canyon Creek =

Rice Canyon Creek is a tributary creek or arroyo of Temescal Creek in Riverside County, California. Rice Canyon Creek has its source at the head of Rice Canyon at an elevation of 3440 feet in the Santa Ana Mountains at 33°41′54″N 117°24′11″W east of the 4313 foot peak on the north south divide of the range. It is a wash that runs down from the canyon mouth 33°41′07″N 117°27′08″W at 1631 feet to its mouth at its confluence with Temescal Creek near Alberhill, California at an elevation of 1220 feet. Rice Canyon Creek has a tributary, Bishop Canyon Creek which enters the wash on the left a little below the mouth of Rice Canyon at 33°42′05″N 117°24′07″W.

Rice Canyon Creek flows in the rainy season in its upper reach but is an ephemeral arroyo in its lower reach below the narrows 0.80 miles above the canyon mouth, and flows on the surface below the narrows only after more heavy rain events, and is dry the rest of the year. Rice Canyon's creek flows during the rainy season below its narrows to its mouth but its surface flow dries up below the narrows about 0.8 miles above its mouth in the canyon during the dry season, and above that in years with severe drought conditions. However some waterholes remain even in the dry years in the upper reach. Much of the wash in modern times has been interrupted by clay mining operations that stops the surface flows of water from Rice Canyon Creek from reaching Temescal Creek.

== Flora ==
Rice Canyon is characterized by oak woodland along the course of the stream and on the lower south slopes of the canyon, and by chaparral on the north slopes of the canyon to the narrows. Sycamore and cottonwood appear along the creek in places where water remains through the year, mostly underground in the dry season. Just above the narrows and just below it are found cottonwoods and in the wash below the narrows both oak and sycamore amidst coastal sage scrub. The canyon slopes are characterized by chaparral on the south and chaparral and coastal sage scrub on the north to its mouth.

Rice Canyon Creek is home to many Humboldt Lily plants that bloom near the creek in late June to early July at and above the narrows 3/4 of a mile above the mouth of the canyon. Papilio rutulus, Western Tiger Swallowtail, also found in the canyon are to be seen pollinating them.

== Fauna ==
Wildlife species found in the canyon, include: Mountain lion, mule deer, bobcat, coyote, raccoon, gray fox, spotted skunk, wood rat, raven, red tailed hawk, canyon wren, speckled rattlesnake, Pacific rattlesnake, rosy boa.
