= Gavilan Hills =

Mountain range in California, United States

Gavilan Hills, sometimes called the Gavilan Mountains, are a range of the Temescal Mountains, in Riverside County, California. The name given them came from local New Mexican and Californio miners of the mountains and Gavilan Plateau. In Spanish Gavilan, means "sparrow hawk".

== Location ==
This range of the Temescal Mountains runs southward from where they overlook the Cajalco Valley, east of the Gavilan Plateau, Steele Valley and Wasson Canyon Creek to where it tapers down to a low ridge west and south of the location of the Good Hope Mine at 33°43′39″N 117°17′43″W. The high point of the range is the 2,557 foot, unnamed Summit 2557, which overlooks the former site of the mining camp of Gavilan and the Gavilan and Idaleona Mines to the west. Farther south is its second tallest summit, 2520 foot Steele Peak.

== History ==
The Gavilan Hills and Gavilan Plateau were a site of gold mining soon after the beginning of California Gold Rush:

"Many small mining claims and camps were established starting as early as the mid-1850s, mostly by Spanish-speaking individuals. Some familiar names such as Trujillo and Robidoux from the New Mexican colony of Agua Mansa, figured heavily in mining interests there. In fact, one of the main camps was called Rancho de los Trujillos, and it was mentioned frequently in the various claims filed during these years."

In later years at the Gavilan Plateau, there was a small mining settlement of primarily Spanish speaking miners called Gavilan. Some English-speaking miners of the 1880s called it Cedar Flat. Subsequently, in 1891 M. C. Westbrook and Associates, leased most of the mining area planning a town site at the mines called Westbrook. Shortly afterward it was sold to the Gavilan Mining and Milling Company for a period of ten years. The old town and its mines became known as the Gavilan Mine that can be seen on the 1898 Elsinore, California Quadrangle, U. S. Dept. of the Interior, Geological Survey Topographic Map.

Prior to the formation of Riverside County in 1893, the mines of the Gavilan Plateau and northwestern Gavilan Hills, were organized as the Gavilan Mining District within the old boundaries of San Bernardino County and the Pinacate Mining District in the central and southern Gavilan Hills within the old boundaries of San Diego County.

== Quino butterfly habitat ==
The Gavilan Hills are one of the few remaining habitats in Southern California where the endangered Quino checkerspot butterfly can breed and mature.
