= Pinacate, California =

Human settlement in California, US

Coordinates: 33°45′36″N 117°14′0″W

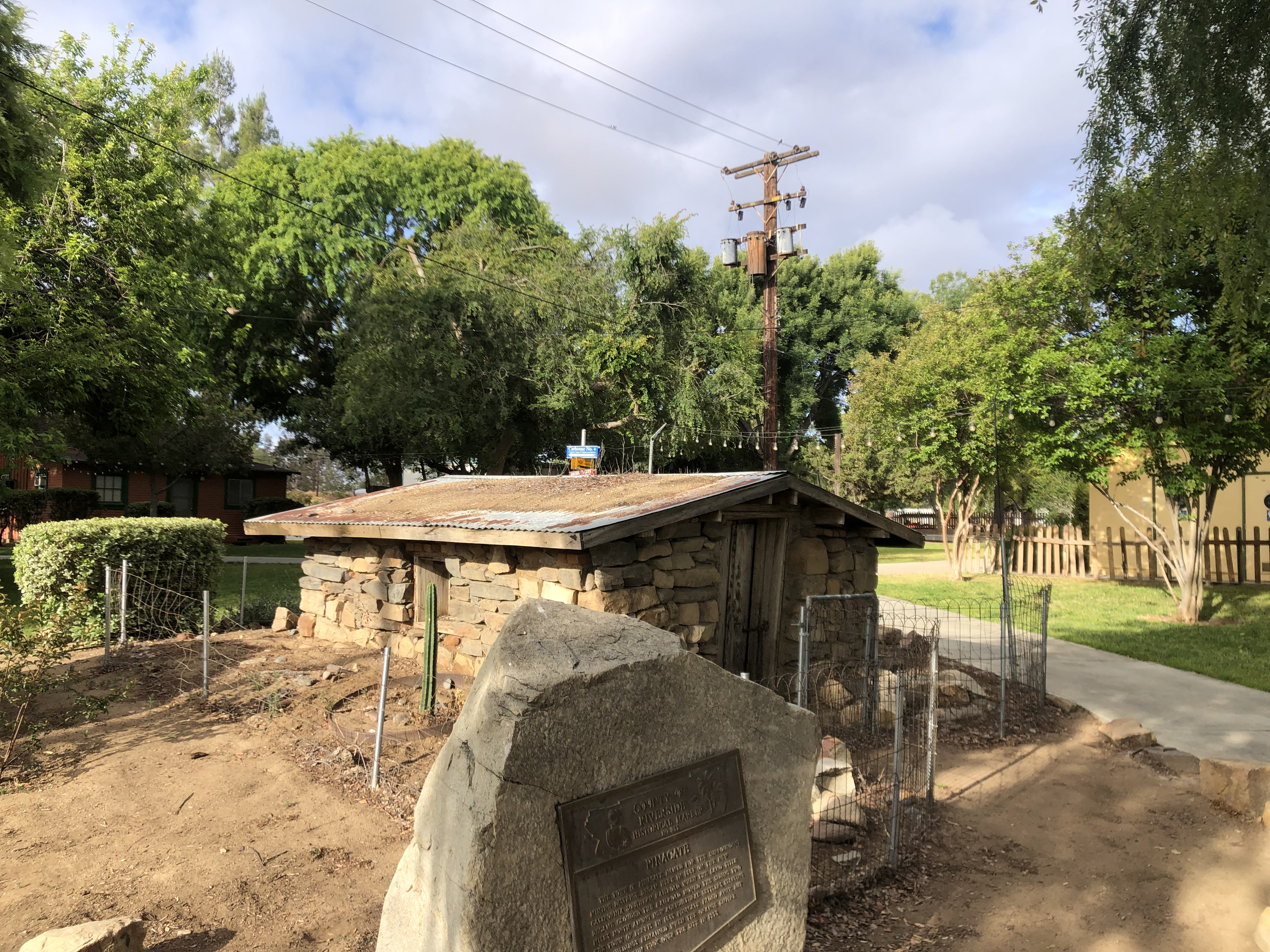
Only remaining building of Pinacate, California. Now on the grounds of the Southern California Railway Museum.

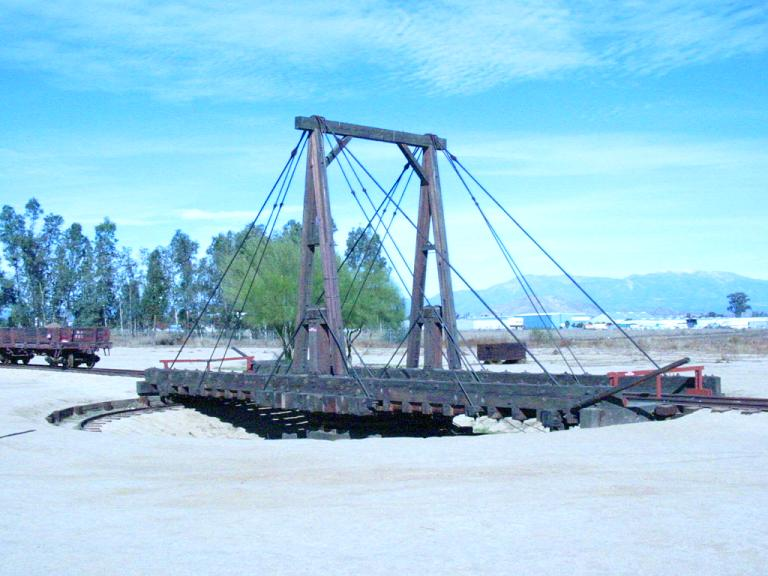
Turntable, currently in the museum.

Pinacate (Mexican Spanish word for the Pinacate beetle), was a small settlement east of the Pinacate Mining District in Riverside County, California. It was established when the California Southern Railroad line was built between Colton and San Diego in 1882. Due to a land title dispute the town was moved to the north to become Perris, California, in 1885.

The Pinacate station remained and become the location of the Southern California Railway Museum, formerly named the Orange Empire Railway Museum.

The Pinacate Middle School is in the area.
