= Lytle Creek Wash =

Coordinates: 34°06′28″N 117°20′00″W

Lytle Creek Wash is the middle reach of Lytle Creek in San Bernardino County, California.
