= Terra Cotta, California =

Terra Cotta
- Unincorporated area
- Location within the state of California Terra Cotta (the United States)
- Coordinates: 33°42′11″N 117°22′29″W
- Country: United States
- State: California
- County: Riverside
- Time zone: UTC-8 (Pacific (PST))
  - Summer (DST): UTC-7 (PDT)

Terra Cotta is a former mining town in Riverside County. It was established in 1887, in the Warm Springs Valley northwest of the town of Lake Elsinore, and later incorporated into the City of Lake Elsinore.

Coal, along with clay deposits, was found on the site by John D. Huff in the late 1880s, and the Southern California Coal and Clay Company was formed to mine them. The town site of Terra Cotta was laid out and was given a post office on October 26, 1887. However, in May 1893, its post office was closed and moved to Lake Elsinore. A plant for the manufacture of sewer and water pipes was built using the coal to fire ceramic pipes in the four kilns. The finished product had to be shipped by wagon six miles through Lake Elsinore to the La Laguna rail station at the mouth of Railroad Canyon until 1896, when a spur line was built through Lake Elsinore and Terra Cotta to the new clay deposits in Alberhill. The coal mined was also used locally as fuel for the stamping mill at the Good Hope Mine and was shipped elsewhere in the state.

Almost abandoned in 1901, Terra Cotta was revived in 1906 when the California Fireproof Construction Company built a new plant there to make ceramic pipes. In 1912, the plant was closed; by 1925, it was closed down, along with most of the buildings in the town. The clay mine in the town site continued to be operated by the Pacific Clay Products Company until 1940, when they transferred all their operations to Alberhill.

An old grid of dirt streets laid out through the sagebrush is all that remains of Terra Cotta. It can be accessed from Lakeshore Drive by Terra Cotta Road or from the I-15 freeway by Nichols Road.

== See also ==
- List of ghost towns in California
