= Grapevine Canyon Creek (San Bernardino County, California) =

Coordinates: 34°11′56″N 117°26′51″W

Grapevine Canyon Creek is a tributary of Lytle Creek in San Bernardino County, California.
