= Meyer Canyon Creek =

Coordinates: 34°12′13″N 117°26′41″W

Meyer Canyon Creek is a tributary of Lytle Creek in San Bernardino County, California.
