= Lake Mathews =

Reservoir in Riverside County, California

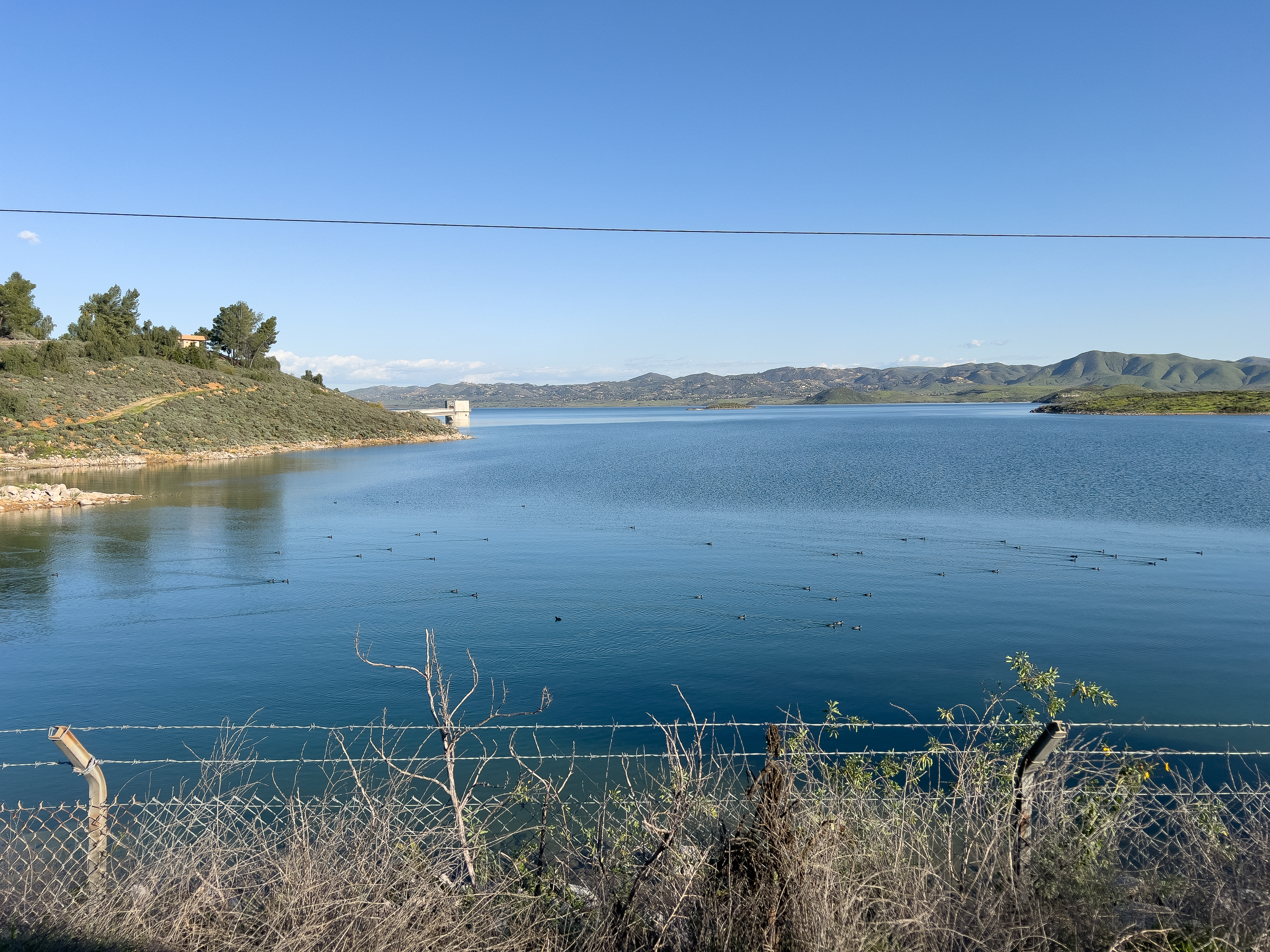
- A view of Lake Mathews from behind the fenced boundary

- Location within California Location within the United States
- Location: Riverside County, California
- Coordinates: 33°50′25″N 117°26′07″W
- Type: reservoir
- Primary inflows: Colorado River Aqueduct
- Primary outflows: Pipelines to member water agencies in the greater Los Angeles area
- Basin countries: United States
- Managing agency: Metropolitan Water District of Southern California
- Max. length: 4 mi (6.4 km)
- Max. width: 2 mi (3.2 km)
- Average depth: Approx. 150 ft (46 m)
- Water volume: 182,000 acre-feet (224 hm^{3})
- Shore length^{1}: Approx. 14 mi (23 km)
- Surface elevation: 1,391 ft (424 m)
- Islands: several small islands; number present depends on reservoir level
- ^{1} Shore length is not a well-defined measure.

Lake Mathews is a large reservoir in Riverside County, California, located in the Cajalco Canyon in the foothills of the Temescal Mountains. It is the western terminus for the Colorado River Aqueduct that provides much of the water used by the cities and water districts of the Metropolitan Water District of Southern California (MWD). The reservoir is fenced and closed to all public access. The lake is near the Riverside community of Lake Hills, and is skirted by Cajalco Road on the south, El Sobrante Road on the north and east, and La Sierra Avenue on the west. La Sierra Avenue traverses the top of the west dike.

The reservoir was constructed by building a large earthfill dam across the northern side of the basin. Two smaller dams, called dikes, were built during the 1961 (65 years ago) expansion to increase the lake's capacity.

== History ==
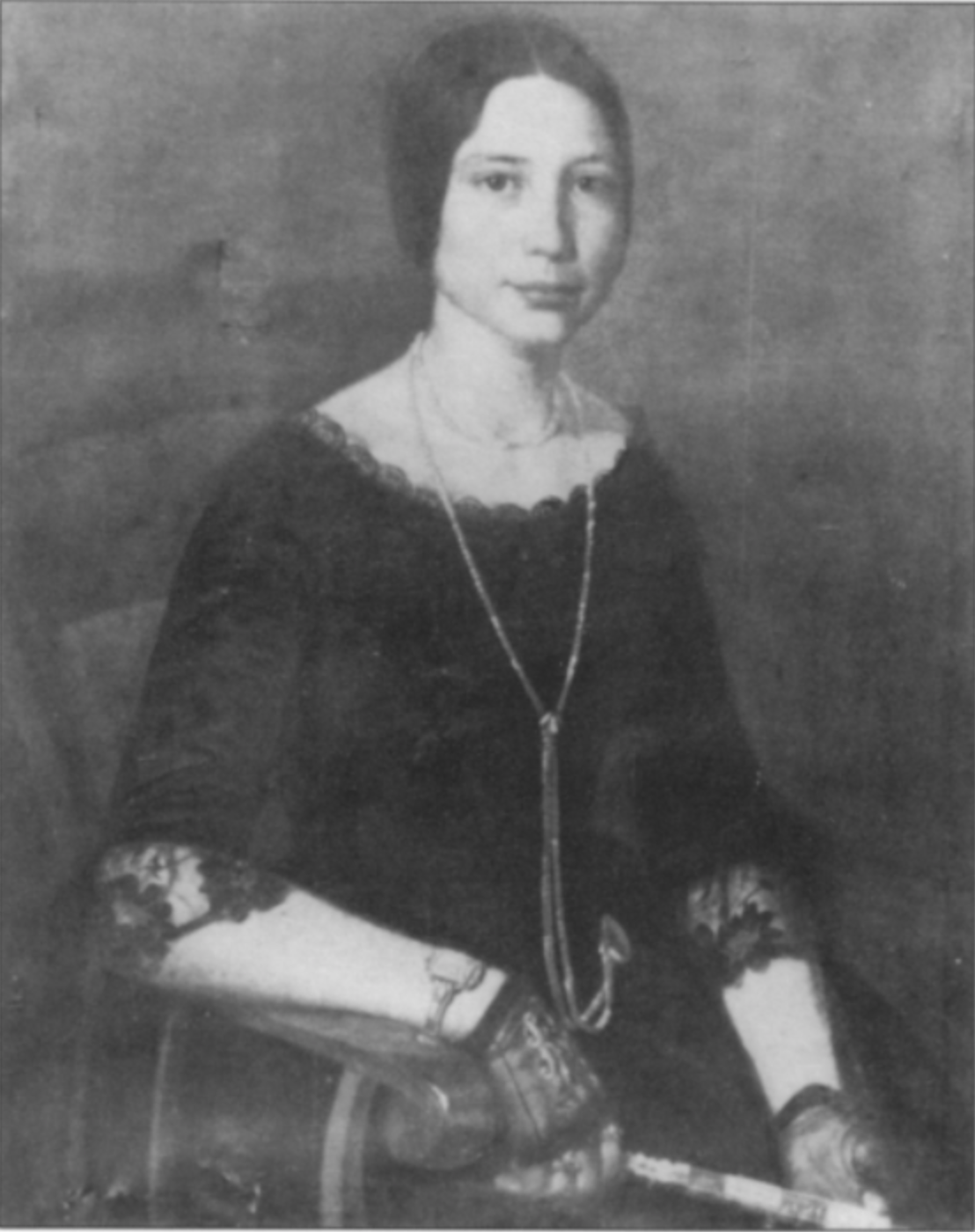
Lake Mathews is located on land originally part of Rancho San Jacinto Sobrante granted in 1846 to María del Rosario Estudillo de Aguirre, a member of the Estudillo family of California and wife of José Antonio Aguirre.

Originally named the Cajalco Reservoir, the reservoir is now named after W.B. Mathews, an attorney who was a key architect of the MWD and its business relationships with member water agencies. Construction on the reservoir began in 1933, while the aqueduct was being built across the desert. The reservoir site had previously been occupied chiefly by carob orchards and tin mines. Lawrence Holmes, Sr., who owned 1,100 acres in the future reservoir basin, lost his property to eminent domain in a lengthy court battle. The dam across Cajalco Canyon and its intake structure were completed in 1939 (87 years ago). The first water arrived from the Colorado River in February 1940, and water deliveries began in 1941. In 1961, the reservoir's capacity was nearly doubled to its current capacity of 182,000 acre-feet.

In the mid-2000s, a large project was undertaken to rehabilitate the old outlet tower and construct a new tower as an alternative. The MWD was concerned about the tower's susceptibility to earthquakes, and age had rendered many of the tower's massive valves unusable. To allow for construction without impacting the water supply, a cofferdam was constructed. Massive concrete tunnels were built to connect the new tower to the existing waterworks.

== Lake Mathews Ecological Reserve ==
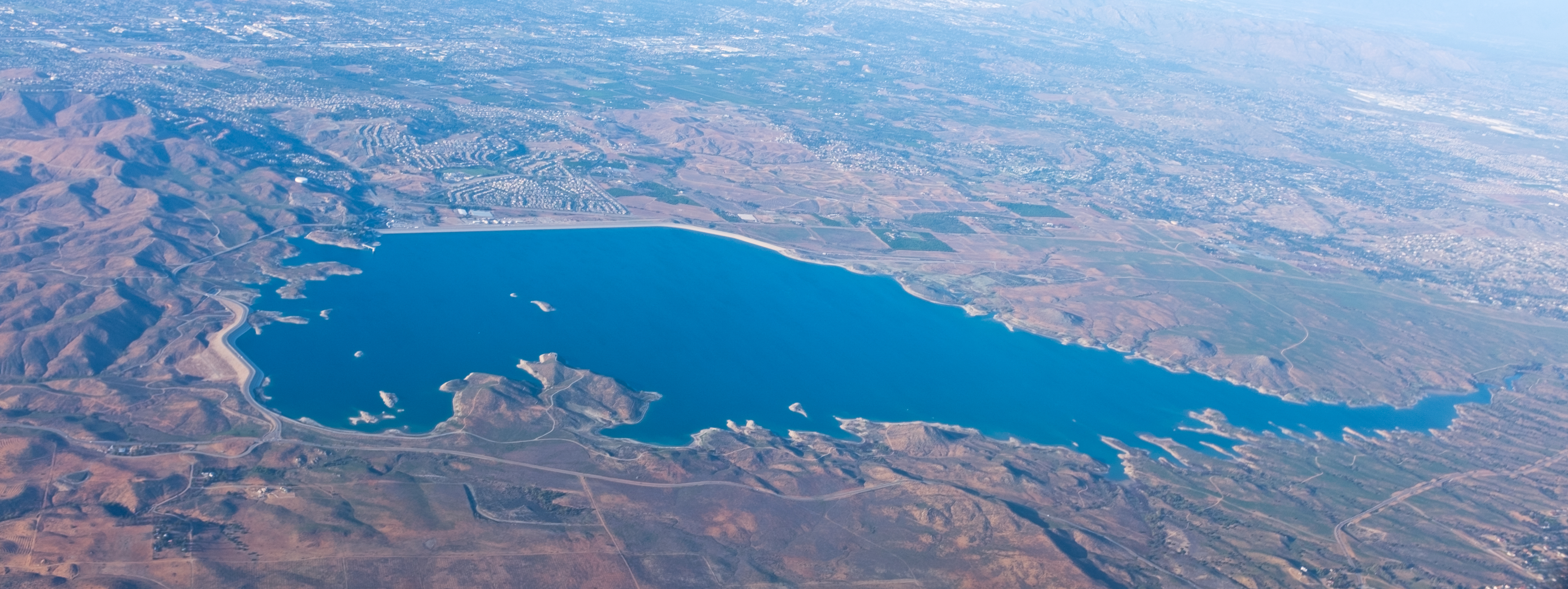
Lake Mathews from the air

Lake Mathews is surrounded by approximately 4,000 acres of protected land. In 1982, this land was declared a state ecological reserve. In the early 1990s, an additional 9,000 acres was added to the reserve after the discovery of the endangered Stephens's kangaroo rat (Dipodomys stephensi) in the area. The area is now called the Lake Mathews Estelle Mountain Reserve.

The Lake Mathews area is an important bird resting and feeding site, particularly in the winter months. In addition to a variety of ducks, double-crested cormorants (Phalacrocorax auritus), western grebe (Aechmophorus occidentalis), eared grebe (Podiceps caspicus), golden eagles (Aquila chrysaetos), and bald eagles (Haliaeatus leucocephalus), are present during the winter.

== Effects on Santa Ana River flow ==
Lake Mathews was constructed in a basin formerly traversed by Cajalco Creek; thus, any water flowing down the creek enters the reservoir. Cajalco Creek is a tributary of the Santa Ana River via Cajalco Canyon Creek into Temescal Creek. The original course of the creek, before 1933, can be seen on the US Dept. of the Interior's 1898 topographic map of the Elsinore Quadrangle.

In 2003, the California State Water Resources Control Board found the MWD's interruption of Cajalco Creek water to be in violation of state water code. An out-of-court settlement was reached where MWD would monitor the quantity of water entering Lake Mathews from the creek and release 1.3 times that amount, minus dam seepage, into the Santa Ana River. In addition, MWD was ordered to contribute $50,000 to aid in the removal of non-native arundo grass (Arundo donax) from the Santa Ana River course.

== Controversy over recreational use ==
Since its dedication in 1940, the reservoir has been fenced off and closed to public access, supposedly to preserve water quality. The MWD has always been concerned about water quality and prohibits body contact sports like swimming in its other nearby reservoirs that are open for recreation, Lake Skinner and Diamond Valley Lake. Mathews is of greatest importance as its outlet feeds directly into pipelines that connect to member water agencies serving 8.4 million people.

During its existence, a number of attempts have been made to gain access to the lake for various purposes, but none have been granted. One of the most notable was a 1952 request for a movie shoot at the lake. The movie was the 1953 movie Fair Wind to Java, and the scene would have featured, among other things, a smoking volcano constructed on one of the lake's islands. After their idea was rejected by the MWD board, the movie's producers reportedly constructed a lagoon and volcano on a studio backlot.

In 1960, the Riverside County Board of Supervisors mounted an unsuccessful campaign to open the lake for recreational purposes. The board generated a resolution citing a "pressing and definite need" for recreational facilities in Southern California.

California Assemblyman Kevin Jeffries, on February 14, 2012, introduced legislation, AB 1686, which would have opened the lake for limited recreation similar to that available at other MWD reservoirs or, at the very least, have allowed for low-impact hiking in the Ecological Reserve. However, Jeffries withdrew the bill on March 20, 2012 after research determined that "virtually bulletproof" agreements prohibiting public access exist between the MWD and other entities interested in maintaining the status quo, and going forward with the bill would have likely resulted in prolonged and expensive legal battles.

== See also ==
- List of dams and reservoirs in California
- List of lakes in California
