= Estelle Mountain =

Mountain in California, United States

- Location within California

Highest point
- Elevation: 2,767 ft (843 m) NAVD 88
- Prominence: 1,217 ft (371 m)
- Coordinates: 33°46′03″N 117°25′19″W

Geography
- Location: Riverside County, California, U.S.
- Parent range: Temescal Mountains
- Topo map: USGS Lake Mathews

Geology
- Rock age(s): Jurassic, Cretaceous
- Mountain type: Granitic

Estelle Mountain is a 2,767-foot (843 m) peak, the tallest in the Temescal Mountains. It is located on the west side of the upper part of the range overlooking the Temescal Valley, in Riverside County, California, United States.

Estelle Mountain is drained on its north slopes by Dawson Canyon Wash and by ten other unnamed canyons all tributary to Temescal Creek on its west, south and east facing slopes.

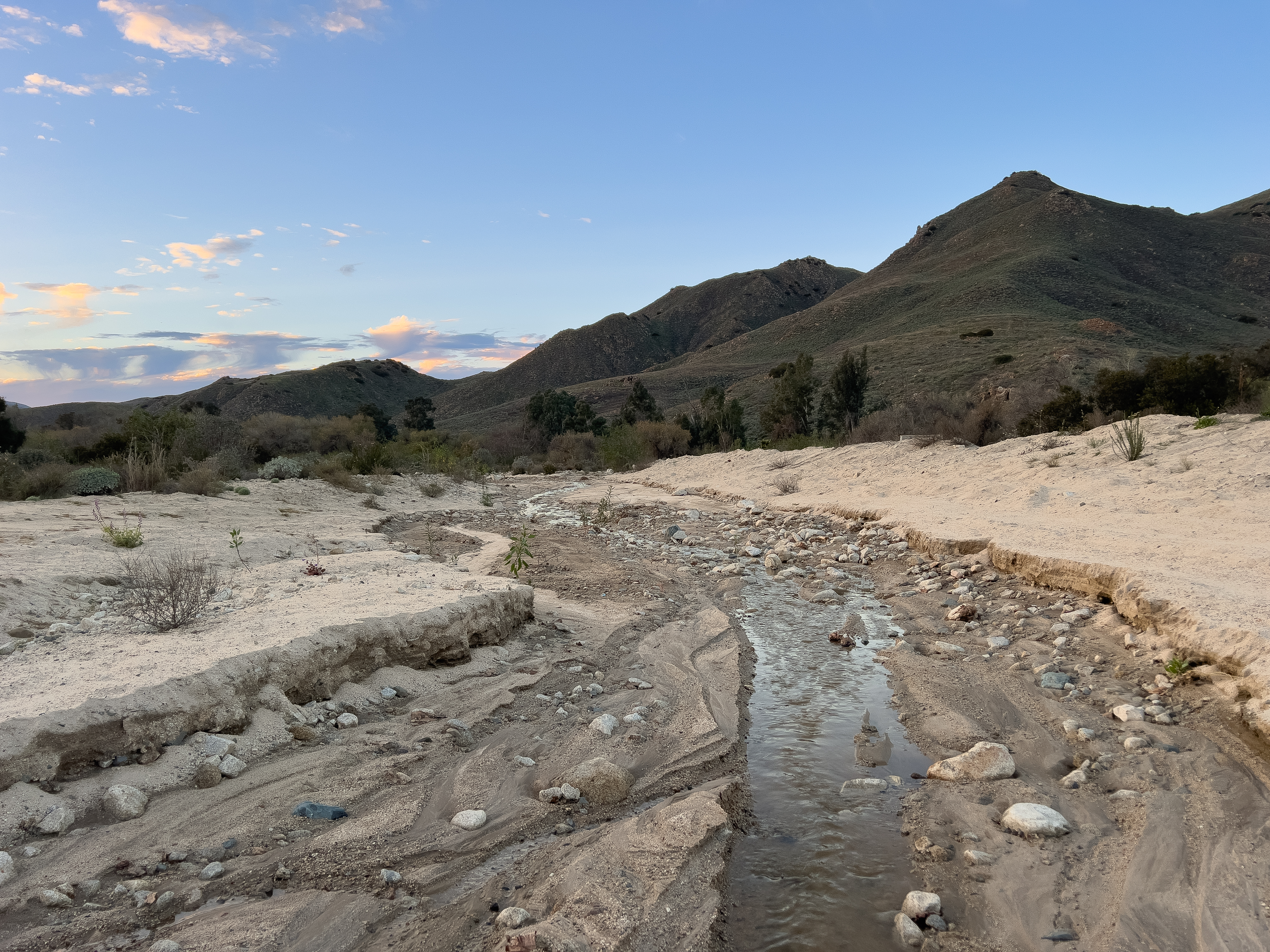
Estelle Mountain viewed from Temescal Valley
