= Lee Lake (Temescal Wash) =

- Location within California
- Location: Riverside County, California
- Coordinates: 33°44′51″N 117°26′28″W
- Type: reservoir
- Surface elevation: 1,122 feet (342 m)

Lee Lake, is a reservoir created by the Lee Lake 818-002 Dam across Temescal Creek, in Riverside County, California. It lies at an elevation of 1,122 feet (342 m).

== History ==
The large dam created a reservoir over the site of a small natural lake, called Lagunita, that already existed along the course of Temescal Creek in that location in the 19th century, and appears in an 1860 Temescal Survey Map.

In May, 1886 the South Riverside Land and Water Company was incorporated, and it purchased the lands of Rancho La Sierra of Bernardo Yorba, and the Rancho Temescal grant where the colony of South Riverside (later Corona) was laid out. They also secured the water rights to Temescal Creek, its tributaries and Lee Lake. Dams and pipelines were built to carry the water to the colony.

By the time the U. S. Geological Survey mapped the area in 1897-98 for the Elsinore Quadrangle, California the dam and Lee Lake appear on the map.

Recently it has been called Corona Lake by a fishing enterprise that operates there.
