= Clevelin Hills =

Range of hills in California

Coordinates: 33°40′50″N 117°21′05″W

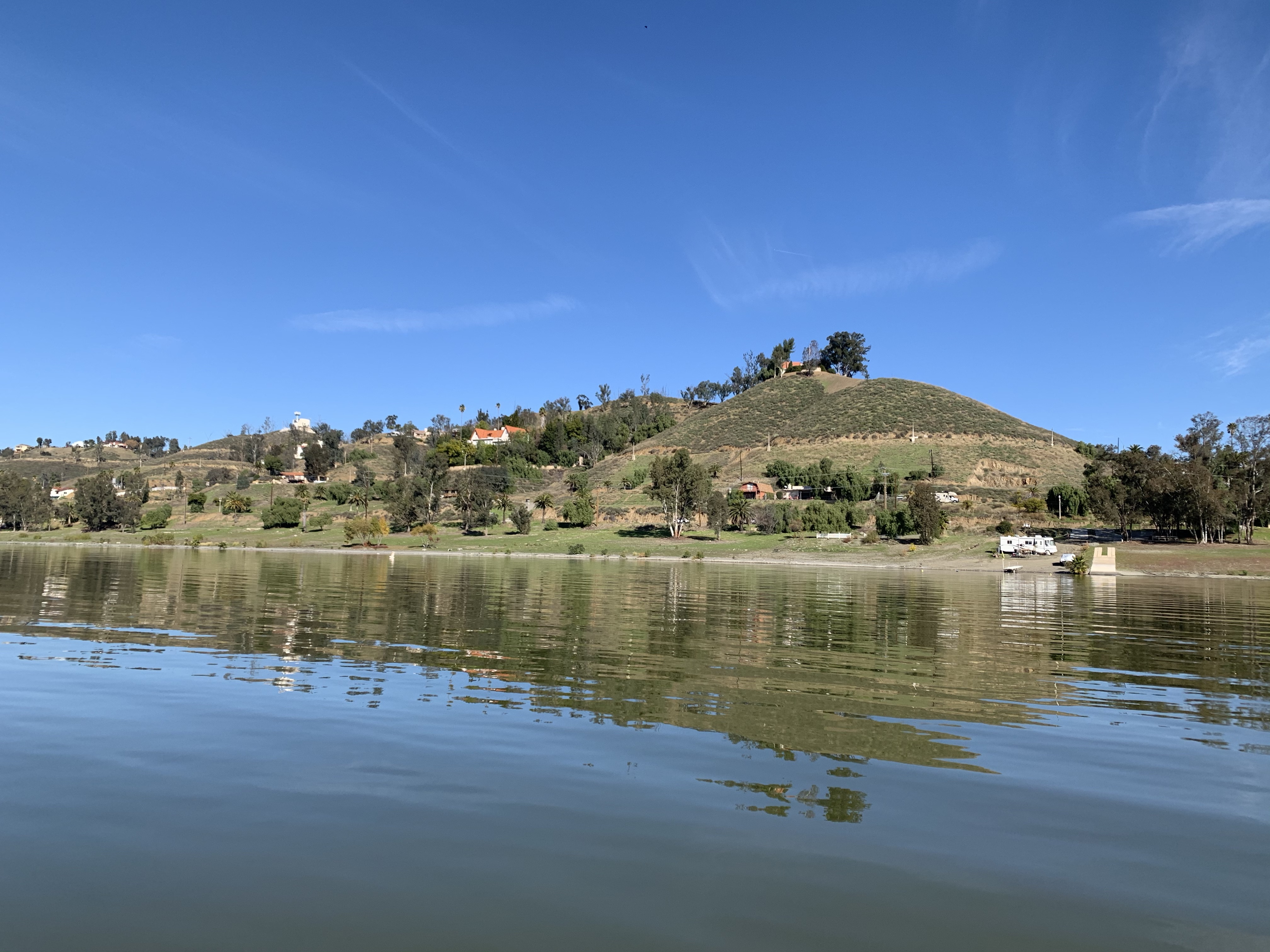

The Clevelin Hills are a range of hills in the Peninsular Ranges System, within the Temescal Mountains in western Riverside County, in southern California.

The hills range from an elevation of over 1,400 feet (430 m) in the southeastern section, to the range's high point of 1,835 feet (559 m) in elevation, in the northwestern section.

The Clevelin Hills are named for the leading developers of the Clevelin Corporation (Henry Cleveland Schultz and Abe Corlinsky) in the 1920s. These hills feature historic Clevelin Spanish-Mediterranean homes (designed by Architects Dickman & Simmons) and adorned with Hopi-inspired features and Italianate gardens (designed by Landscape Architect, Otto Gutkaes). Hundreds of Marbelite lampposts designed by mineral engineer and inventor, Henry Barkschat, have stood for over 100 years. These lampposts are constructed of centrifugally dried cement laden with sparkling white San Bernardino granite. Each evening the lamps on Lakeshore Drive illuminate what was once the Clevelin subdivision's lake front.

== Geology ==
The Clevelin Hills are the horst, on the edge of the Perris Block, thrown up on the northeast side of the graben of the Elsinore Valley, close to the shore of Lake Elsinore, along the Glen Ivy Fault.

The Clevelin Hills are composed of a number of different rock formations. In the southeast along the Lake Elsinore shore they are composed of Triassic Santa Ana Formation and Jurassic dacite and gabbro. To the northeast they are composed mostly of Lower Pleistocene or older fanglomerate underlain by Cretaceous grandiorite. There are exposures of Eocene Martinez Formation on its southwest slopes and northeast slopes. Some Santa Ana Formation rocks are found on the northwest end of the range, and at Canyon Lake.
