= Walker Canyon (Riverside County, California) =

Geography
- Location: Riverside County
- Country: United States
- State: California
- Coordinates: 33.7325°N 117.3933°W
- Interactive map of Walker Canyon

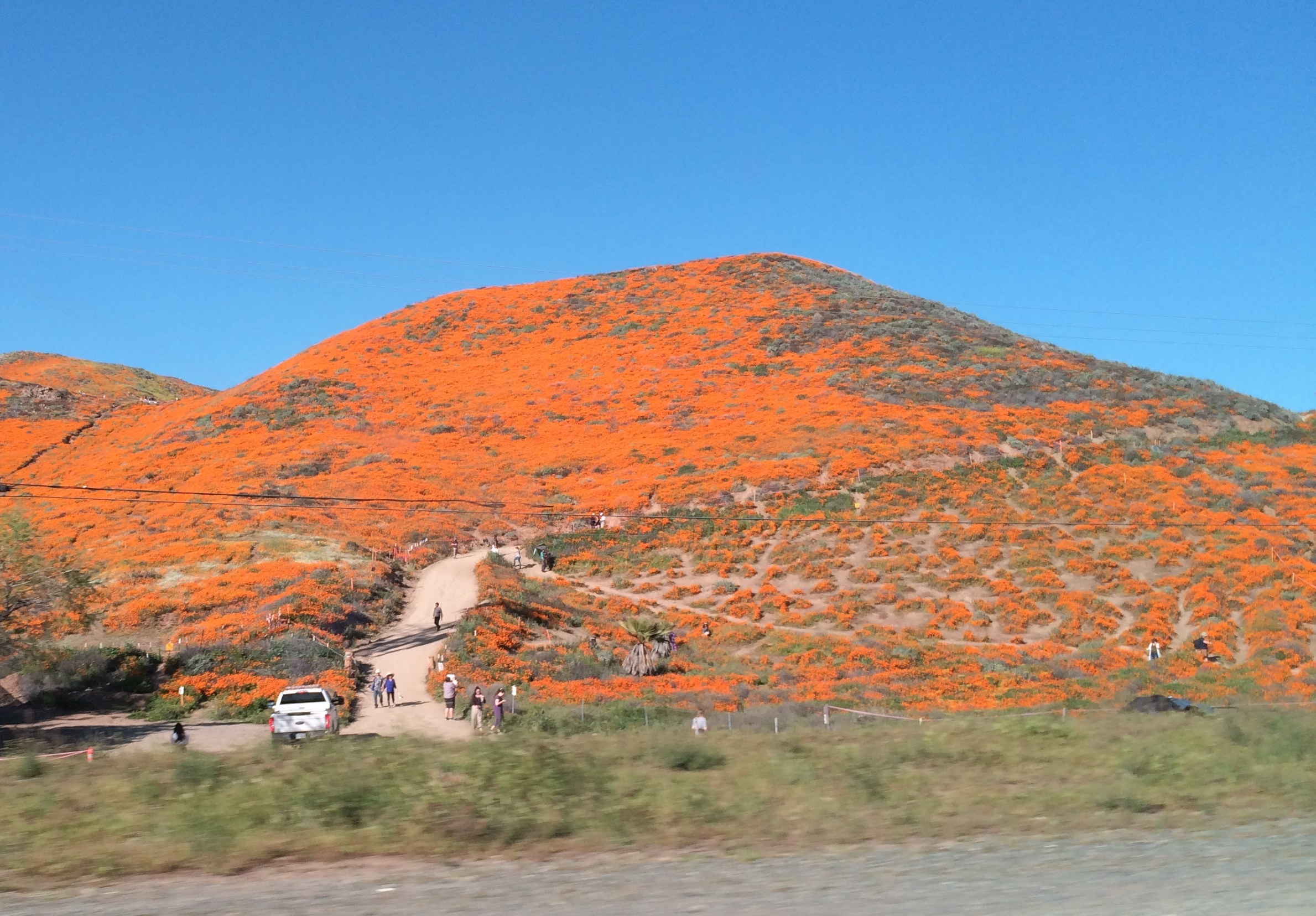
Walker Canyon on St. Patrick's Day 2019 during a super bloom

Walker Canyon is a canyon in the Temescal Mountains, in Riverside County, California. It lies divides Alberhill Summit, on the west and the balance of the range to its east. Temescal Creek flows northward through the canyon from where it heads at 33°42′33″N 117°21′43″W in Warm Springs Valley into the upper reach of the Temescal Valley near Alberhill, California. Coming from the Temescal Mountains to the east, Gavilan Wash has its confluence with Walker Canyon near mid way along its length, and Alberhill Canyon has its confluence with Walker Canyon at its mouth.

Near Lake Elsinore, California, I-15 passes between Temescal Valley and Warm Springs Valley through Walker Canyon on the east side of Temescal Creek.
