= Fuller Mill Creek =

Tributary of the North Fork of the San Jacinto River in Southern California

Location
- Country: United States
- State: California
- County: Riverside County

Physical characteristics
- Source
  - location: Fuller Ridge, Mount San Jacinto State Park
  - elevation: 7,800 ft (2,400 m)
- Mouth: North Fork of the San Jacinto River
  - location: Riverside County, California
  - coordinates: 33.7944°N 116.7501°W
- Length: 3.5 mi (5.6 km)

National Wild and Scenic River
- Type: Scenic, Recreational
- Designated: March 30, 2009

Fuller Mill Creek is a 3.5 mile long stream in the San Jacinto Mountains of Southern California. Its headwaters are in Mount San Jacinto State Park, near the Pacific Crest Trail, and the stream flows southwest until it joins the North Fork of the San Jacinto River.

In March 2009, the entire length of the stream was added to the National Wild and Scenic Rivers System as part of the Omnibus Public Land Management Act, with 0.9 miles classified as recreational and 2.6 miles classified as scenic, to be administered by the San Bernardino National Forest San Jacinto Ranger District. The stream was added to the system for its exceptional wildlife characteristics, as the stream and surrounding area are habitat for the endangered mountain yellow-legged frog, as well as the California spotted owl, rubber boa, and the San Bernardino flying squirrel.
