= Good Hope Mine =

Gold mine in California, United States

Coordinates: 33.7382°N 117.2862°W

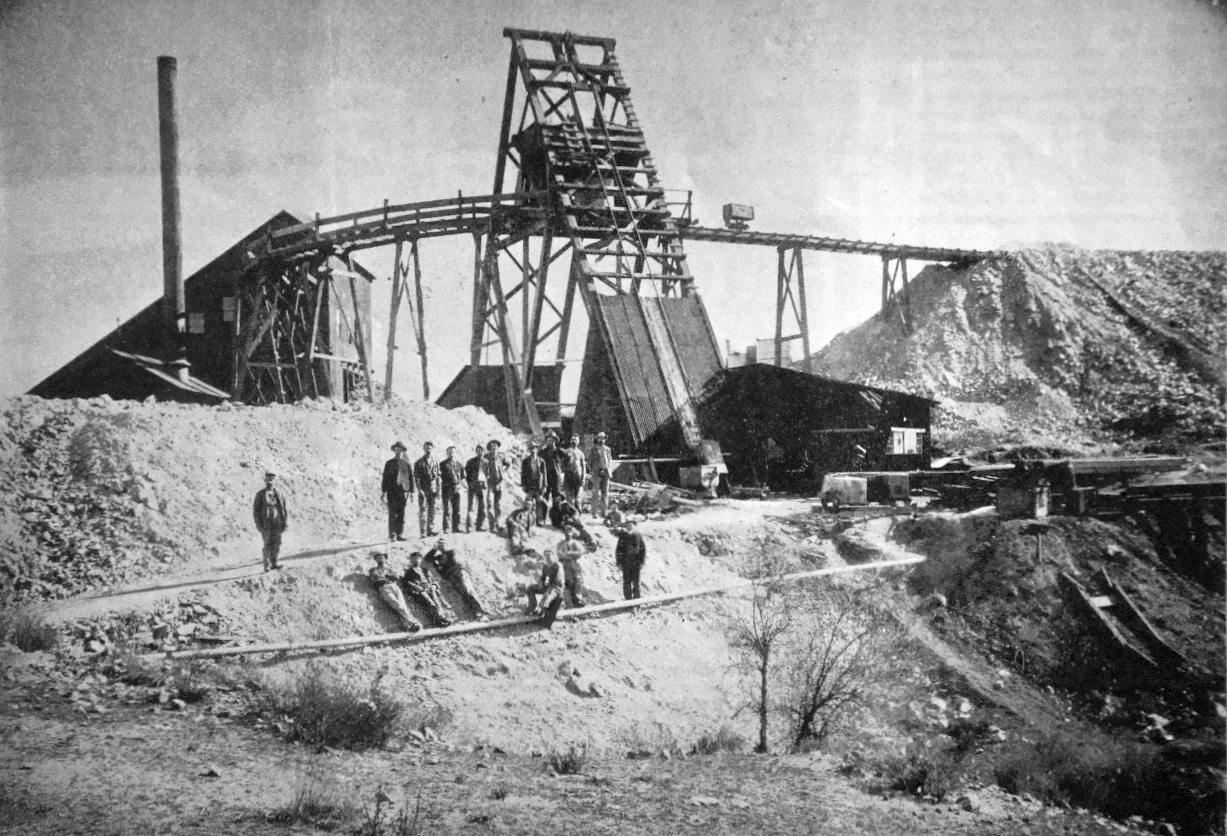
Good Hope Mine in 1907

Good Hope Mine was the principal gold mine in the Pinacate Mining District, Riverside County, California.

Good Hope Mine was reputedly begun by a Frenchman named Mache, although the washes in the area were originally placer mined by Mexicans in the 1850s during the California Gold Rush using arrastras. The Good Hope quartz vein was found in 1874. Americans later bought the mine and worked it.

The mine was worked to a depth of 575 feet, with several levels 100 feet apart below the 250 foot level. The first levels, at 250 and 350 feet, extended nearly 1,000 feet in length. The 450 foot level did not extend as far.

The formation in which the ore occurred is a fine, even-grained granodiorite. At the surface were several veins at distances varying from three to twenty feet. At greater depth, these branching fissures united to form an irregular vein, with a tendency to send off shoots into the surrounding rock, chiefly into the foot-wall side. The foot-wall streak often contained high grade ore. The auriferous iron sulfide was finely disseminated through the quartz.

In 1881 with the arrival of the California Southern Railroad nearby at Pinacate a five-stamp mill was constructed to crush the ore from the mine and developed the underground quartz deposit. In the 1890s an eastern corporation, the Good Hope Mining Company, took control and brought in a twenty stamp mill which was powered by coal from nearby Terra Cotta, California.

Ore from the Good Hope was one requiring fine crushing and very careful amalgamation and concentration. After the installation of the twenty stamp mill, water supplies were insufficient for efficient operation of the mill. The four concentrating machines were in operation, with very poor separation of sulfides. Under such conditions, it would have been better to run a ten stamp mill, which would have allowed greater extraction and increased net profits. As a result of the diminished efficiency, the tailings carried sufficient value to make them profitable to cyanide operators who subsequently worked them. Had there been less desire to maximize the volume of ore running through the mill and greater attention to efficiency, there would have remained little profit for the cyanide man.

The mine produced about $2 million in gold before 1896. The mine operated steadily until about 1903. An attempt was made in the 1930s by metallurgist James M. Hyde to reopen the mine. This effort was largely unsuccessful; the Good Hope Mine closed when it was flooded with underground water.

The mine site is located between Lake Elsinore and Perris just west of Highway 74 between Richard and Eugene Streets. The mine workers settled in the area which took the name of the mine and is now a populated place to the north called Good Hope.

== Sources ==
- Report of the State Mineralogist, California State Mining Bureau, State Office, 1893, pg. 384-385
- Tom Hudson, Lake Elsinore Valley, its story 1776-1977, 2nd Ed., Published by author, 1988. ISBN 0-931700-01-9
- Riverside County California Gold Production
