= Galivan, California =

Locale in Orange County, California, United States

Coordinates: 33°34′10″N 117°40′26″W

Galivan is a location in Orange County, California. Most Internet-based mapping services label Galivan as a neighborhood or small locale near the cities of Mission Viejo, Laguna Hills, and Laguna Niguel, about two miles north of the Interstate 5-California State Route 73 interchange. A California State Highway Map from 1960 from the Department of Public works, Division of Highways, shows Galivan 5 miles north of Highway 74. Coordinates for the location are 33.569, -117.674. While Galivan's status varies from map to map, it is almost always located at the spot where old U.S. Highway 101 (now Camino Capistrano) crossed over the Santa Fe railroad tracks.

Prior to the construction of Interstate 5, a two-lane road was sufficient to carry the traffic through the then-rural area. The "Galivan Overhead" transferred the highway from one side of the railroad tracks to the other. While the bridge no longer exists, the portion of old Highway 101 is still mostly intact, and a similar bridge (designed by the same architect) can be found in Del Mar, California, also on a portion of old Highway 101 crossing over the railroad tracks.

== Sources ==
- https://www.gbcnet.com/ushighways/US101/101pics5.html
- http://www.topozone.com/map.asp?lat=33.56944&mapit=Map+It&lon=-117.67361&size=m&s=25&datum=WGS84
- https://www.davidrumsey.com/luna/servlet/detail/RUMSEY~8~1~239537~5511858:State-Highway-Map,-California,-1960
