= Gavilan Peak =

Gavilan Peak may mean:

- Gavilán Peak (Southern California), in the Temescal Mountains, in Southern California.
- Gavilán Peak (Arizona)
- Fremont Peak (California), in the Gabilán Range in California. Previously called Gavilán Peak by the Spanish and Mexican colonists.
