= Gavilan Plateau =

Coordinates: 33°47′43″N 117°22′29″W

The Gavilan Plateau is a plateau in Riverside County, California. It lies at an elevation of 2083 feet on the north slope of the Temescal Mountains overlooking the Cajalco Valley south of Riverside, California.

== History ==
The Gavilan Hills and Gavilan Plateau were a site of gold mining soon after the beginning of California Gold Rush:

"Many small mining claims and camps were established starting as early as the mid-1850s, mostly by Spanish-speaking individuals. Some familiar names such as Trujillo and Robidoux from the New Mexican colony of Agua Mansa, figured heavily in mining interests there. In fact, one of the main camps was called Rancho de los Trujillos, and it was mentioned frequently in the various claims filed during these years."

In later years at the Gavilan Plateau, there was a small mining settlement of primarily Spanish speaking miners called Gavilan. Some English-speaking miners of the 1880s called it Cedar Flat. Subsequently, in 1891, M. C. Westbrook and Associates leased most of the mining area, planning a town site at the mines called Westbrook. Shortly afterward, it was sold to the Gavilan Mining and Milling Company for a period of ten years. The old town and its mines became known as the Gavilan Mine that can be seen on the 1898 Elsinore, California Quadrangle, U. S. Dept. of the Interior, Geological Survey Topographic Map.

Prior to the formation of Riverside County in 1893, the mines of the Gavilan Plateau and northwestern Gavilan Hills were organized as the Gavilan Mining District within the old boundaries of San Bernardino County, and the Pinacate Mining District in the central and southern Gavilan Hills within the old boundaries of San Diego County.
