= Plunge Creek =

Stream in North Slope Borough, Alaska, U.S.

Coordinates: 68°44′00″N 161°23′00″W

Plunge Creek is a stream in North Slope Borough, Alaska, in the United States. It is a tributary of Upikchak Creek.

Plunge Creek was so named from a nearby "plunging anticline".

== See also ==
- List of rivers of Alaska
