= Wild Horse Creek (Solano County) =

River in California, United States

Coordinates: 38°15′39.7″N 122°9′55.9″W

Wild Horse Creek is a small principal stream located in the Vaca Mountains within northern Solano County, California. It flows from Lake Madigan and Lake Frey, and joins with Green Valley Creek.
