= Middle Fork Lytle Creek =

Coordinates: 34°14′24″N 117°29′59″W

Middle Fork Lytle Creek is a tributary of Lytle Creek in San Bernardino County, California.
