= Cajon Wash =

Stream in San Bernardino County, California, US

Coordinates: 34°08′34″N 117°21′21″W

Cajon Wash is a tributary of Lytle Creek in San Bernardino County, California.
