= North Fork Lytle Creek =

River in the United States of America

Coordinates: 34°14′24″N 117°29′58″W

North Fork Lytle Creek is a tributary of Lytle Creek in San Bernardino County, California.
