= Sand Creek (San Bernardino County, California) =

River in California, United States

Coordinates: 34°07′24″N 117°13′48″W

Sand Creek is a tributary of Warm Creek in San Bernardino County, California.
