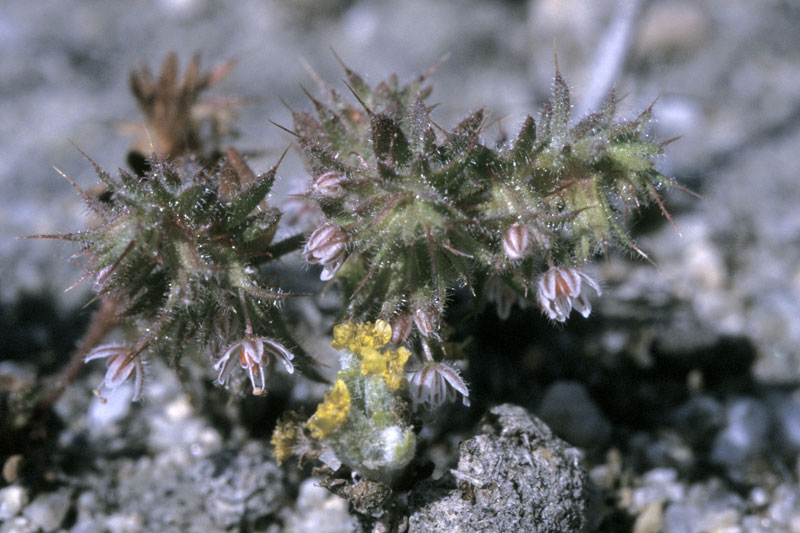

Conservation status
- Critically Imperiled (NatureServe)

Scientific classification
- Kingdom: Plantae
- Clade: Tracheophytes
- Clade: Angiosperms
- Clade: Eudicots
- Order: Caryophyllales
- Family: Polygonaceae
- Subfamily: Eriogonoideae
- Genus: Dodecahema; Reveal & Hardham, 1989
- Species: D. leptoceras

Binomial name
- Dodecahema leptoceras (A.Gray) Reveal & Hardham, 1989

Synonyms
- Centrostegia leptoceras A. Gray; Chorizanthe leptoceras (A. Gray) S. Watson

= Dodecahema =

Genus of flowering plants

Dodecahema is a genus of plants in the family Polygonaceae with a single species restricted to California, where it is an endangered species on the state and federal levels. Its common name is slender-horned spineflower. This is a small annual plant forming a patch of spreading basal leaves a few centimeters in diameter, or slightly larger when more moisture is available. It bolts an erect stalk upon which it bears inflorescences of flowers. Each group of white or pink flowers is enclosed in a tiny cup of fused bracts which is only a few millimeters wide. The fruit is a dark achene about 2 millimeters long.

This plant grows in the silt-rich floodplains and washes of the foothills of the Transverse Ranges and the Peninsular Ranges of southern California. It is known from fewer than 40 reported sightings, many of which were in locations that have since been claimed for development or otherwise altered. About 19 occurrences are believed to exist now. This plant has been recorded in only a few general areas, including Tujunga Wash and the floodlands surrounding the Santa Ana and San Jacinto Rivers. The main threats to this species include water diversion, off-road vehicles, invasive species of plants, and development on the private property where most occurrences of this plant are located.
