= Lake Elsinore =

Lake in Riverside County, California

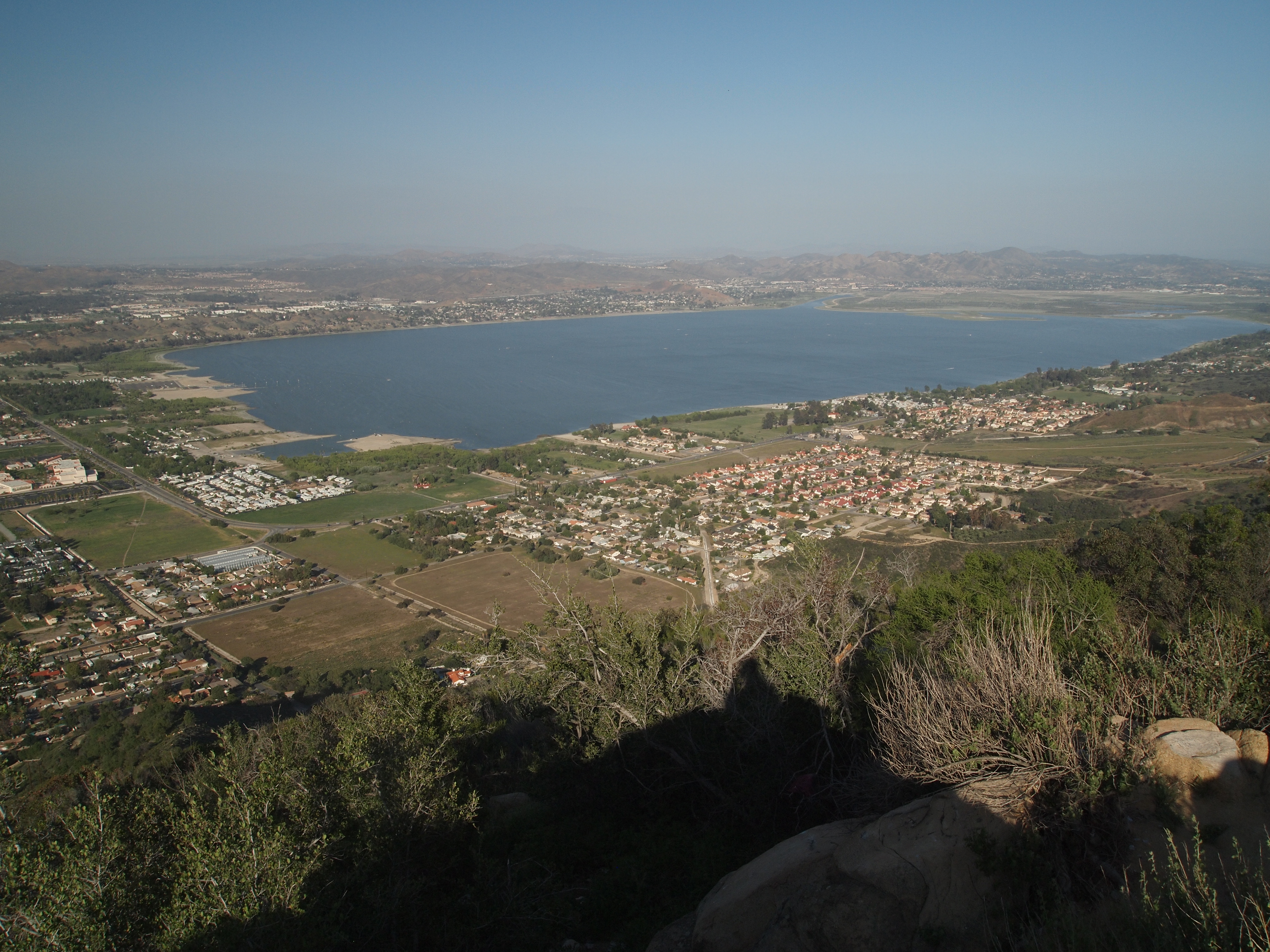
- Lake Elsinore as seen from the nearby Santa Ana Mountains

- Location within California Location within the United States
- Location: Riverside County, California
- Coordinates: 33°39′33″N 117°20′57″W
- Type: Sag pond
- Primary inflows: San Jacinto River, Leach Canyon, McVicker Canyon
- Primary outflows: Temescal Wash
- Catchment area: 750 mi^{2} (1,900 km^{2})
- Basin countries: United States
- Managing agency: City of Lake Elsinore
- Max. length: 6 mi (9.7 km) (max)
- Max. width: 1.5 mi (2.4 km) (max)
- Surface area: 2,993 acres (1,211 ha) (normal); 3,452 acres (1,397 ha) (full)
- Average depth: 27 ft (8.2 m)
- Max. depth: 42 ft (13 m)
- Water volume: 41,700 acre⋅ft (51,400 dam^{3}) (normal); 89,900 acre⋅ft (110,900 dam^{3}) (full)
- Shore length^{1}: 14 mi (23 km)
- Surface elevation: 1,240 ft (380 m) (normal); 1,255 ft (383 m) (full)
- Settlements: Lake Elsinore, Lakeland Village
- Website: www.lake-elsinore.org/city-hall/community-services/lake-recreation-and-fishing
- References: U.S. Geological Survey Geographic Names Information System: Lake Elsinore
- ^{1} Shore length is not a well-defined measure.

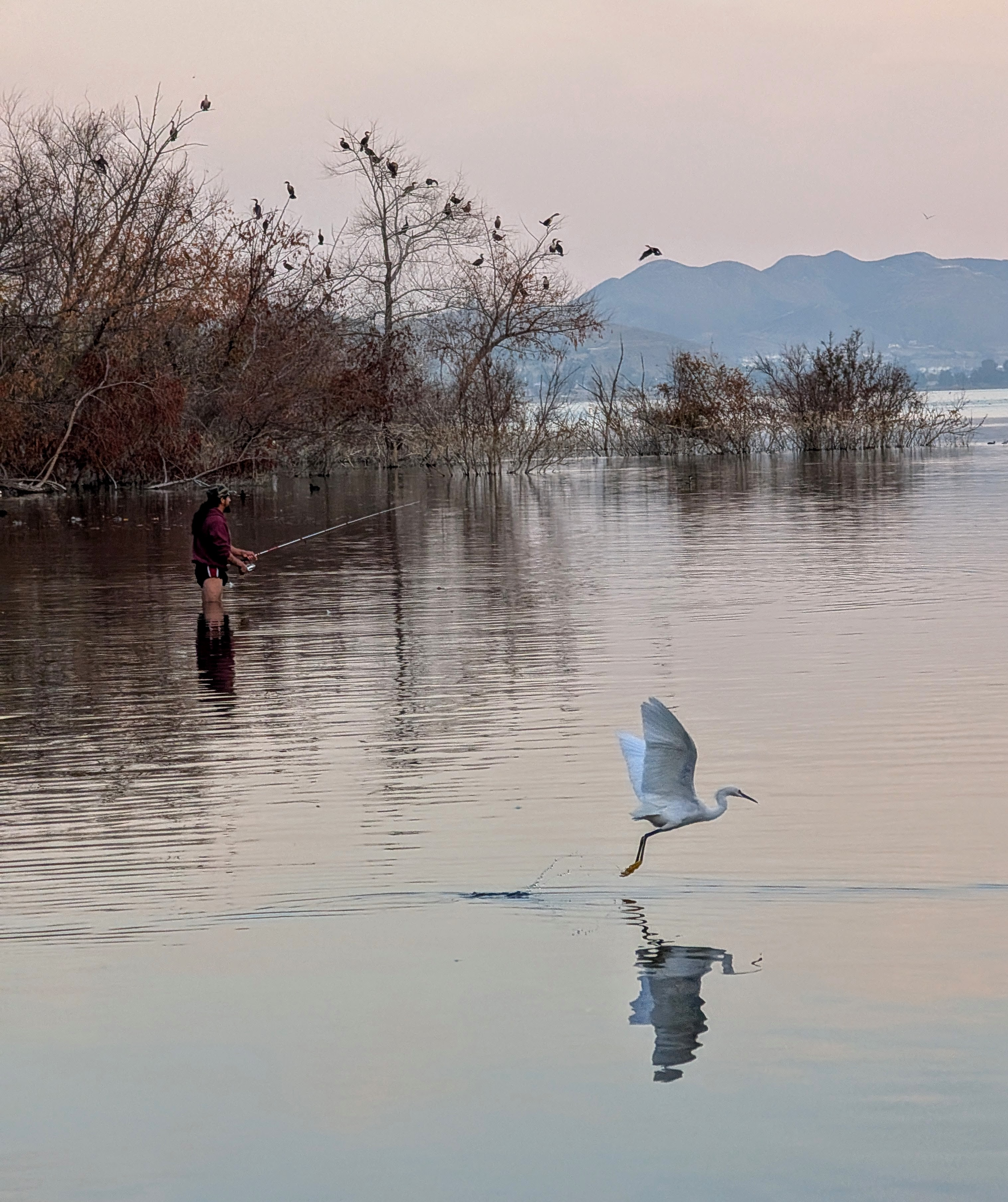
Egret, cormorants, and a fisherman at Lake Elsinore

Lake Elsinore is a natural freshwater lake in Riverside County, California, United States, located east of the Santa Ana Mountains and fed by the San Jacinto River. Originally named Laguna Grande by Spanish explorers, it was renamed for the town of Elsinore, established on its northeastern shore on April 9, 1888.

Lake water levels have fluctuated greatly from dry spells to flooding. Lake Elsinore was home to the Lake Shore Beach Club, an African American resort.

== Limnology ==
Lake Elsinore is the largest natural freshwater lake in Southern California. With its own 750-mi^{2} (1,900-km^{2}) watershed, it is situated at the lowest point within the San Jacinto River watershed of 750 sq mi (1,900 km^{2}), at the terminus of the San Jacinto River. It is the terminal lake of a partially closed basin called the San Jacinto Basin.

Lake water levels are healthy at an average of 1,244 ft (379 m) above sea level with a volume of 30,000 acre⋅ft (9.8 billion US gal; 37 billion L) which often fluctuates, although much has been done recently to prevent the lake from drying up, flooding, or becoming stagnant. When the lake's water level is 1,255 ft (383 m), it spills into the outflow channel on its northeastern shore, known as Temescal Wash, flowing northwest through Temescal Canyon and feeding Alberhill Creek which joins Temescal Creek. The Temescal Creek in turn dumps into the Santa Ana River just northwest of Corona, California.

=== Lake history ===
Lake Elsinore was seen by the Spanish Franciscan padre Juan Santiago, exploring eastward from the Mission San Juan Capistrano in 1797. In 1810, the water level of the Laguna Grande was first described by a traveler as being little more than a swamp about a mile long. Later in the early 19th century, the lake grew larger, providing Mexican rancheros, American trappers, the expedition of John C. Frémont, and the immigrants during the California Gold Rush a spot to camp and water their animals as they traveled along the southern shore of the lake on what later became the Southern Emigrant Trail and the route of the Butterfield Overland Mail. The lake and the Laguna Rancho adobe built near the lake on its southwest shore at its western corner was described by Benjamin Ignatius Hayes, who stayed there overnight on January 27–28, 1850:

In about 15 miles reach some timber where the hills approach near, apparently the termination of the valley of Temecula, a sort of low divide over which we enter into another valley. In both these is much good soil, although in the latter more of the wiry grass and more marshy, some little evergreen oak among the hills.

Come to the Laguna, two miles from the divide. Some good young grass, great deal of elder on its banks; as we rode along frequent flocks of geese rose from the shore; many shots at them; none brought down. The water of the Laguna is saltish, the animals cannot drink it; if they could, such a sheet of fresh water here would be invaluable to the owner of this land. As we were moving along the lake, an Indian overtook us, running as if to catch up with us; said he was from Temecula and going to the mines; had a little pinole tied up in a handkerchief; spoke Spanish, seemed disposed to be communicative.

At sunset the moon rises behind the snowy peaks to the eastward and is reflected on the lake. Wild sage; the lake has evidently once, near the house, been with a much broader basin. How is it supplied with water? Clover around it. The house is a substantial adobe. A small stream seems to enter it on the east. A low range of hills nearly surrounds the lake, higher where we are encamped on the southern side. The lake valley seems to be higher than that of Temecula…Two or three men at this house; their wives seem to be Indians.

Road firm and good, gently ascending for a mile or more from the lake; then uneven, occasionally sandy, to Temescal.

As a result of the Great Flood of 1862, the level of the lake was very high, and the Union Army created a post at the lake to graze and water their horses. In the great 1862–65 drought, most of the cattle in Southern California died and the lake level fell, especially during 1866 and 1867, when practically no rain fell. However, the lake was full again in 1872, when it overflowed down its outlet through Temescal Canyon. After 1872, the lake again evaporated to a very low level, but the great rains in the winter of 1883–84 filled it to overflowing in three weeks. Descriptions of the lake at this time say that large willow trees surrounding the former low-water shore line stood 20 ft (6.1 m) or more below the high-water level and were of such size that they must have been 30 or more years old. Indications are that the high water of the 1860s and 1870s must have been of a very short duration.

The rainfall until 1893 was greater than normal, and the lake remained high and overflowed naturally on three or four occasions during that time. The lake water was purchased by the Temescal Water Company for the irrigation of land in Corona. Its outlet channel was deepened, permitting gravity flow down the natural channel of Temescal Canyon to Corona for a year or more after the water level sank below the natural elevation of its outlet. As the lake surface continued to recede, a pumping plant was installed, and pumping was continued a few seasons, but the concentration of salts in the lake, due to the evaporation and lack of rainfall, soon made the water unfit for irrigation, and the project was abandoned by the company. After 1893, the lake's water level sank almost continuously for nearly 10 years, with a slight rise every winter. Heavier precipitation, beginning in 1903, gradually filled the lake to about half the depth above its minimum level since 1883. Then in January, 1916, a flood rapidly raised the level to overflowing.

The lake hosted teams for Olympic training and high-speed boat racing in the 1920s. It went dry in the mid-1930s, but refilled by 1938. The lake ran dry during most of the 1950s and was refilled in the early 1960s. More than a week of heavy rains in 1980 flooded the lake, destroying surrounding homes and businesses. Since then a multimillion-dollar project has been put into place to maintain the water at a consistent level, allowing for homes to be built close to the lake. In 2007, an aeration system was added to prevent fish kills in the lake's ecosystem. A series of storms in February 2024, brought the lake to 1,248 ft, a 25 year high.

== Description ==
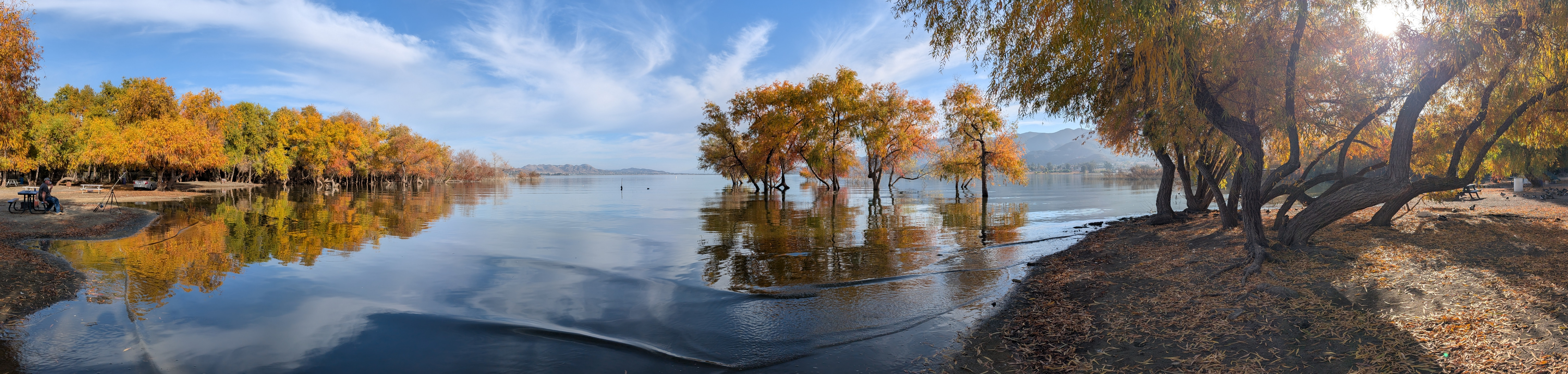
Panoramic view of Lake Elsinore from northwest shore

Lake Elsinore sits in a basin, the Elsinore Valley which is a graben rift valley and part of the Elsinore Trough. It is the largest sag pond in the Elsinore Fault Zone. It lies beyond the northwestern extremity of the Temecula Valley, cut off from its Santa Margarita River watershed by a slight ridge running across the valley south of the lake between the Sedco Hills and the Elsinore Mountains to the west, part of the larger Santa Ana Mountain Range to the west and northwest of the valley. On the west side of the lake are many small arroyos like the Lakeland Village Channel, which drains canyons whose source is on the east slope of the Elsinore Mountains. Lake Elsinore's northwestern shore rises to the foothills of the Santa Ana Mountains and the saddle between them and the Clevelin Hills, which closely enclose the lake along its northeastern shore until they decline and end short near the shore of the Temescal Creek outlet from the lake that passes through downtown Lake Elsinore. Two of its larger tributaries come into the north shore of the lake from the Santa Ana Mountains, Leach Canyon Creek, and McVicker Canyon Creek.

The lake south of the Temescal Creek outlet lies in an open area at the mouth of its major tributary, the San Jacinto River, distantly bounded to the east by the Tuscany Hills and south of the river by the Sedco Hills both part of the range of the Temescal Mountains. Much of the lake basin has been cut off from the lake and river by a flood-control levee, which only permits the isolated section to fill after an extremely large rainfall event raises the lake over the level of the overflow spillway, north of the baseball stadium.

=== Discharge ===
Lake Elsinore Valley and the San Jacinto Basin which is its tributary, is a partially closed drainage basin and part of the Great Basin Divide. Its watershed is normally endorheic, but sometimes flows into the Santa Ana River watershed during periods of high water after heavy rainfall or snow melt. It discharges water through the Elsinore Spillway Channel outlet to Temescal Creek when the lake reaches the level of the outlet at 1,255 ft (383 m). Temescal Creek, flows through Warm Springs Valley and Walker Canyon into the Temescal Wash, which in turn flows through the northern Elsinore Trough to the Santa Ana River in such conditions. In recent years, efforts to maintain the lake at a stable high level have made the flows occur more frequently and for a longer duration during the year.

== See also ==
- List of lakes in California
