= Lytle Creek (California) =

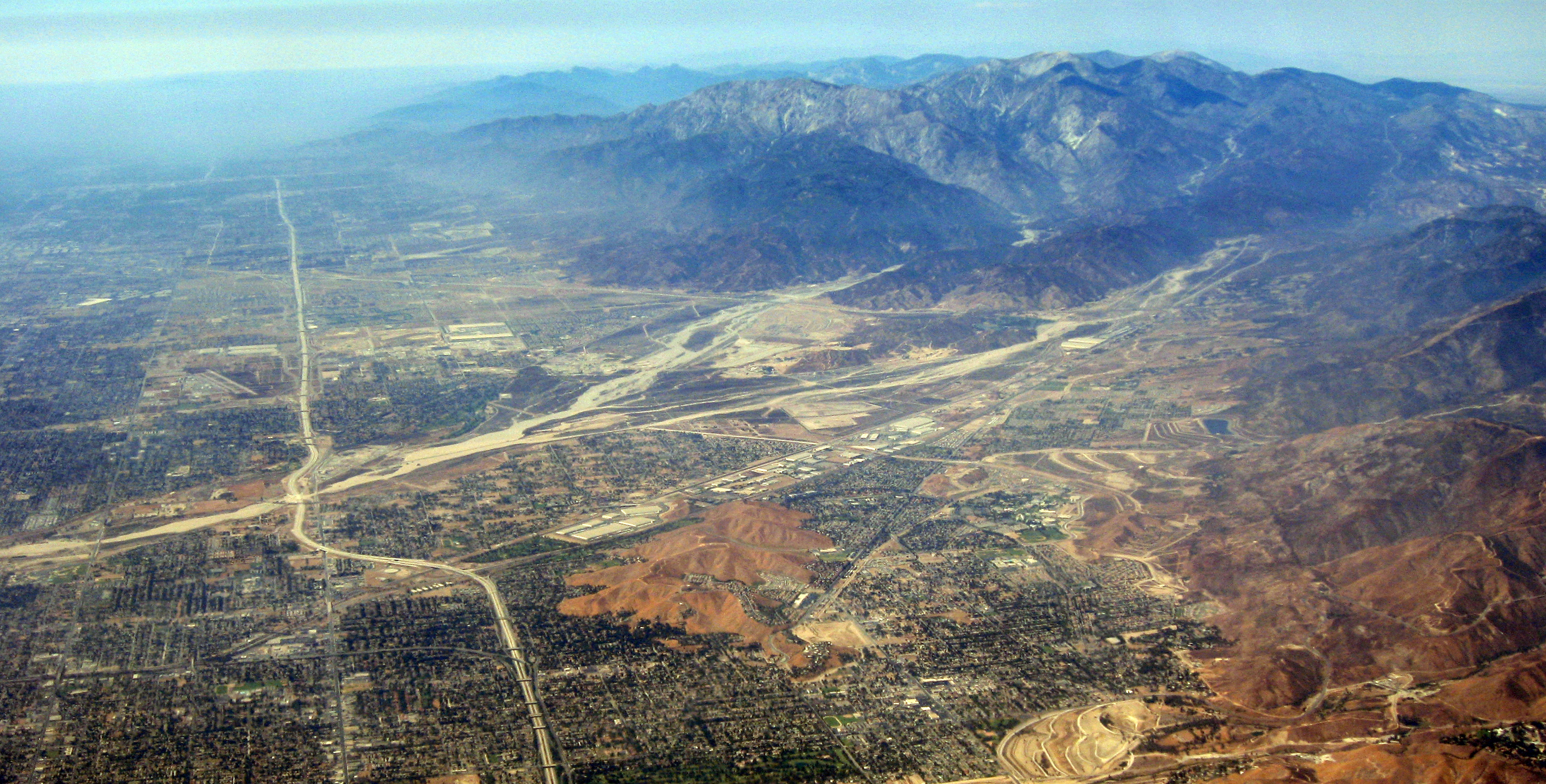
- Lytle Creek and its tributary, Cajon Wash, flowing out of the San Gabriel Mountains.

Location
- Country: United States

Physical characteristics
- Mouth
  - location: Santa Ana River
  - coordinates: 34.0816792°N 117.2964319°W
  - elevation: 981 ft (299 m)
- Discharge
  - average: 137 cu ft/s (3.9 m^{3}/s)

Basin features
- Tributaries
  - left: North Fork Lytle Creek
  - right: Middle Fork Lytle Creek, South Fork Lytle Creek

Lytle Creek, California, is an approximately 18-mile-long (29 km) stream in southwestern San Bernardino County near the city of San Bernardino. It is a tributary of Warm Creek, a tributary of the Santa Ana River. The Mormon settlers of San Bernardino named the stream "Lytle Creek" after their leader, Captain Andrew Lytle. The Tongva village of Wa’aachnga was located along Lytle Creek.

== Lytle Creek Watershed ==
Lytle Creek flows through the eastern San Gabriel Mountains and has three forks, the North, Middle and South forks. The source of the creek is at the confluence of the North Fork and Middle Fork Lytle Creek, just west of the town of Lytle Creek, California 34°14′24″N 117°29′55″W. South Fork Lytle Creek joins Lytle Creek soon afterward on the right 34°14′04″N 117°29′39″W. As the creek emerges from the mountains, about where Glen Helen Parkway crosses the creek 34°11′24″N 117°25′58″W, the Lytle Creek Wash begins 34°11′24″N 117°25′59″W. At the lower end of the wash 34°06′28″N 117°20′00″W, there is the old Lower Lytle Creek channel, that has been artificially canalized which splits off to the east, while an additional artificial diversion channel, the smaller Lytle Creek Channel 34°05′39″N 117°19′29″W, continues southeastward to rejoin the waters of Lytle Creek in the reach of Warm Creek near its mouth at Knoll Park 34°4′27″N 117°18′13″W. The lower creek has its conjunction with the artificial channel of Warm Creek, 1 mile before Warm Creek joins the Santa Ana River. Below this conjunction, the Lytle Creek Channel merges with the Warm Creek channel at Knoll Park just before it joins the river .

Several moderate-to-large-sized cities (Fontana, Rialto, Colton, and San Bernardino-the largest) are built on the ancient alluvial fan sediments left behind by Lytle Creek.

- Lytle Creek
  - -- mouth of Lytle Creek Wash, head of artificial channels, confluence with the Santa Ana River
  - Cajon Wash
    - Cable Creek
    - Lone Pine Creek
    - Crowder Creek
  - -- head of Lytle Creek Wash, mouth of the upper reach of Lytle Creek
  - Grapevine Canyon Creek
  - Meyer Canyon Creek
  - -- Miller Narrows
  - South Fork Lytle Creek
    - Bonita Creek
  - Middle Fork Lytle Creek
  - North Fork Lytle Creek
    - Coldwater Canyon Creek
    - Paiute Canyon
    - Dog Bone Canyon

== Hydroelectric Power ==
Southern California Edison has a 600-kW hydroelectric plant on the stream at Miller Narrows at an elevation of 2795 feet34°13′56″N 117°29′11″W. It is a run-of-the-river plant. A diversion dam sends the water through a turbine, which is returned to the streambed further downstream.
