= Valle Vista, California =

- Unincorporated area Census-designated place
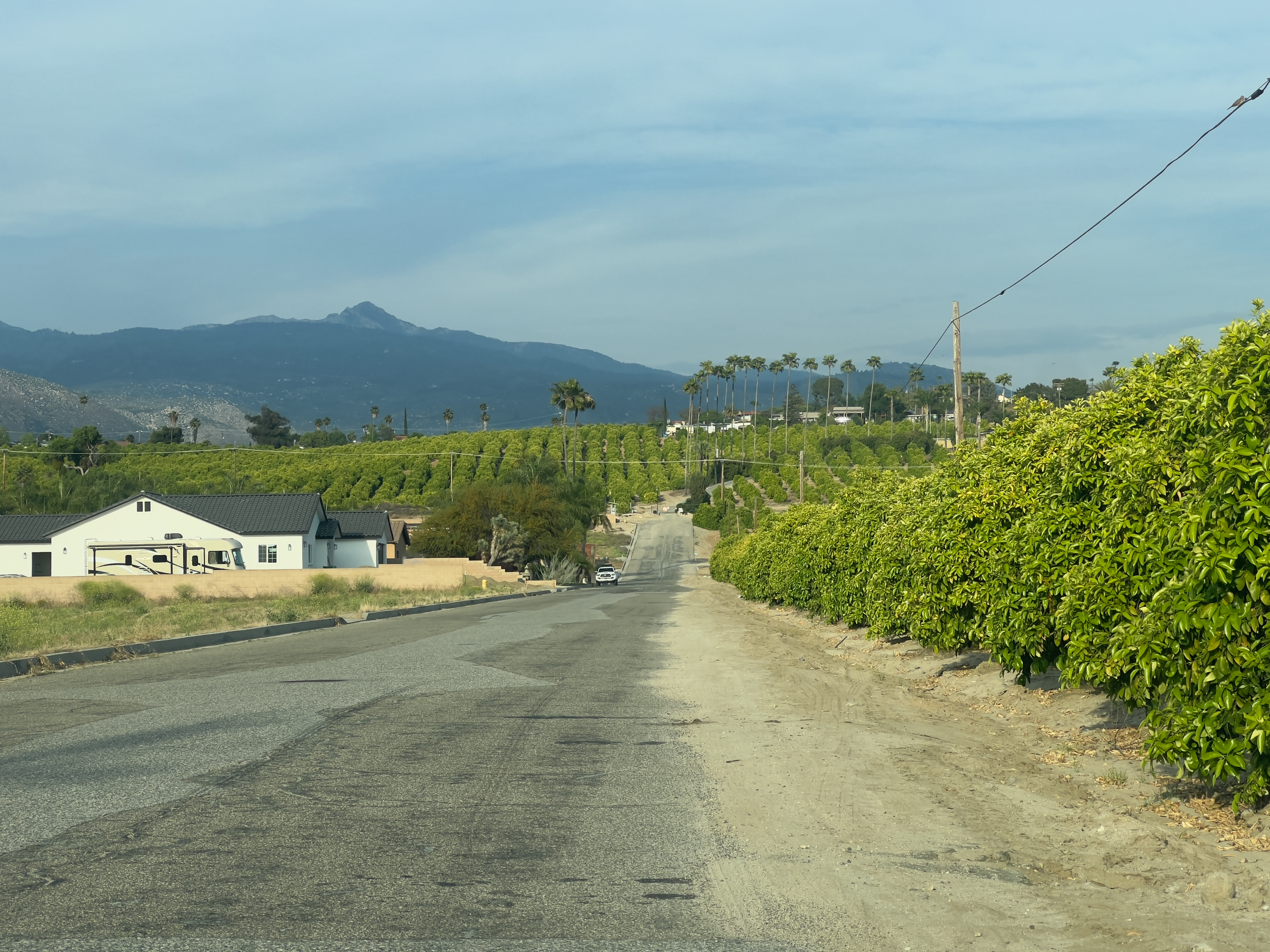
- Orange groves and view of San Jacinto Mountains in Valle Vista, California
- Interactive map of Valle Vista, California
- Location in the United States
- Coordinates: 33°44′52″N 116°53′36″W
- Country: United States
- State: California
- County: Riverside

Area
  - Total: 7.070 sq mi (18.312 km^{2})
  - Land: 6.862 sq mi (17.772 km^{2})
  - Water: 0.208 sq mi (0.540 km^{2}) 2.94%
- Elevation: 1,775 ft (541 m)

Population (2020)
  - Total: 16,194
  - Density: 2,360.0/sq mi (911.21/km^{2})
- Time zone: UTC-8 (PST)
  - Summer (DST): UTC-7 (PDT)
- ZIP code: 92544
- Area codes: 909, 951
- FIPS code: 06-81708
- GNIS feature ID: 1652805

Valle Vista (Spanish for "View Valley") is an unincorporated area in the Inland Empire region of Riverside County, California, United States and is located in the San Jacinto Valley. Valle Vista is adjacent to and east of the cities of San Jacinto and Hemet. The population was 16,194 at the 2020 census, up from 11,036 at the 2010 census. For statistical purposes, the United States Census Bureau has defined Valle Vista as a census-designated place (CDP).

== Geography ==
According to the United States Census Bureau, the CDP has a total area of 7.1 square miles (18 km^{2}), of which, 6.9 square miles (18 km^{2}) of it is land and 0.2 square miles (0.52 km^{2}) of it (2.94%) is water.

=== Climate ===
Valle Vista, generally has year-round pleasant weather, with hot summers and mild, wet winters. On average, the warmest month is August. The highest recorded temperature was 115 °F (46 °C) in 2004. On average, the coolest month is December. The lowest recorded temperature was 9 °F (−13 °C) in 1974. The maximum average precipitation occurs in February.

Climate data for Valle Vista, Ca
Month	Jan	Feb	Mar	Apr	May	Jun	Jul	Aug	Sep	Oct	Nov	Dec	Year
Record high °F (°C)	91 (33)	90 (32)	99 (37)	103 (39)	110 (43)	111 (44)	114 (46)	115 (46)	112 (44)	104 (40)	95 (35)	90 (32)	114 (46)
Mean daily maximum °F (°C)	67 (19)	67 (19)	71 (22)	74 (23)	80 (27)	89 (32)	96 (36)	98 (37)	93 (34)	83 (28)	73 (23)	66 (19)	80 (27)
Mean daily minimum °F (°C)	37 (3)	39 (4)	43 (6)	46 (8)	51 (11)	56 (13)	61 (16)	62 (17)	56 (13)	51 (11)	42 (6)	36 (2)	48 (9)
Record low °F (°C)	9 (−13)	19 (−7)	26 (−3)	31 (−1)	37 (3)	41 (5)	46 (8)	44 (7)	42 (6)	31 (−1)	24 (−4)	13 (−11)	9 (−13)
Average precipitation inches (mm)	2.69 (68)	2.79 (71)	1.92 (49)	0.80 (20)	0.40 (10)	0.09 (2.3)	0.18 (4.6)	0.17 (4.3)	0.32 (8.1)	0.61 (15)	0.90 (23)	1.74 (44)	12.61 (320)

== Demographics ==
Historical population
Census	Pop.	Note	%±
1980	5,474		—
1990	8,751		59.9%
2000	10,488		19.8%
2010	14,578		39.0%
2020	16,194		11.1%
U.S. Decennial Census; 1860–1870 1880-1890; 1900 1910 1920; 1930 1940 1950; 1960 1970 1980; 1990 2000 2010

Valle Vista first appeared as a census designated place in the 1980 U.S. census.

=== Racial and ethnic composition ===
Valle Vista CDP, California – Racial and ethnic composition Note: the US Census treats Hispanic/Latino as an ethnic category. This table excludes Latinos from the racial categories and assigns them to a separate category. Hispanics/Latinos may be of any race.
Race / Ethnicity (NH = Non-Hispanic)	Pop 2000	Pop 2010	Pop 2020	% 2000	% 2010	% 2020
White alone (NH)	8,408	9,378	7,371	80.17%	64.33%	45.52%
Black or African American alone (NH)	125	391	734	1.19%	2.68%	4.53%
Native American or Alaska Native alone (NH)	97	125	147	0.92%	0.86%	0.91%
Asian alone (NH)	135	265	276	1.29%	1.82%	1.70%
Native Hawaiian or Pacific Islander alone (NH)	14	30	27	0.13%	0.21%	0.17%
Other race alone (NH)	12	20	65	0.11%	0.14%	0.40%
Mixed race or Multiracial (NH)	158	342	669	1.51%	2.35%	4.13%
Hispanic or Latino (any race)	1,539	4,027	6,905	14.67%	27.62%	42.64%
Total	10,488	14,578	16,194	100.00%	100.00%	100.00%

=== 2020 census ===
As of the 2020 census, Valle Vista had a population of 16,194 and a population density of 2,348.3 inhabitants per square mile (906.7/km^{2}).

The median age was 40.3 years. About 23.6% of residents were under the age of 18, 7.9% were aged 18 to 24, 23.6% were aged 25 to 44, 25.8% were aged 45 to 64, and 19.2% were 65 years of age or older. For every 100 females there were 93.3 males, and for every 100 females age 18 and over there were 92.6 males age 18 and over.

The census reported that 99.8% of the population lived in households, 25 people (0.2%) lived in non-institutionalized group quarters, and 8 people (0.0%) were institutionalized. 96.1% of residents lived in urban areas, while 3.9% lived in rural areas.

There were 5,705 households in Valle Vista, of which 31.7% had children under the age of 18 living in them. Of all households, 46.2% were married-couple households, 8.0% were cohabiting couple households, 18.4% were households with a male householder and no spouse or partner present, and 27.4% were households with a female householder and no spouse or partner present. About 25.3% of all households were made up of individuals and 14.7% had someone living alone who was 65 years of age or older. The average household size was 2.83, and there were 3,927 families (68.8% of all households).

There were 6,051 housing units at an average density of 877.5 units per square mile (338.8 units/km^{2}), of which 5,705 (94.3%) were occupied. Of occupied units, 74.5% were owner-occupied and 25.5% were occupied by renters. Of all housing units, 5.7% were vacant. The homeowner vacancy rate was 2.0% and the rental vacancy rate was 4.1%.

Racial composition as of the 2020 census
Race	Number	Percent
White	8,774	54.2%
Black or African American	824	5.1%
American Indian and Alaska Native	380	2.3%
Asian	316	2.0%
Native Hawaiian and Other Pacific Islander	42	0.3%
Some other race	3,229	19.9%
Two or more races	2,629	16.2%

=== 2023 estimates ===
In 2023, the US Census Bureau estimated that 16.1% of the population were foreign-born. Of all people aged 5 or older, 70.2% spoke only English at home, 27.4% spoke Spanish, 0.7% spoke other Indo-European languages, 1.0% spoke Asian or Pacific Islander languages, and 0.8% spoke other languages. Of those aged 25 or older, 79.0% were high school graduates and 14.8% had a bachelor's degree.

The median household income was $61,799, and the per capita income was $28,404. About 14.2% of families and 18.3% of the population were below the poverty line.

== Government ==
In the California State Legislature, Valle Vista is in the 19th senatorial district, represented by Republican Rosilicie Ochoa Bogh, and the 47th Assembly district, represented by Republican Greg Wallis.

In the United States House of Representatives, Valle Vista is in California's 25th congressional district, represented by Democrat Raul Ruiz.

== Parks and recreation ==
Deputy Brett M. Harris Park is a county park at 25175 Fairview Ave named after a member of the Riverside County Sheriff's Department who served the community. He died from a traffic crash while on duty.

== Education ==
It is in the Hemet Unified School District.
