= South Fork Lytle Creek =

Waterway in San Bernardino County, CA

Coordinates: 34°14′04″N 117°29′39″W

South Fork Lytle Creek is a tributary of Lytle Creek in San Bernardino County, California near the eastern edge of the San Gabriel Mountains.
