= San Jacinto River (California) =

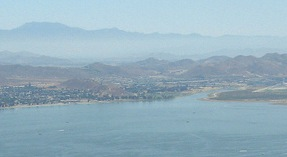
- The mouth of the San Jacinto on Lake Elsinore, viewed from California State Route 74 (Ortega Highway) on the southwest side of the lake

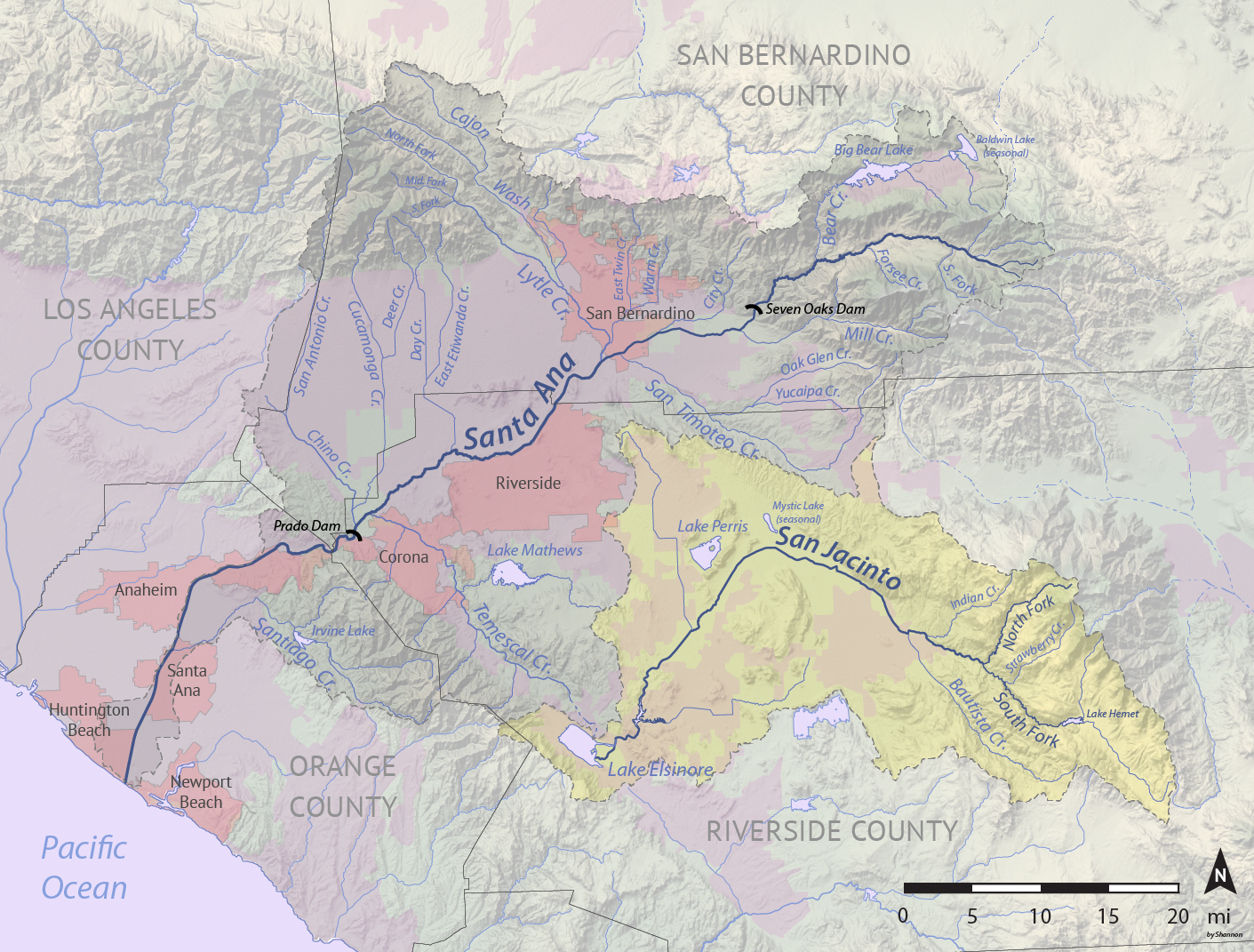
- Map of the Santa Ana River watershed with the San Jacinto subbasin highlighted in yellow.

Location
- Country: United States
- State: California
- Region: Riverside County
- Cities: Hemet, San Jacinto, Perris, Lake Elsinore

Physical characteristics
- Source: San Jacinto Mountains
  - location: San Bernardino National Forest, Riverside County
  - coordinates: 33°43′52″N 116°48′36″W
  - elevation: 2,100 ft (640 m)
- Mouth: Lake Elsinore
  - location: Lake Elsinore, at the mouth of Railroad Canyon, northwest of the Sedco Hills and west of the Tuscany Hills of the Temescal Mountains, Riverside County
  - coordinates: 33°38′45.06″N 117°18′53.42″W
  - elevation: 1,243 ft (379 m)
- Length: 42 mi (68 km), Northwest then southwest
- Basin size: 780 sq mi (2,000 km^{2})
- Discharge
  - average: 16.4 cu ft/s (0.46 m^{3}/s)
  - minimum: 0 cu ft/s (0 m^{3}/s)
  - maximum: 16,000 cu ft/s (450 m^{3}/s)

Basin features
- River system: Santa Ana River basin
- Tributaries
  - left: South Fork San Jacinto River
  - right: North Fork San Jacinto River

National Wild and Scenic River
- Type: Wild, Scenic, Recreational
- Designated: March 30, 2009

The San Jacinto River is a 42-mile-long (68 km) river in Riverside County, California. The river's headwaters are in Santa Rosa and San Jacinto Mountains National Monument. The lower portion of the 765-square-mile (1,980 km^{2}) watershed is urban and agricultural land. As a partially endorheic watershed that is contiguous with other Great Basin watersheds, the western side of the San Jacinto Basin is a portion of the Great Basin Divide.

== Course ==
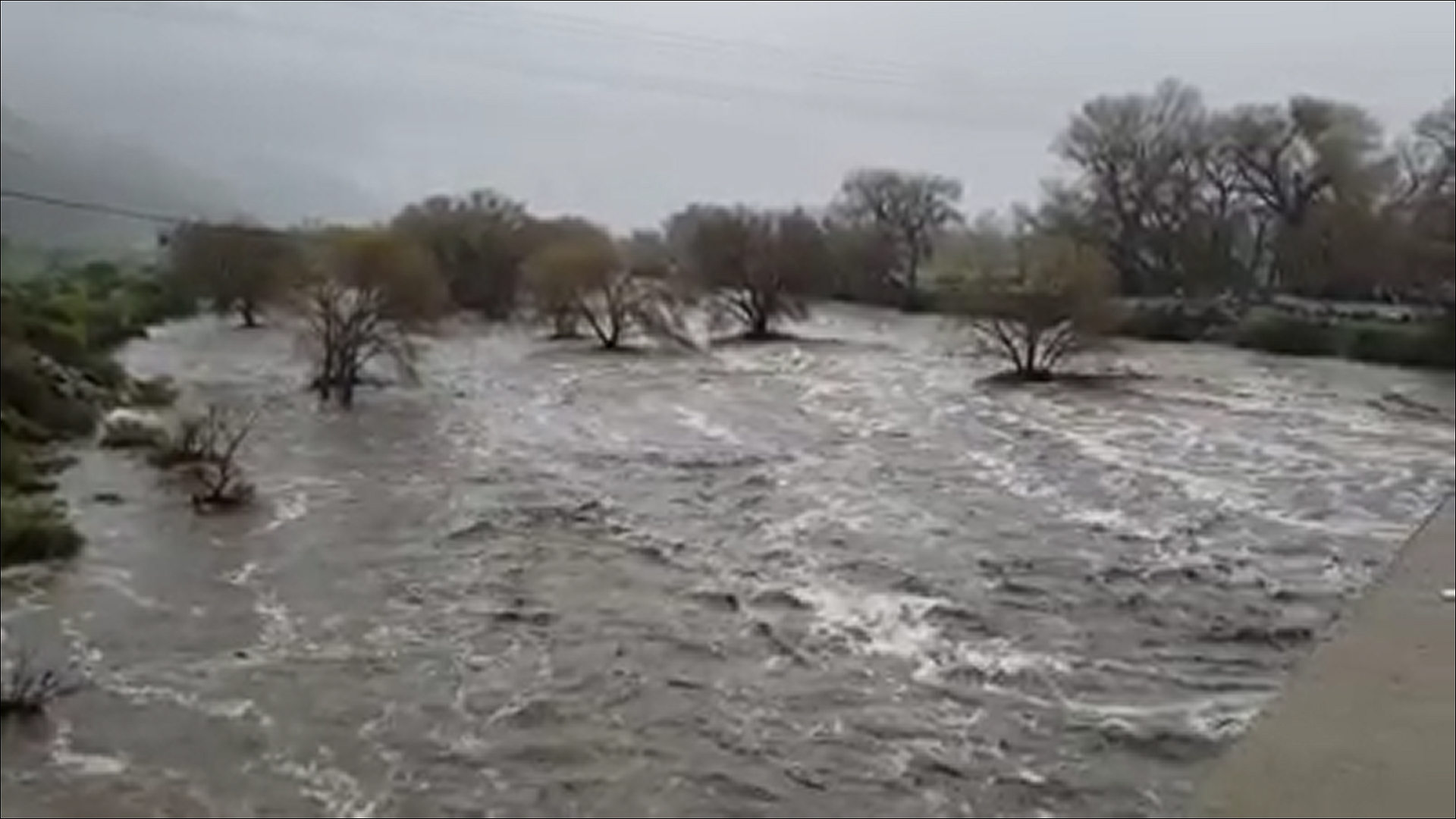
The San Jacinto River during the destructive February 13–14, 2019 storm event. San Jacinto recorded 3.66" of rainfall on February 14. Photo is taken from the State Street bridge crossing.

The river is formed at the west base of the San Jacinto Mountains by the confluence of its North and South forks. The South Fork flows from near Santa Rosa Summit, through Pine Meadow and Garner Valley to Lake Hemet, which holds 14,000 acre-feet (17,000,000 m^{3}) of water. Hemet Dam was built in 1895 to supply water to the city of Hemet. Downstream of the dam, the South Fork joins the North Fork east of the town of Valle Vista near Highway 74, and the main stem of the San Jacinto River continues northwest until it discharges into Mystic Lake, a couple of miles east of Lake Perris. Overflow from the river then flows southwest, passing under Ramona Expressway and Interstate 215, and through Railroad Canyon to Railroad Canyon Reservoir, also called Canyon Lake, which has a capacity of 11,900 acre-feet (14,700,000 m^{3}). Downstream of Railroad Canyon Dam, the river continues flowing roughly west southwest through the canyon through the Temescal Mountains for about 3 miles (4.8 km) until it drains into Lake Elsinore. The lake usually has no outflow other than evaporation, but in years of heavy rainfall it overflows into Temescal Creek, which flows northwest to the Santa Ana River in Corona, California.

== List of tributaries of the San Jacinto River ==
- Cottonwood Canyon Creek in Railroad Canyon
- Canyon Lake in Railroad Canyon
  - Salt Creek
- Perris Valley Channel
- Bautista Creek
- Indian Creek
  - Lake Fulmor
- North Fork San Jacinto River
  - Logan Creek
  - Stone Creek
  - Black Mountain Creek
  - Fuller Mill Creek
- South Fork San Jacinto River
  - Dry Creek
    - Strawberry Creek
    - Coldwater Creek
  - Spillway Canyon Creek
  - Lake Hemet
  - Herkey Creek
  - Fobes Canyon Creek
  - Pipe Creek
  - Martinez Creek
  - Gold Shot Creek
  - Penrod Canyon Creek
