= Pinacate Mining District =

Coordinates: 33.74°N 117.29°W

The Pinacate Mining District is 5 to 8 miles southwest of Perris, California. It included the Good Hope Mine, Steele's Mine, Santa Rosa (Rosalia) Mine, Virginia or Shay Mine, Santa Fe Mine and many other smaller works like the Little Maggie Mine. It produced a total of about 104,000 ounces of gold through 1959, all from the lodes of various mines. The district declined until the mid-1930s, when attempts were made to rehabilitate the Good Hope and several other mines. These efforts were largely unsuccessful, the Good Hope mine closed when it was flooded with underground water. Only three ounces of gold were produced in the district between 1943 and 1959.
