= Alberhill, California =

Unincorporated community in California, United States

Alberhill
- Unincorporated community
- Location in California Alberhill (the United States)
- Coordinates: 33°43′38″N 117°23′59″W
- Country: United States
- State: California
- County: Riverside County
- Elevation: 1,234 ft (376 m)

Alberhill (formerly, Alberhil) is an unincorporated community in the Inland Empire region of Riverside County, California. Alberhill is located 5.5 miles (8.9 km) northwest of Lake Elsinore. It lies at an elevation of 1234 feet (376 m). Alberhill was named after C.H. Albers and James and George Hill.

== History ==
=== Early history ===
Coal, along with clay deposits, was found in the area by John D. Huff in the late 1880s. C.H. Albers, James and George Hill organized the Alberhill Coal and Clay Company which mined the low-grade lignite coal and fire clay in the area from 1890 until 1940. Mining in underground shafts and tunnels, coal was dug with picks, shovels and wheelbarrows. The coal mine was in a canyon, 0.9 miles southeast of what became Alberhill, at the end of a spur line off of the California Southern Railroad tracks. The spur was built in 1896, from Lake Elsinore Junction through Lake Elsinore and Terra Cotta, to the mine where coal could be loaded into coal cars. Pacific Sewer Pipe Company had a plant at nearby Terra Cotta, (2.3 miles southeast of what became Alberhill) that produced sewer pipe using the Alberhill Company's clay to form the pipe and used their coal to fire the kilns for their production from 1890 until 1915. In 1915 the plant was closed and production was moved to Santa Fe Springs and the new publicly held company was renamed Pacific Clay Products.

=== Alberhill ===
In 1895, the Los Angeles Brick Company started business and soon became the town of Alberhill, making face brick, paving brick, sewer pipe, and roofing tile. In 1918 the company name became Los Angeles Pressed Brick Company. Many buildings in Los Angeles were built using its brick and tile, including Royce Hall and Powell Library, both built in the 1920s. Alberhill was a company town, with a Catholic church and a three-room elementary schoolhouse that remained open until the 1960s. Alberhill had its own post office, which operated from 1915 to 1969. The name commemorates C.H. Albers and James and George Hill, landowners and owners of the coal and clay mine. The Los Angeles Brick Company was purchased by Pacific Clay Products in 1963.

== Today ==
The brick production facility of Pacific Clay Products, Inc. and the Alberhill Schoolhouse at 33°43′32″N 117°23′38″W are all that remain of the original town among the tailings of the clay mines.
