= California Symphony =

Orchestra in Walnut Creek, California

- Orchestra
- Former name: New Contra Costa Symphony
- Founded: 1986
- Location: Walnut Creek, California, U.S.
- Concert hall: Lesher Center for the Arts
- Concertmaster: Jennifer Cho
- Music director: Donato Cabrera
- Website: www.californiasymphony.org

The California Symphony is a professional orchestra based at the Lesher Center for the Arts in Walnut Creek, California, in the East Bay region of the San Francisco Bay Area. It was founded in 1986 and is a member of the Association of California Symphony Orchestras. Since 2013, it has been led by Donato Cabrera.

== History ==
=== 1986–2013 ===
The California Symphony was founded in 1986 as the New Contra Costa Symphony by original board of directors members James Reiter and Len Sperry, with Carol Handelman as General Manager. The founding music director was Barry Jekowsky, the principal timpanist for the San Francisco Symphony and a Juilliard-trained conductor who had recently made his international debut as the guest conductor of the London Philharmonic Orchestra. The first performance of the New Contra Costa Symphony was held on May 17, 1987, at the Rheem Theatre in Moraga.

The orchestra was renamed the California Symphony in 1988 to indicate that the organization's operations were not limited to the Diablo Valley.

In 1997, the orchestra released its recording debut, the album Lou Harrison: A Portrait, conducted by Barry Jekowsky, and featuring the music of California composer Lou Harrison, with vocalist Al Jarreau as the soloist in Harrison's Symphony No. 4.

Executive Director Stacey Street was hired in 2001, replacing Millie Mitchell. By 2002, Street had negotiated a three-year contract with the musicians and grew an operating surplus of $37,500.

At the end of 2009, Executive Director Stacey Street left the California Symphony.

In October 2010, after 24 years with the California Symphony, Jekowsky left the orchestra and the search for a new music director began. Guest conductors led the orchestra in the meantime. Asher Raboy was the first of these. Guest conductors "garnered the symphony some of the best reviews and most enthusiastic audiences of its quarter-century history."

After the success of the 2011–2012 season, the symphony added three concerts to the next year's program to bring the grand total to seven. Over the course of the 2012–2013 season, the California Symphony auditioned seven conductors for the position of music director, each conductor leading the ensemble in one of the season's concerts. The search for conductors was led by Board President Thomas Overhoff. The search also included member Chuck Scanlan and Board Chair Richard Jarrett.

=== 2013–2019 ===
After multiple appearances as a guest conductor for the California Symphony and succeeding in the audition process, Donato Cabrera was appointed the position of Music Director in 2013. Member Chuck Scanlan said about the conductor, "He had ideas, plans, programs, [and] he was the most focused on the future." According to the California Symphony website, "Since Cabrera's appointment as Music Director of the California Symphony in 2013, the organization has reached new artistic heights by implementing innovative programming that emphasizes welcoming newcomers and loyalists alike, building on its reputation for championing music by living composers, and committing to programming music by women and people of color."

In October 2014, Aubrey Bergauer took the position of executive director. The orchestra, which had been contemplating closure before Bergauer came aboard, experienced a positive turn of fortunes during her tenure. She, along with partners Music Director Donato Cabrera and Symphony Board President Bill Armstrong, were credited with "saving the orchestra" from near-imminent financial collapse in 2014.

Bergauer restructured the California Symphony's marketing and development campaigns and revised the concert setting. In addition, she focused on engaging younger and more diverse audiences using data-driven research gained from the Symphony's "Orchestra X" audience research project.

By 2019, the California Symphony had doubled its audience, increased the number of donor households by 180%, more than doubled the number of performances offered per year, increased its budget by 50%, and secured the largest endowment gift in the orchestra's history, at $1 million.

In August 2016, the California Symphony launched an audience research project called "Orchestra X", in which volunteers attended two of the orchestra's concerts and then attended a discussion about the experience over pizza and beers during which they were encouraged to express what they felt worked and didn't work for them about the performances.

Executive Director Aubrey Bergauer detailed the process and the findings on her blog; results were posted in November 2016. The volunteers expressed concerns with website issues, seat selection, and questions such as "What do I wear?" and "When do I clap?" rather than with the music itself. Two years after the project ran, "Orchestra X: Chapter 2" was published on Bergauer's blog, listing the changes the California Symphony staff had made since the program's results were released.

Current concertmaster Jennifer Cho was appointed in August 2017.

Also in 2017, the California Symphony released a public statement of its commitment to diversity. The orchestra achieved greater than 20% programming by women and people of color in 2019.

=== 2019–present ===
Executive Director Aubrey Bergauer left the California Symphony on August 15, 2019. Bergauer stated, "Now is the right time to hand off the California Symphony in a position of strength." Symphony Board President Bill Armstrong stated, "We are grateful for the extraordinary growth we've experienced under her leadership."

The orchestra appointed as its new executive director, Lisa Dell, who took over in November 2019.

In fall 2020, with the Lesher Center shut down because of the COVID-19 pandemic, the orchestra broadcast a series of online concerts – Second Saturdays @ California Symphony – with featured soloists performing and in conversation with Music Director Donato Cabrera. In 2021, the orchestra created a digital series called Poetry in Motion, presenting orchestral music inspired by poetry. Like the Second Saturdays concerts, these performances were streamed on the orchestra's website and broadcast on Walnut Creek TV.

In 2023, Cabrera was appointed artistic director in addition to his music director role and his contract was extended for five more years.

== Young American Composer-in-Residence ==
California Symphony's Young American composer-in-residence program has been called "a model for residency programs across the country." The program began in 1991 and each composer is with the Symphony for three years. The first Young American composer-in-residence was Kamran Ince. SFGate reported that "[t]he idea for the program came out of [Barry] Jekowsky's long-standing advocacy of both young musicians and American composers." The program allows young American composers, selected through an application process, to workshop their music with the full orchestra. The ensemble then performs the world premiere of the new pieces composed, and on occasion the Symphony has commissioned works from previous participants after their terms have ended.

The first woman composer in the program's history, Katherine Balch, was selected for the 2017–2020 term. She commented that "smaller organizations like the California Symphony often lead the way."

=== List of Young American Composers-in-Residence ===
- Saad Haddad (2023–2026)
- Viet Cuong (2020–2023)
- Katherine Balch (2017–2020)
- Dan Visconti (2014–2017)
- D. J. Sparr (2011–2014)
- Mason Bates (2007–2010)
- Kevin Beavers (2002–2005)
- Pierre Jalbert (1999–2002)
- Kevin Puts (1996–1999)
- Christopher Theofanidis (1994–1996)
- Kamran Ince (1991–1992)

== Education ==
The Symphony runs a number of education programs.

=== Sound Minds ===
"Inspired by the El Sistema program of Venezuela, the California Symphony began Sound Minds as a pilot program at Downer Elementary in San Pablo in 2012. Now serving all second- through sixth-grade students at Downer Elementary who wish to participate, the program remains completely free of charge to students and families."

Sound Minds provides music instruction to elementary school pupils in addition to other academic work, three days a week. Downer Elementary is in a low-income neighborhood and, according to NPR, "serves mainly struggling Latino families, many of them immigrants from Mexico. More than 95 percent of its students receive free and reduced-price lunch." Downer's previous principal, Marco Gonzales, is especially encouraging of the program. He stated that it "gives kids a place to belong" and is "one of the most exciting things I've ever done in a school setting."

The Symphony tracks Sound Minds students throughout their experience in the program. After just one year in the program, students' academic scores tend to increase. In 2017, the California Symphony secured a collaboration with the East Bay Center for Performing Arts, allowing Sound Minds graduates to pursue the competitive Young Artist Diploma Program.

=== Fresh Look ===
Beginning in 2018, the Symphony has run a summer adult education program called Fresh Look: The Symphony Exposed. The program is led by instructor Scott Foglesong.

=== Education concerts ===
The Symphony announced a new education concert series to begin in the fall of 2024, to include music by former Young Composer in Residence Mason Bates.

== Recordings and radio broadcasts ==
=== Recordings ===
- Lou Harrison: A Portrait (1997)

=== Radio broadcasts ===
The Symphony joined with Classical KUSC and KDFC Radio to present a new series of radio broadcasts featuring classical music as well as commissions from composers who have been part of the orchestra's Young Composer in Residency program.

In 2022, the Symphony broadcast a regular Monday evening series of concerts on WFMT. The series resumed, to be heard on 68 stations covering 338 U.S. markets, in 2024.
