= Troy Lee Designs =

American sports equipment manufacturer

Troy Lee Designs, Inc.
- Type: Private
- Industry: Sporting goods
- Founded: 1981; 45 years ago
- Founder: Troy Lee
- Headquarters: Corona, California, US
- Area served: 15 countries
- Products: Motocross gear; Mountain biking gear; BMX gear; Personal protective equipment
- Website: troyleedesigns.com

Troy Lee Designs (TLD) is an American action sports apparel and custom paint company founded in 1981 and headquartered in Corona, California. Troy Lee Designs is a privately held company run by the eponymous founder Troy Lee and co-owned by investment partners Fasthouse.

Troy Lee's products include dirtbike and mountain biking equipment (helmets, jerseys, gloves, pants),

== History ==
Troy Lee was the son of an artist and motorcycle racer named Larry Lee, and grandson of Bonneville Speed Trials co-founder Marvin Lee. Troy was an aspiring professional motocross racer in Southern California in the early 1980s who had started painting the motocross helmets of several of his pro racing friends, eventually giving up the pursuit of racing fame to devote his full time and efforts to painting helmets. Besides custom paint, his early product offerings were limited to custom-made visors for motocross helmets, which he vacuum-formed in the oven in his mother’s house in Corona, California. Due to the constant smell of burnt plastic permeating the house, Troy’s mother Linda forced him to move the business out of her house, which he eventually relocated to a hangar at the Corona Municipal Airport.

The terms of the airport lease were such that Troy was required to dedicate 40% of his business to aviation related services, so he began painting registration numbers on private aircraft. The business remained at that location and Troy started to develop a line of mountain bike helmets in cooperation with Japanese helmet maker Shoei until 1991, when operations were moved to a newly constructed building in a business park complex less than a mile away. The product line had grown to mountain bike apparel and helmets, helmet visors, stickers as well as sportswear. By 1998 TLD started to develop a line of motocross apparel, which by 2004 had grown to a full line of motocross and mountain bike apparel, helmets and protective gear.

== Race team ==
In 2001, Troy Lee formed a supermoto race team featuring himself and supercross and motocross racing's Jeremy McGrath and Jeff Ward to contest the newly formed AMA Supermoto national championship series with equipment support from Honda and title sponsors Red Bull.

In 2003, Troy moved the business into the unique and historic former Ganahl Lumber building, a 22,600 square feet (2,100 m^{2}) facility that includes a 4,000 sq ft (370 m^{2}) showroom and museum that showcases Troy’s collection of unique sports memorabilia. The race team continued to grow in size with the addition of Doug Henry, Chris Fillmore and Cassidy Anderson. The team won multiple AMA Supermoto titles between 2004–2006 in both the 250cc and 450cc classes with Ward and Anderson.

== Retail and distribution ==
Troy Lee Designs products are sold worldwide by a network of distributors in 15 different countries that include the United Kingdom, France, Spain, Italy, Germany, Benelux, Switzerland, Australia, New Zealand, Japan, Philippines, Argentina, Peru and Canada. Notable retailers in the US include REI, BTO Sports, Adidas, Fasthouse, and Backcountry Sports.
