= Garages of the Valley =

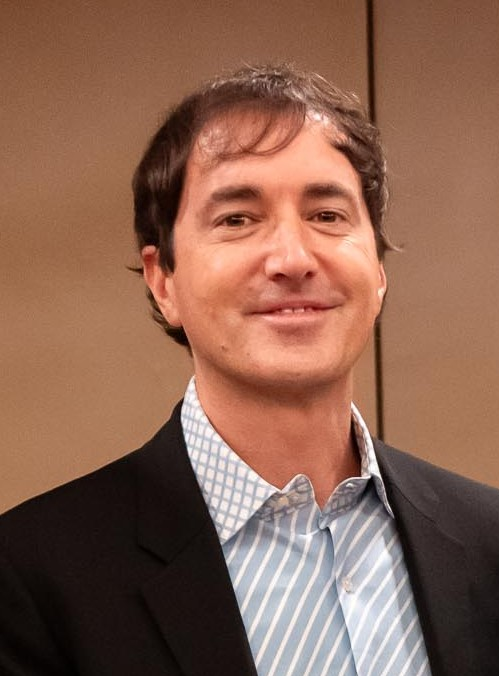
Mason Bates

Garages of the Valley is a single-movement orchestral composition by the American composer Mason Bates. The work was jointly commissioned by the Saint Paul Chamber Orchestra and the Milwaukee Symphony Orchestra. The world premiere was performed on March 6, 2014, in Stillwater, Minnesota by the Saint Paul Chamber Orchestra under conductor Scott Yoo. The European premiere was performed on June 30, 2015, in Ingolstadt, Germany during the opening concert of the 2015 Audi Sommerkonzerte Festival by the San Francisco Symphony Youth Orchestra under conductor Donato Cabrera. The piece is dedicated to Dutch conductor Edo de Waart.

== Composition ==
Garages of the Valley is composed in a single movement and has a duration of roughly 10 minutes. It was inspired by the garages in Silicon Valley that "housed the visionaries behind Apple, Hewlett Packard, Intel, and Google." Bates wrote in the score program notes:

The imagined music of these tech workshops begins hyper-kinetically yet sporadically, filled with false starts. It soon flashes into a quicksilver world of out exotic textures and tunings that is informed by the music of Frenchman Gérard Grisey (whose imaginative orchestrations sound electronic but are completely unplugged). The exhilarating finale reflects the infectious optimism of the great inventors of our time, who conjured new worlds within the bright Valley's dark garages.

=== Instrumentation ===
The work is scored for an orchestra comprising three flutes (2nd doubling alto flute, all doubling piccolo), two oboes (2nd doubling English horn), two clarinets (2nd doubling E♭ clarinet and bass clarinet), two bassoons, two French horns, two trumpets, one or two percussionists (on marimba, wood block, sandpaper blocks, djembe, suspended cymbal, bongo drums, glockenspiel, triangle, xylophone, bass drum), and strings.

== Reception ==
Reviewing the world premiere, Rob Hubbard of the St. Paul Pioneer Press wrote:

It's a very engaging piece with a programmatic pulse, beginning with an opening theme that stutters, stops and restarts a few times, just like a faltering machine making its maiden voyage (a Silicon Valley startup of a different sort). But get going it does, the strings sometimes voicing the kind of melancholy layers found in Samuel Barber's harmonies. The work eventually becomes a driving foxtrot reminiscent of John Adams (another Bay Area product).

Hubbard added, "The work demonstrated Bates to be a composer with a vivid imagination. You're likely to be hearing a lot from him in coming years." Elaine Schmidt of the Milwaukee Journal Sentinel called the piece "effervescent" and lauded, "the piece began with short bursts of melodic and harmonic activity that eventually coalesced in an engaging work that's somehow full of positive energy."
