= Corona Symphony Orchestra =

Orchestra in Corona, California

- Orchestra
- Short name: CSO
- Founded: 2008, by Don Kindred
- Location: Corona, California, U.S.
- Music director: Marco A. Mejia
- Website: coronasymphonyorchestra.org

The Corona Symphony Orchestra (CSO) is a 501(c)(3) non-profit orchestra based in Corona, California.

The CSO was formed in 2008 by executive board member Don Kindred and is currently directed by Marco A. Mejia, a founding member. The CSO performs at civic events and participates in music education through the Corona Symphony Conservatory.

The CSO is a member of the Association of California Symphony Orchestras (ACSO) and Arts Alive.
