= L66 =

L66 may refer to:

- GM L66 engine, an OEM V6 engine
- HMS Quorn (L66), a Hunt-class destroyer
- L66 (airport), an American public airport
- L66A1, British Army designation of the Walther PP
