= Saad Haddad (composer) =

American composer

Saad Haddad (born September 1, 1992) is an American composer of contemporary classical music, and a professor of composition at Columbia University in New York City, and is professor of composition at New Jersey City University. He serves as composer-in-residence with the California Symphony. The New York Times has described his work as "a remarkable fusion of idioms, using Western instruments to create a convincing equivalent of a Middle Eastern ensemble."

== Early life and career ==
Saad Haddad was born in 1992 in Augusta, Georgia, but moved to Los Angeles shortly after. After an early interest in composition, Haddad joined the inaugural Nancy and Barry Sanders Composer Fellowship Program with the Los Angeles Philharmonic as a high school student, under the teaching of composer Steven Stucky. Haddad studied at the University of Southern California and the Juilliard School, where he studied under John Corigliano, Mari Kimura, Brian Shephard, Bruce Broughton, Frank Ticheli, Stephen Hartke, and Donald Crockett. He received his doctorate in 2023 from Columbia University, where he studied with Georg Friedrich Haas, and George E. Lewis, and electronic music with Brad Garton.

Haddad first came to recognition in 2015, when he wrote Kaman Fantasy for the Columbus Symphony and Milwaukee Symphony. That year, Manarah for the American Composers Orchestra was also premiered.

He has written 2 concertos; one for IRCAM and the Orchestre national d’Île-de-France, and one for clarinetist Kinan Azmeh and the Princeton Symphony. His work Aysheen was commissioned by the Los Angeles Philharmonic, and is a microtonal poem about life, which simulates breathing and heartbeat.

Other ensembles that have performed his work include the Minnesota Orchestra, JACK Quartet, International Contemporary Ensemble, California Symphony, and Imani Winds.

In 2017, he was awarded the Charles Ives Fellowship from the American Academy of Arts and Letters.
