= Asher Raboy =

American composer

Asher Raboy (born January 14, 1957) is an American composer, conductor and educator living in Napa, California. He is the Resident Artist in the Department of Music for Pacific Union College. He was music director of the Napa Valley Symphony for twenty years, conductor of the Diablo Ballet for four and has been music director, assistant or guest conductor for a number of other ensembles. He has worked in opera, theater, symphony (classical and pops) and ballet.

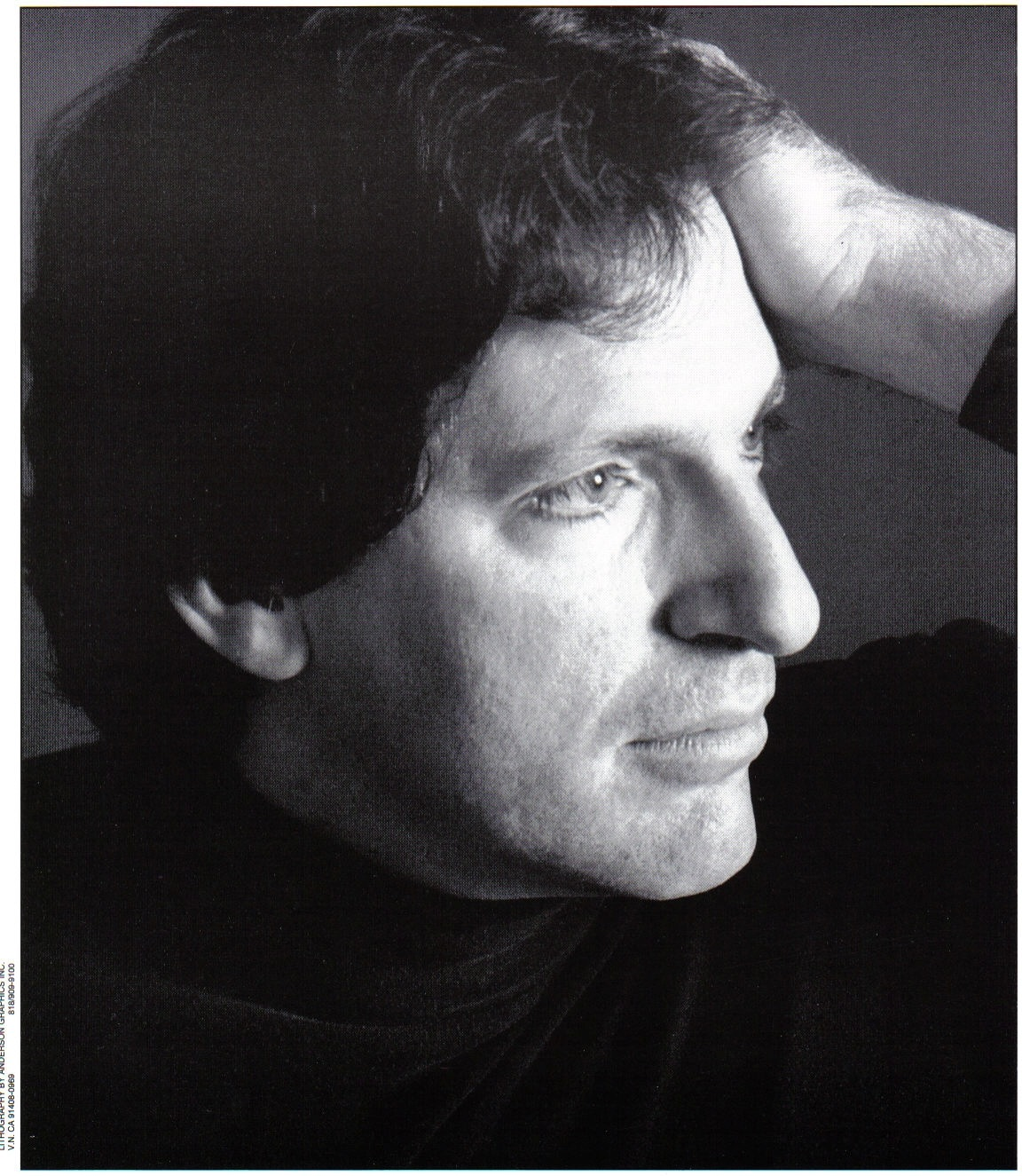
A picture of the composer from 2004, taken by his late wife Lisa Bowen Raboy

== Early life and education ==
Asher Samuel Raboy was born in Park Forest, Illinois (a suburb on the south side of Chicago). His father is of Russian-Jewish descent, and his mother is descended from New England Puritans. Both were physicists. Asher was the middle of seven children.

Raboy began studying the piano at the age of five. He later developed an interest in orchestral scores, and conducted a number of bands and orchestras throughout his childhood.

Raboy began composing in junior high school, and created pieces for each of his siblings for their piano recital.

Asher attended the State University of New York at Binghamton (now Binghamton University) where he received a Bachelor of Arts degree in 1978. He studied composition with Ezra Laderman, and, during that time, apprenticed as a conductor and vocal coach with Peyton Hibbitt at the Tri-Cities Opera Company. He went off to Carnegie-Mellon University for his Masters of Fine Arts (1981), studying conducting with Robert Page and Istvan Jaray, and composition with Leonardo Balada.

== Career ==
Raboy returned to Binghamton University to study physics and mathematics while continuing his search for employment. John Covelli appointed him Conducting Assistant of the Binghamton Symphony (now called the Binghamton Philharmonic). He moved on to work as Assistant Conductor with the Hudson Valley Philharmonic under Imre Pallo, and then was appointed Music Director of the Napa Valley Symphony

In 2008 Raboy became a college professor. He wrote a number of scripts and arrangements specifically for young people, and performed concerts for students in pre-school and grade school.

=== Conducting ===
While with the Hudson Valley Philharmonic in Upstate New York, he conducted classical concerts for the Albany Symphony Orchestra, performed on a barge on the Hudson River to celebrate the birthday of Troy, and toured the capital area performing for children. During this time, he worked briefly with the Empire State Youth Orchestra, and then became the co-founder and co-music director for the New Paltz Youth Symphony (now called College-Youth Symphony of SUNY New Paltz).

Raboy became conductor of the Napa Valley Symphony Orchestra in 1990, and remained so for twenty years until 2012. He conducted the Diablo Ballet for four years, was the Assistant Conductor with the Santa Rosa Symphony, founded the Napa Valley Youth Orchestra, and guest conducted theater, ballet and symphony productions. He also worked for the Columbus Symphony, Las Vegas Philharmonic Orchestra, Nevada Festival Ballet, California Symphony, Springfield (Missouri) Symphony Orchestra, Reno Philharmonic Orchestra, Belleayre Music Festival Orchestra, Rohnert Park Chamber Orchestra and the Tuscaloosa Symphony Orchestra.

== Composing ==
Raboy has composed or arranged nearly sixty works. been an energetic composer. His orchestral works have been performed by the Napa Valley Symphony. His early works include his Piano Sonata and his first orchestral composition, Gymnopedies, or the Presence of the Goddess. In the mid 1980s, as his conducting began to demand more of his time, Raboy spent less time composing, switching to smaller forms. Then, in 1992, he returned to orchestral work, and created a number of pieces, including Piano Concerto, Orchestral Dances, The Coming Storm, The Journey, and A Mystic Valley.

Raboy has composed violin pieces to be performed by his wife, violinist Katy Brownell. He recently completed My Love by the Ocean (A Love Song for Katy), and is currently working on a new sonata for two violins.

== Works ==
=== Orchestral works ===
==== Original work without soloists ====
- The Seduction of Enkidu
- The Journey
- The Coming Storm
- For the Start of a New Life (A Fanfare)
- A Mystic Valley
- Orchestral Dances
- The New Age
- Phoenix
- King Lear (Tone Poem)
- Of A Distant Love
- Gymnopedies or The Presence of the Goddess (A Suite for Small Orchestra)

==== Original work with soloists ====
- Love Song for Marguerite
- Piano Concerto
- Three Small Musicians
- Clarinet Concerto

==== Orchestral arrangements without soloists ====
- De Colores
- Yankee Doodle
- Shalom Chaverim / Dona nobis pacem

==== Orchestral arrangements with vocal solos (with and without chorus) ====
- The Lord is my Light (Frances Allitsen)
- Alleluia (Ferdinand Hummel)
- I Got A Letter (Traditional)
- Never Mind Bo Peep, We Will Find Your Sheep from Babes in Toyland
- I Want What I Want from Mlle. Modiste
- Sadie Salome Go Home (Edgar Leslie and Irving Berlin)

==== Orchestra arrangement with chorus (but no soloists) ====
- Centenary Hymns (Abide With Us and In the Beauty of Holiness)
- There Shall a Star Come Out of Jacob (Mendelssohn)

=== Wind ensemble and band works ===
==== Original works ====
- Dances for Winds
- Fanfare for the Pony Express
- For the Start of a New Life (A Fanfare)
- Phoenix
- Lyman Park
- Maine Community Band March (with Nathan Raboy)

==== Arrangements for wind ensemble and band ====
- Centenary Hymns (Abide With Us and In the Beauty of Holiness)

=== Chamber music ===
==== Original work ====
- My Love by the Ocean (A Love Song for Katy)
- Gypsy Ballads
- A Love Song for Marguerite
- Sonata for Mallet Percussion
- Essay for Amplified Cello
- Duo for 2 Trombones and 2 Trumpets
- Four Processional Dances for Solo Flute
- Trio for Violin, Cello and Piano
- Piano Sonata

==== Arrangements for chamber ensemble ====
- Wachet Auf (Sleepers Awake)
- Pavane (Fauré)
- Meditation from Thaïs
- Liebestraum (Liszt)

=== Solo vocal work ===
==== Original work ====
- If Ever Two Were One (Poem by Anne Bradstreet)

=== Choral work ===
==== Original work ====
- It’s Cold in Santa Barbara (a Christmas carol)
- If Ever Two Were One (Poem by Anne Bradstreet)
- Lord, I need you (church anthem)

==== Arrangements for chorus ====
- Shalom Chaverim/Dona Nobis Pacem

=== Stage works ===
- The Ill-Fated Princess (An opera for an audience of young people)
