= Katherine Balch =

American composer (born 1991)

- Born: 1991 (age 34–35); San Diego, California, U.S.
- Education: Tufts University; New England Conservatory of Music; Yale School of Music; Columbia University
- Occupation: Composer
- Employer: Peabody Institute; Yale School of Music
- Awards: Guggenheim Fellowship (2025); Royal Philharmonic Society Music Award in Large-Scale Composition (2025)

Academic background
- Thesis: Liminal Spaces: Sonic Ecologies within and around the Music of Erin Gee (2022)
- Doctoral advisor: George E. Lewis
- Musical career
- Genre: Contemporary classical music
- Website: katherinebalch.com

Katherine Elise Balch (born 1991) is an American composer. She is a 2025 Guggenheim Fellow and winner of a 2025 Royal Philharmonic Society Music Award.

== Early life ==
Balch was born and raised in San Diego. She obtained her bachelor's degree from Tufts University and the New England Conservatory of Music and her master's degree from Yale School of Music. In 2022, she obtained her doctorate of musical arts from Columbia University; her doctoral dissertation Liminal Spaces: Sonic Ecologies within and around the Music of Erin Gee was supervised by George E. Lewis.

== Musical career ==
She was the 2014-2015 Collage New Music Fellow, and she won an ASCAP Morton Gould Young Composer Award. She was the California Symphony Young American Composer-in-Residence from 2017 to 2020 (the first woman to hold the position), as well as Young Concert Artists' William B. Butz Composition Chair from 2017 to 2019.

By 2017, Balch had worked as a composer with classical music ensembles including the Albany Symphony Orchestra, the FLUX Quartet, and the International Contemporary Ensemble. In May 2019, she debuted her concerto Artifacts at the Lesher Center for the Arts in Walnut Creek, California; San Francisco Chronicle music critic Joshua Kosman said of the concerto that "she's like some kind of musical Thomas Edison—you can just hear her tinkering around in her workshop, putting together new sounds and textural ideas".

Balch won the American Academy in Rome's 2020 Elliott Carter Rome Prize. She composed "Apartment Sounds" for Yvonne Lam's 2023 album Watch Over Us; American Record Guide called Balch "welcome purveyor of timbral variety in Apartment Sounds, as the recorded materials included in this short piece are relatively refreshing.

Her piece Forgetting was performed at the Song Company's March 2024 Superbloom production at the Sydney Opera House; Peter McCallum of WAtoday said it "began with stopped utterances and sounds in a state of almost silent inarticulateness and hesitancy". Manfred Honeck conducted her piece musica pyralis at the New York Philharmonic in April 2024; a New York Times review called the piece "a study in shifting atmospheres, wispy, mysterious and fleeting". Balch's commissioned piece for the Manchester Collective involved the use of text from Virginia Woolf's essay A Room of One's Own, and a review in The Guardian stated that Balch "found a connection between Rothko and Feldman and her own music in Virginia Woolf".

In 2025, Balch won the Royal Philharmonic Society Music Award in Large-Scale Composition for her work whisper concerto. The same year, she was awarded a Guggenheim Fellowship in Music Composition.

Balch worked as an adjunct professor at Jacobs School of Music at Indiana University during the 2021-2022 academic year. In 2022, she taught composition as part of the faculty of the Peabody Institute at Johns Hopkins University. She later returned to Yale School of Music as assistant professor of composition. She worked previously at Mannes School of Music and The Walden School.

== Personal life ==
Balch lives in Bethany, Connecticut.
