= Corona, California =

City in California, United States

- City
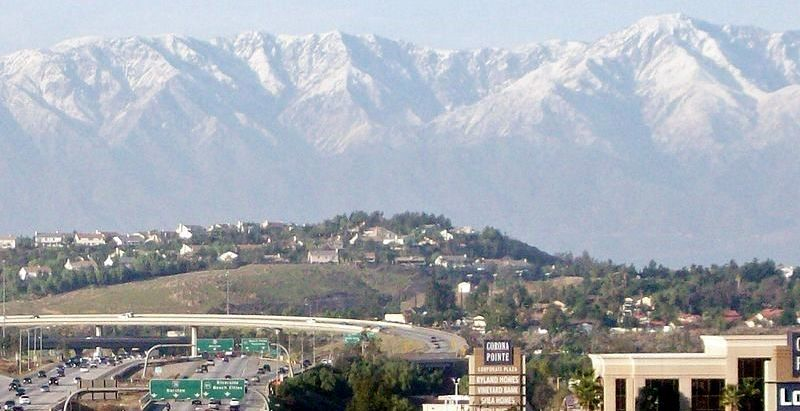
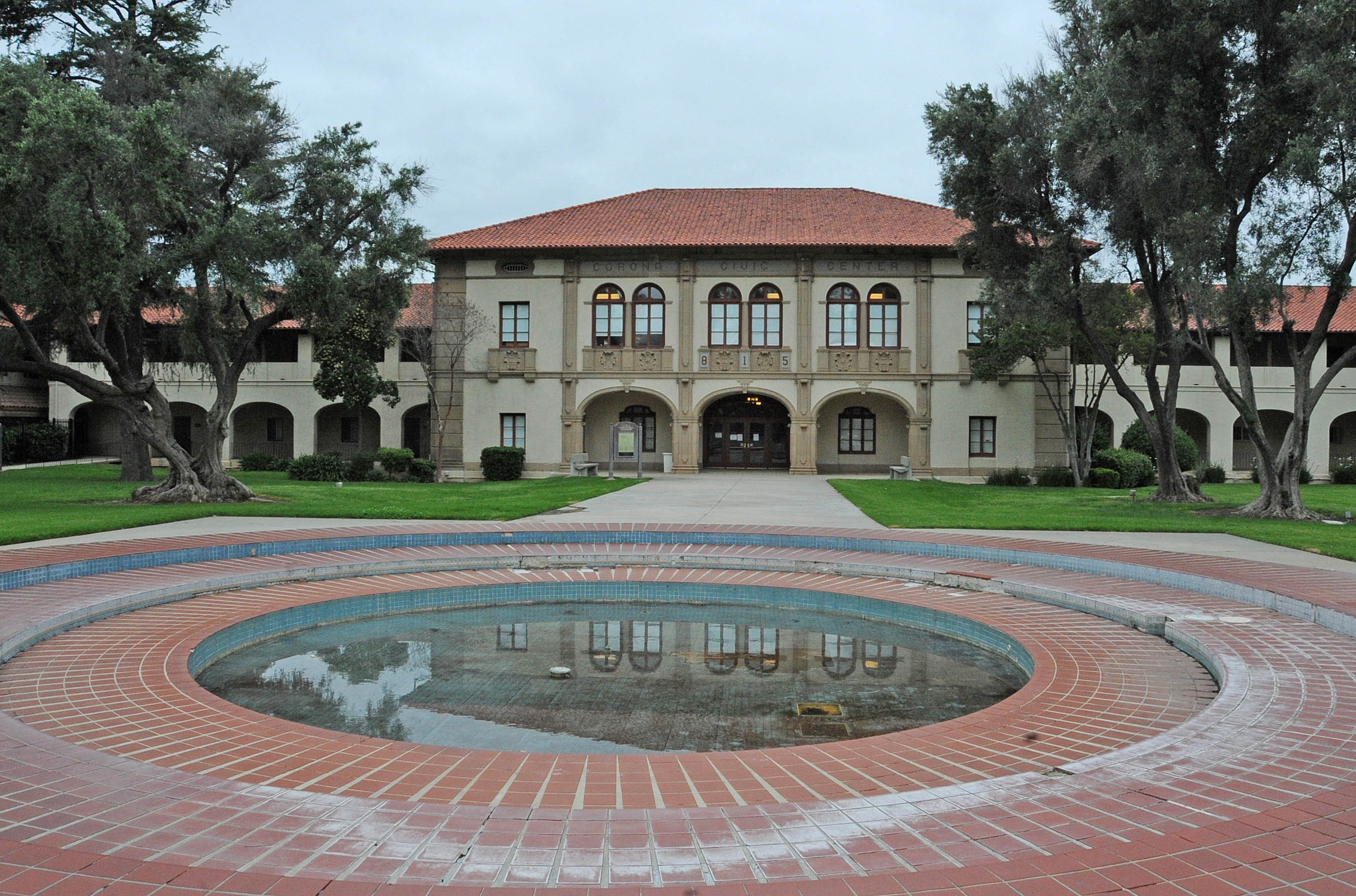
- Top: view of Corona, interchange of Interstate 15 and the 91 Freeway can be seen in the distance; bottom: Corona Historic Civic Center Theater

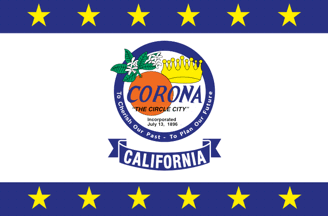
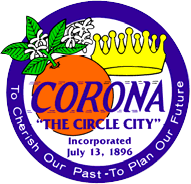
- Flag Seal
- Nicknames: Crown Town, The Circle City, Crown Colony, Queen Colony, Indianapolis of the West
- Motto: "To Cherish Our Past, To Plan Our Future"
- Interactive map of Corona, California
- Location within Greater Los Angeles Location within California Location in the United States
- Coordinates: 33°52′N 117°34′W
- Country: United States
- State: California
- County: Riverside
- Established: July 13, 1896

Government
  - Type: Council–manager
  - Mayor: Jacque Casillas
  - Vice Mayor: Wes Speake
  - City Council: Tom Richins; Tony Daddario; Jim Steiner
  - City Treasurer: Chad Willardson

Area
  - City: 39.96 sq mi (103.50 km^{2})
  - Land: 39.94 sq mi (103.45 km^{2})
  - Water: 0.019 sq mi (0.05 km^{2}) 0.27%
- Elevation: 679 ft (207 m)

Population (2020)
  - City: 157,136
  - Rank: 3rd in Riverside County; 34th in California; 161st in the United States
  - Density: 3,934.2/sq mi (1,519.02/km^{2})
  - Metro: 4,224,851
- Time zone: UTC−8 (Pacific)
  - Summer (DST): UTC−7 (PDT)
- ZIP codes: 92877–92883
- Area code: 951, 909
- FIPS code: 06-16350
- GNIS feature IDs: 1652691, 2410232
- Website: City Government; Tourism site

Corona (Spanish for "Crown") is a city in northwestern Riverside County, California, United States, directly bordering Orange and San Bernardino counties. Its current mayor is Jacque Casillas. At the 2020 census, the city had a population of 157,136, up from 152,374 at the 2010 census. Corona is surrounded by Riverside to the east, Norco to the north and northeast, Yorba Linda to the northwest, Cleveland National Forest and the Santa Ana Mountains to the west, southwest, and south. Several unincorporated communities are along the rest of the city's borders. Downtown Corona is approximately 48 miles (77 km) southeast of Downtown Los Angeles and 95 miles (153 km) north-northwest of San Diego.

Corona, located along the western edge of Southern California's Inland Empire region, is known as the "Circle City" due to Grand Boulevard's 3 mi (4.8 km) circular layout. It is one of the most residential cities in the Inland Empire, but also has a large industrial portion on the northern half, being the headquarters of companies such as Fender Musical Instruments Corporation, Monster Beverage Corporation, and sports car manufacturer Saleen.

== Etymology ==
Corona is Spanish for crown or wreath. Originally called South Riverside, citizens wanted to distinguish their city from the larger city of Riverside to the north. When it came time to incorporate the city a number of different names were considered, but the name Corona was chosen to play upon a unique feature of the city, the one-mile diameter drive that circled the center of the town.

== History ==
=== Indigenous ===
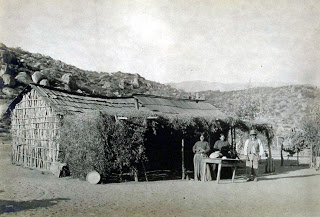
The Tongva and Payómkawichum (pictured in 1910) long inhabited the area that is now Corona.

Prior to the late eighteenth century, the area was primarily inhabited by the Tongva and Payómkawichum, who lived in a series of villages throughout the area. What is now Corona stood at the southeastern extent of Tovaangar, or the Tongva world, and at the northern edge of Payómkawichum territory.

The primary settlement in the area was the village of Paxauxa, which was established along the banks of the Temescal Creek at about where Corona is situated today. The settlement was shared by both the Tongva and Payómkawichum people. Cooperation and marriage between the two villages was common. High above the city of Corona, the village of Pamajam was also located in a small valley of the Santa Ana Mountains.

=== Colonial period ===
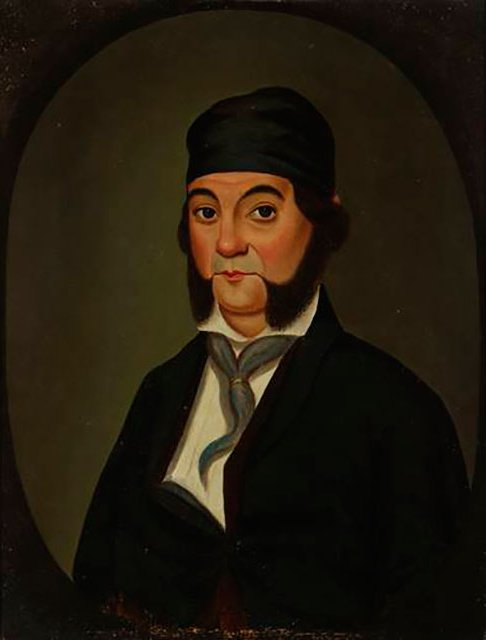
Don Bernardo Yorba, a wealthy Californio ranchero, was granted Rancho La Sierra, which included all of modern-day Corona.

The founding of Mission San Juan Capistrano in 1776 and Mission San Luis Rey in 1798 saw the introduction of Spanish soldiers and missionaries in the area. This resulted in villagers being brought to the mission to be baptized and as labor.

Spanish influence increased in the area with the establishment of the San Antonio de Pala Asistencia in 1816. Two years following the construction of this mission outpost, the Temescal Valley's first European resident, Leandro Serrano, was given permission by the Spanish to use the area for cattle grazing. His first order was to kill the local bear and mountain lion population for the imported herds.

After the secularization of the Spanish missions by the First Mexican Republic in 1833, the land under influence by the missions in Alta California was gradually granted to large landowners as ranches. In 1848, Californio governor Pio Pico issued this land to Bernardo Yorba, which included present-day city of Corona.

=== Establishment ===
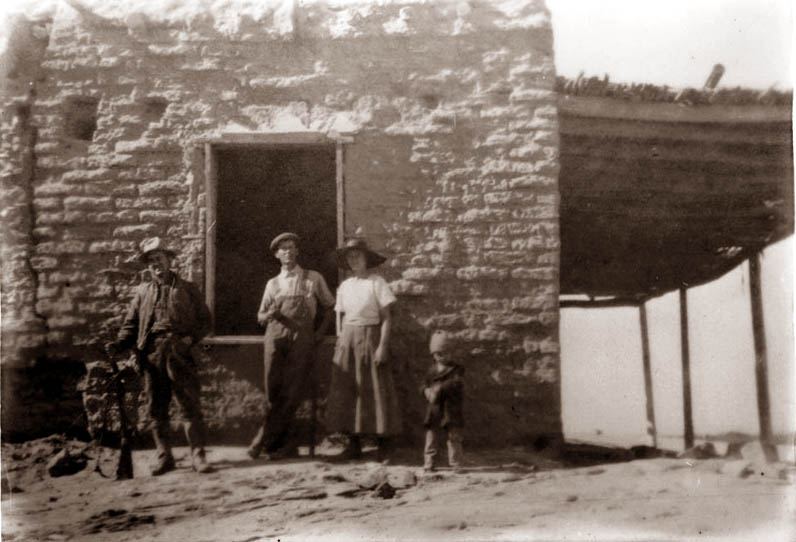
Temescal Butterfield stage station Corona in 1860

Corona was founded at the height of the Southern California citrus boom in 1886, and is situated at the upper end of the Santa Ana River Canyon, a significant pass through the Santa Ana Mountains. The town of Corona was once the "Lemon Capital of the World". A museum there presents the lemon's former role in the local economy. The city's name means crown in Spanish due to the circular shape of a crown and the circular shape of Grand Blvd. The nickname of Corona is "The Circle City" from the unique layout of its streets, with a standard grid enclosed by the circular Grand Boulevard, 2.75 miles (4.43 km) in circumference. The street layout was designed by Hiram Clay Kellogg, a civil engineer from Anaheim who was an influential figure in the early development of Orange County.

Corona was established as a town by the South Riverside Land and Water Company. The company was incorporated in 1886; founding members included ex-Governor of Iowa Samuel Merrill, R.B. Taylor, George L. Joy, A.S. Garretson, and Adolph Rimpau. Originally a citrus growers' organization, it purchased the lands of Rancho La Sierra of Bernardo Yorba, and the Rancho Temescal grant and the colony of South Riverside was laid out. They also secured the water rights to Temescal Creek, its tributaries and Lee Lake. Dams and pipelines were built to carry the water to the colony. In 1889, the Temescal Water Company was incorporated, to supply water for the new colony. This company purchased all the water-bearing lands in the Temescal valley and began drilling artesian wells.

Originally located in San Bernardino County, the city was named "South Riverside" and received its post office in that name on either May 27 or August 11, 1887 with Charles H. Cornell as the town's first postmaster. In 1893, South Riverside became part of the new Riverside County. In 1896, the city was renamed "Corona" for its circular Grand Boulevard, where three international automobile races were held in 1913, 1914 and 1916.

=== 20th century ===
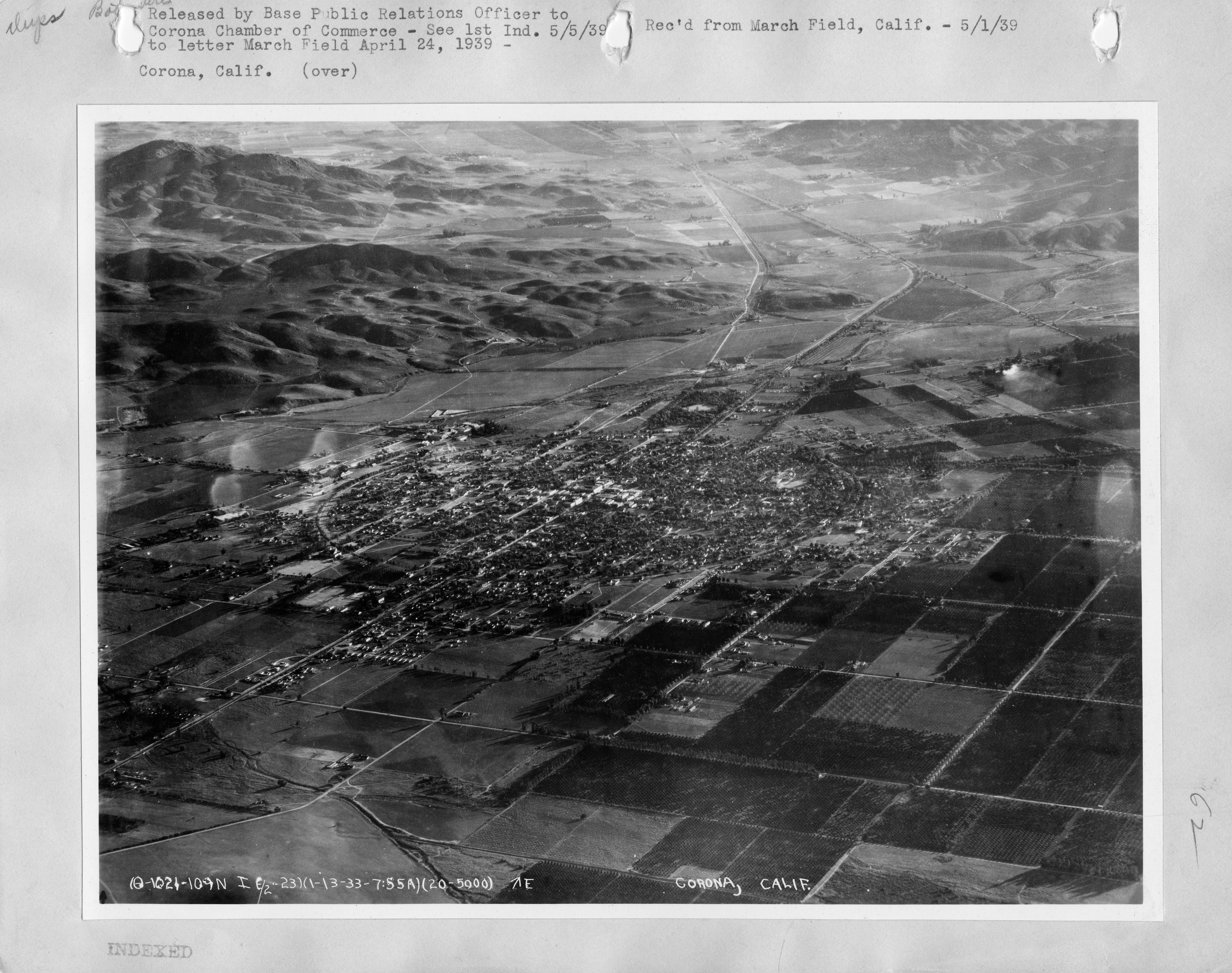
Aerial view of Corona in the 1940s.

The city of Corona has been popular among celebrities drawn to its upscale areas and relative privacy compared to Los Angeles. Lucille Ball and Desi Arnaz spent time at their ranch, located in north Corona (in what is now considered Eastvale), and played golf often at the Cresta Verde Golf Course in the northeastern section of the city. After their divorce, Arnaz continued to live in Corona.

In recent years Corona has been known as the "Gateway to the Inland Empire". In April 1980 David Felix became Corona's first Hispanic Mayor. Main Street Realtors wrote, "Prior to the 1980s, the city was largely an agricultural community, dominated by citrus orchards, ranches, and dairy farms. High real estate prices in Los Angeles and Orange counties made the area's land desirable to developers and industrialists, and by the late 1990s Corona was considered a major suburb of Los Angeles."

=== 21st century ===
In 2002, the city government considered an initiative to secede from Riverside County and form an autonomous Corona County because the city government and some residents were dissatisfied with how services were handled in nearby areas. The effort was also considered by areas in other cities in the western part of the county as far south as Murrieta. Whether nearby cities such as Norco would have been included in the new county are unknown. The proposed county would have been bordered by San Bernardino County to the northwest and by Orange County to the west, but it never came to fruition.

== Geography and climate ==
Corona is located in western Riverside County, east of Orange County.

According to the United States Census Bureau, the city has a total area of 38.9 square miles (101 km^{2}), of which 38.8 square miles (100 km^{2}) of it is land and 0.1 square miles (0.26 km^{2}) of it, or 0.27%, is water.

Corona experiences a hot Mediterranean climate (Köppen climate classification: CSa) and has mild to cool winters and hot summers. Most of the rainfall (as in all of Southern California) occurs during winter and early spring.

Winter days are pleasant, with the average highs staying in the mid to upper 60s. But compared to other areas in Southern California, winter lows are colder, with common frost and chilly mornings. Snowfall within city limits is rare. Snow flurries will occasionally fall, usually once every other year, but it very rarely snows to the point where it accumulates. The nearby Santa Ana Mountains receive a dusting of snow a few times each winter.

Spring brings pleasant weather with daytime temperatures in the mid to upper 70s, and nighttime lows in the upper 40s. Spring showers are common during the beginning of the season but are a rarity by late May.

Summertime is hot, with highs averaging in the low to mid 90s. During the hottest months, daytime temperatures in Corona can exceed 100 °F (38 °C). In early summer, Corona receives common overcast weather known as "May Gray" and "June Gloom". Summer thunderstorms are sporadic and usually happen between July and September from the North American Monsoons, bringing increased humidity and scattered thunderstorms.

Autumn features warm days and sharply cooler evenings, but can be windy due to the Santa Ana winds, blowing in two or three times a year from October to December.

Climate data for Corona, California
Month	Jan	Feb	Mar	Apr	May	Jun	Jul	Aug	Sep	Oct	Nov	Dec	Year
Record high °F (°C)	91 (33)	93 (34)	100 (38)	100 (38)	107 (42)	110 (43)	118 (48)	113 (45)	114 (46)	108 (42)	99 (37)	94 (34)	118 (48)
Mean daily maximum °F (°C)	66 (19)	69 (21)	71 (22)	77 (25)	80 (27)	87 (31)	92 (33)	93 (34)	90 (32)	83 (28)	74 (23)	67 (19)	79 (26)
Mean daily minimum °F (°C)	40 (4)	43 (6)	45 (7)	48 (9)	52 (11)	57 (14)	62 (17)	64 (18)	60 (16)	52 (11)	45 (7)	42 (6)	51 (11)
Record low °F (°C)	19 (−7)	25 (−4)	25 (−4)	28 (−2)	28 (−2)	39 (4)	41 (5)	41 (5)	41 (5)	29 (−2)	26 (−3)	22 (−6)	19 (−7)
Average precipitation inches (mm)	3.01 (76)	3.06 (78)	2.32 (59)	1.02 (26)	.35 (8.9)	.04 (1.0)	.10 (2.5)	.12 (3.0)	.24 (6.1)	.54 (14)	1.07 (27)	2.08 (53)	13.95 (354)
Average precipitation days	6.9	7.0	5.5	3.7	1.2	0.3	1.0	1.2	1.7	2.2	4.1	6.2	41
Mean monthly sunshine hours	200	210	270	310	305	295	370	350	290	250	210	205	3,265
Source: The Weather Company

== Economy ==
Businesses and organizations with global, national or major regional headquarters in Corona include:

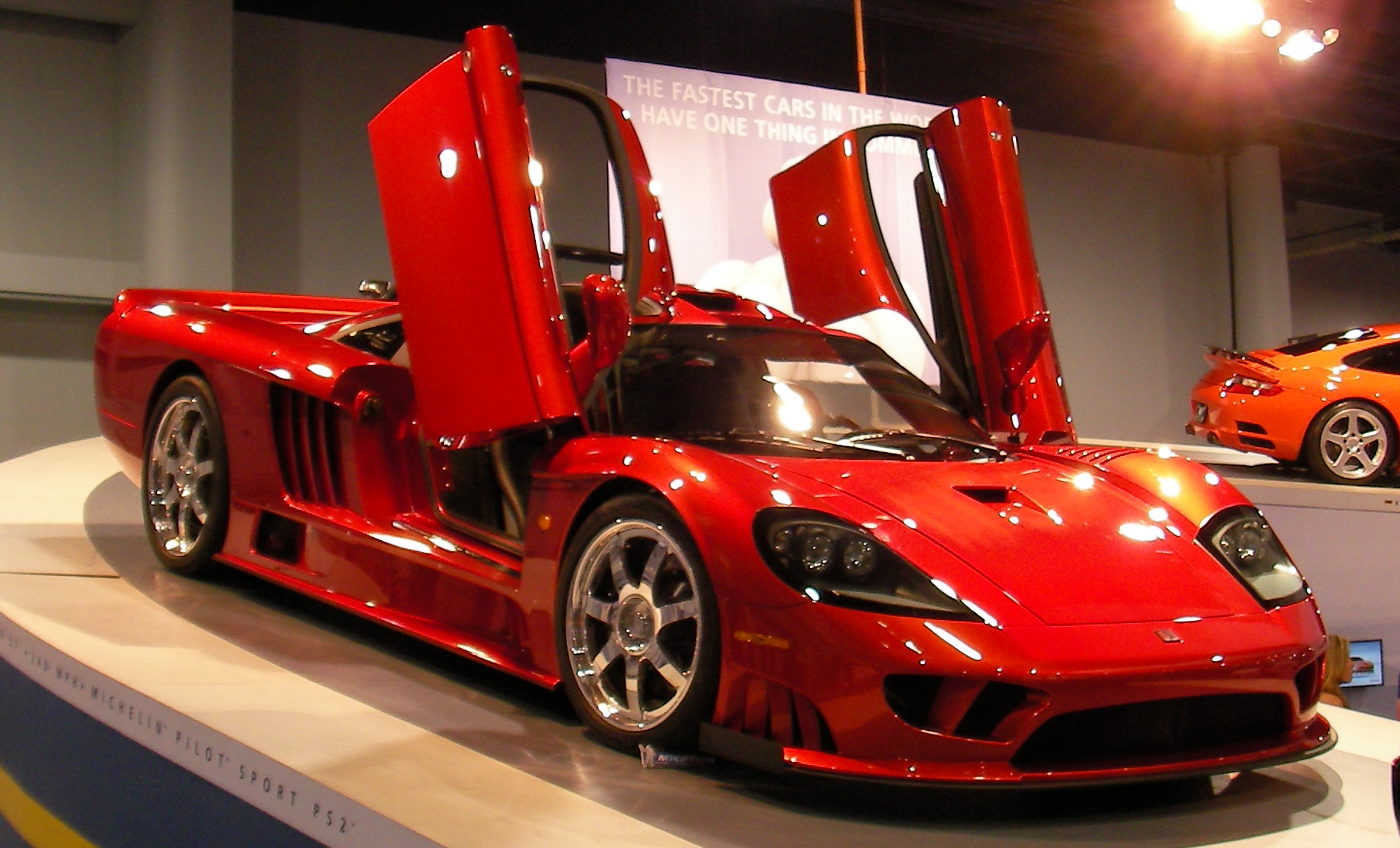
The Saleen S7, manufactured by Saleen

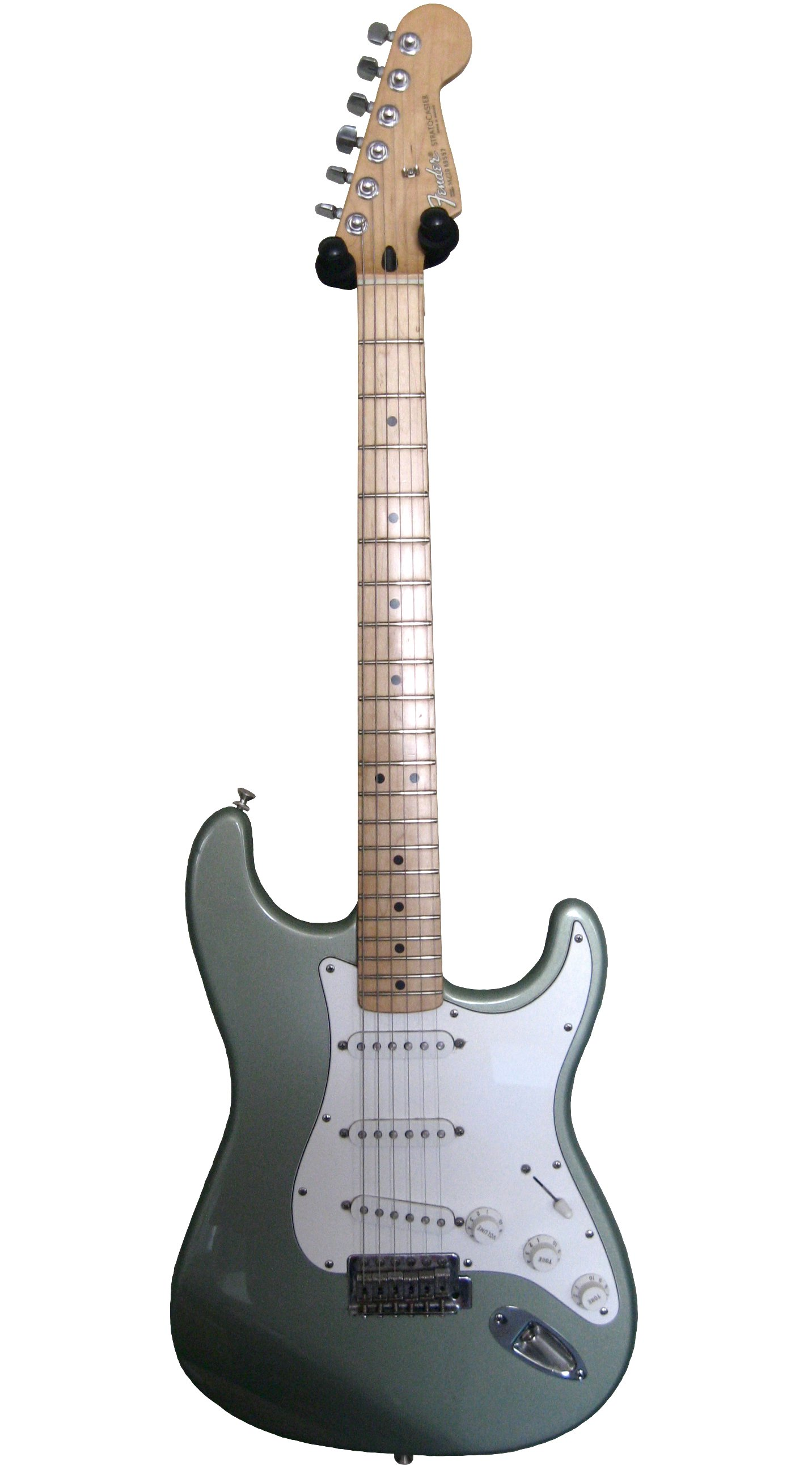
The Stratocaster was released by Fender in 1954

- TCL, a Chinese technology company
- Monster Beverage, a worldwide manufacturer of soft drinks, including Hansen's beverages and the Monster Energy drink line.
- Circle K, an international convenience store chain.
- Saleen, manufacturer of specialty, high-performance sports cars.
- Fender, world-famous manufacturer of electric guitars, amplifiers, and musical equipment. The Fender Custom Shop is also based in the same building.
- Zumiez, youth and action sports clothing and accessory retailer. Corona is home to the Zumiez distribution center.
- Troy Lee Designs, makers of various motocross and mountain bike accessories and apparel.
- LuLaRoe, controversial and legally embattled multi-level marketing distributor of women's apparel.
- Sterno, manufacturers of portable cooking fuel.
- SPJA (Society for the Promotion of Japanese Animation), a 501(c)3 non-profit organization that promotes the Japanese anime industry and related cultures. The SPJA is the organizer for Anime Expo, the largest anime convention in North America.

=== Top employers ===
According to the city's 2024 Comprehensive Annual Financial Report, the top employers in the city are:

#	Employer	# of Employees
1	Corona-Norco Unified School District	5,478
2	Corona Regional Medical Center	1,265
3	Monster Energy	1,075
4	City of Corona	961
5	Fender USA Corona	955
6	All American Asphalt	842
7	TWR Framing Enterprises	800
8	Veg Fresh Farms	527
9	Latitude 36 Foods, LLC	450
10	Thermal Structures	392

== Demographics ==
Historical population
Census	Pop.	Note	%±
1900	1,434		—
1910	3,540		146.9%
1920	4,129		16.6%
1930	7,018		70.0%
1940	8,764		24.9%
1950	10,223		16.6%
1960	13,336		30.5%
1970	27,519		106.4%
1980	37,791		37.3%
1990	76,095		101.4%
2000	124,966		64.2%
2010	152,374		21.9%
2020	157,136		3.1%
U.S. Decennial Census

=== Racial and ethnic composition ===
Corona city, California – Racial and ethnic composition Note: the US Census treats Hispanic/Latino as an ethnic category. This table excludes Latinos from the racial categories and assigns them to a separate category. Hispanics/Latinos may be of any race.
Race / Ethnicity (NH = Non-Hispanic)	Pop 1980	Pop 1990	Pop 2000	Pop 2010	Pop 2020	% 1980	% 1990	% 2000	% 2010	% 2020
White alone (NH)	26,231	45,371	58,784	58,087	49,860	69.41%	59.62%	47.04%	38.12%	31.73%
Black or African American alone (NH)	317	1,938	7,704	8,333	8,136	0.84%	2.55%	6.16%	5.47%	5.18%
Native American or Alaska Native alone (NH)	N/A	384	490	422	461	N/A	0.50%	0.39%	0.28%	0.29%
Asian alone (NH)	N/A	5,188	9,239	14,650	18,482	N/A	6.82%	7.39%	9.61%	11.76%
Native Hawaiian or Pacific Islander alone (NH)	N/A	N/A	353	496	509	N/A	N/A	0.28%	0.33%	0.32%
Other race alone (NH)	827	113	278	272	822	2.19%	0.15%	0.22%	0.18%	0.52%
Mixed race or Multiracial (NH)	N/A	N/A	3,549	3,667	5,764	N/A	N/A	2.84%	2.41%	3.67%
Hispanic or Latino (any race)	10,416	23,101	44,569	66,447	73,102	27.56%	30.36%	35.66%	43.61%	46.52%
Total	37,791	76,095	124,966	152,374	157,136	100.00%	100.00%	100.00%	100.00%	100.00%

=== 2020 ===
The 2020 United States census reported that Corona had a population of 157,136. The population density was 3,934.2 inhabitants per square mile (1,519.0/km^{2}). The racial makeup of Corona was 40.1% White, 5.5% African American, 1.5% Native American, 12.0% Asian, 0.4% Pacific Islander, 23.0% from other races, and 17.3% from two or more races. Hispanic or Latino of any race were 46.5% of the population.

The census reported that 99.3% of the population lived in households, 0.3% lived in non-institutionalized group quarters, and 0.3% were institutionalized.

There were 48,108 households, out of which 41.6% included children under the age of 18, 57.6% were married-couple households, 6.7% were cohabiting couple households, 21.6% had a female householder with no partner present, and 14.2% had a male householder with no partner present. 15.4% of households were one person, and 6.1% were one person aged 65 or older. The average household size was 3.24. There were 38,198 families (79.4% of all households).

The age distribution was 24.3% under the age of 18, 10.3% aged 18 to 24, 27.1% aged 25 to 44, 26.9% aged 45 to 64, and 11.5% who were 65 years of age or older. The median age was 36.3 years. For every 100 females, there were 97.3 males.

There were 49,584 housing units at an average density of 1,241.4 units per square mile (479.3 units/km^{2}), of which 48,108 (97.0%) were occupied. Of these, 63.0% were owner-occupied, and 37.0% were occupied by renters.

In 2023, the US Census Bureau estimated that the median household income was $106,438, and the per capita income was $40,453. About 7.5% of families and 9.1% of the population were below the poverty line.

=== 2010 ===
Ancestry in Corona
Origin	percent
Mexican American	33.7%
German American	11.1%
Irish American	7.0%
English American	6.7%
African American	5.9%
Multiracial American	5.1%
Italian American	4.0%
French American	2.7%
Filipino American	2.3%
Vietnamese American	2.1%
Puerto Rican American	2.1%
Korean American	1.7%
Polish American	1.6%
Indian American	1.4%
Other	18.1%

The 2010 United States census reported that Corona had a population of 152,374. The population density was 3,914.0 inhabitants per square mile (1,511.2/km^{2}). The racial makeup of Corona was 90,925 (59.7%) White (40.1% Non-Hispanic White), 8,934 (5.9%) African American, 1,153 (0.8%) Native American, 16,205 (10.6%) Asian, 552 (0.4%) Pacific Islander, 28,003 (18.4%) from other races, and 7,759 (5.1%) from two or more races. Hispanic or Latino of any race were 66,447 persons (41.9%); 33.7% of Corona's population are Mexican-American, 2.1% Puerto Rican, 1.2% Cuban, 1.2% Salvadoran, 1.1% Guatemalan, 0.5% Colombian, 0.5% Peruvian, 0.5% Argentine, 0.3% Honduran, 0.2% Nicaraguan, and 0.2% Ecuadorian. Among Asian-Americans, 2.3% of Corona's population were Filipino, 2.1% Vietnamese, 1.7% Korean, 1.4% Indian-Americans, 1.1% Chinese, 0.7% Japanese, 0.4% Pakistani, 0.2% Thai, and 0.1% Bangladeshi. The second largest group of Corona's population is made up of White Americans; the largest groups were 11.1% German-American, 6.7% Irish, 6.2% English, 4.0% Italian, 2.7% French, 1.6% Polish, 1.3% Dutch, 1.2% Norwegian, 1.1% Scottish, 1.1% Swedish.

The Census reported that 151,863 people (99.7% of the population) lived in households, 229 (0.2%) lived in non-institutionalized group quarters, and 282 (0.2%) were institutionalized.

There were 44,950 households, out of which 22,735 (50.6%) had children under the age of 18 living in them, 27,357 (60.9%) were opposite-sex married couples living together, 5,971 (13.3%) had a female householder with no husband present, 3,004 (6.7%) had a male householder with no wife present. There were 2,690 (6.0%) unmarried opposite-sex partnerships, and 360 (0.8%) same-sex married couples or partnerships. 6,455 households (14.4%) were made up of individuals, and 2,224 (4.9%) had someone living alone who was 65 years of age or older. The average household size was 3.38. There were 36,332 families (80.8% of all households); the average family size was 3.72.

The population was spread out, with 45,674 people (30.0%) under the age of 18, 15,504 people (10.2%) aged 18 to 24, 44,215 people (29.0%) aged 25 to 44, 35,801 people (23.5%) aged 45 to 64, and 11,180 people (7.3%) who were 65 years of age or older. The median age was 32.5 years. For every 100 females, there were 97.0 males. For every 100 females age 18 and over, there were 94.5 males.

There were 47,174 housing units at an average density of 1,211.8 units per square mile (467.9 units/km^{2}), of which 30,210 (67.2%) were owner-occupied, and 14,740 (32.8%) were occupied by renters. The homeowner vacancy rate was 2.3%; the rental vacancy rate was 5.3%. 103,170 people (67.7% of the population) lived in owner-occupied housing units and 48,693 people (32.0%) lived in rental housing units.

During 2009–2013, Corona had a median household income of $77,123, with 10.8% of the population living below the federal poverty line.

== Government ==
Federal:

- In the United States House of Representatives, Corona is split between two districts, California's 41st congressional district, represented by Republican Ken Calvert, and California's 40th congressional district, represented by Republican Young Kim.
- In the United States Senate, California is represented by Democrats Adam Schiff and Alex Padilla.

State:

- In the California State Senate, Corona is located in the 31st senatorial district, represented by Democrat Sabrina Cervantes, and in the 32nd senatorial district, represented by Republican Kelly Seyarto.
- In the California State Assembly, Corona is located in the 58th Assembly district, represented by Republican Leticia Castillo, and in the 63rd Assembly district, represented by Republican Natasha Johnson

Local:

- In the Riverside County Board of Supervisors, Corona is in the Second District, represented by Karen Spiegel.

== Infrastructure ==
=== Transportation ===
The city's downtown area is circled by Grand Boulevard, which is unique for being perfectly circular. The street is approximately 1 mi (1.6 km) in diameter.

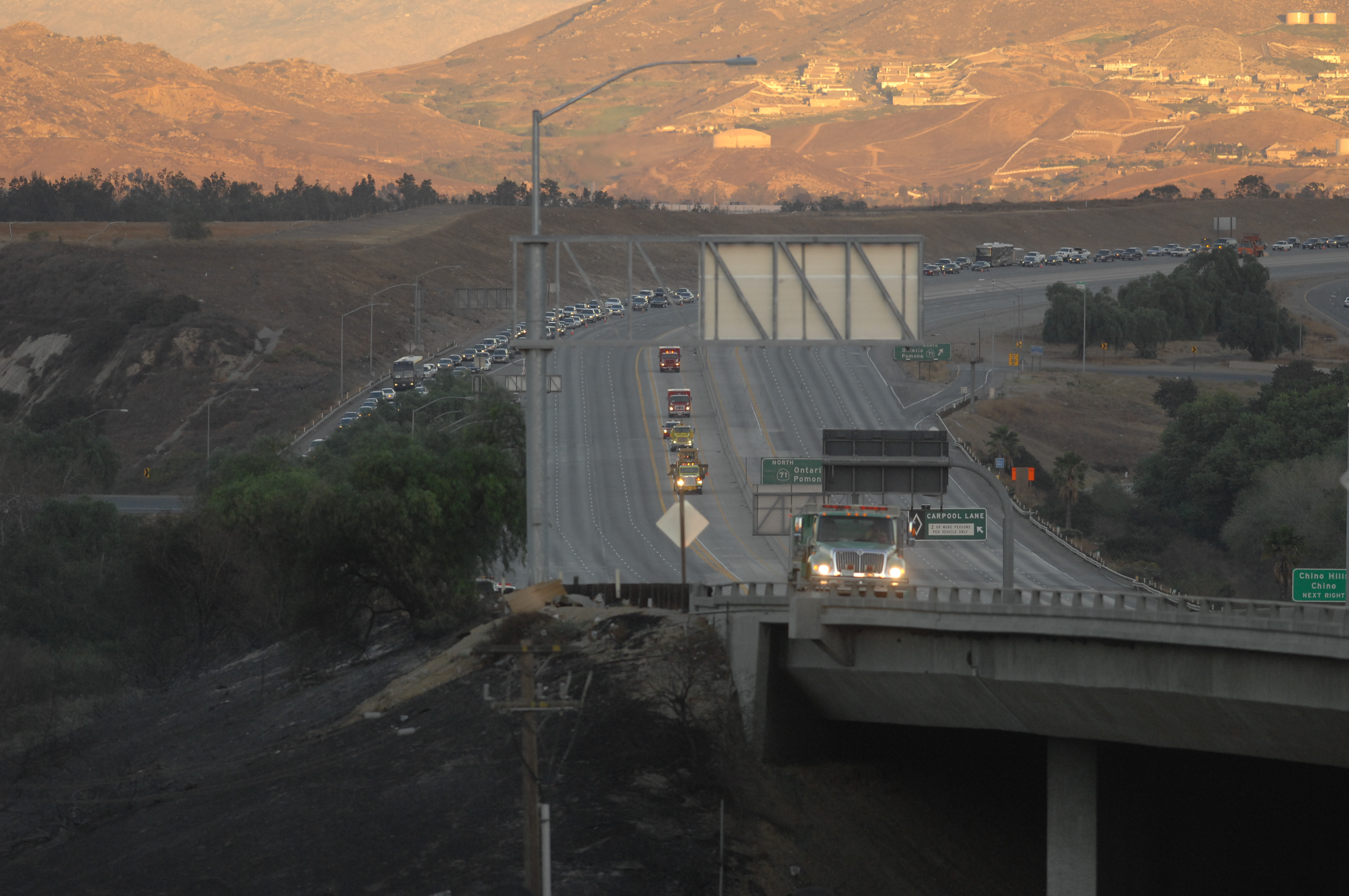
Riverside Freeway (SR 91) interchange with Chino Valley Freeway (SR 71) in western Corona

The city is served by the Corona (SR 71), Interstate 15 (I-15), and Riverside (SR 91) freeways.

There is a proposal to erect a new four-lane freeway along or near Cajalco Road to connect Interstates 15 and 215, although the plan remains controversial. In addition, there is a possibility of constructing a 7.5 mi (12.1 km) tunnel under the Santiago Peak Mountains to the Eastern Transportation Corridor of the FastTrak toll-road company system in Orange, due to increased commuter traffic on State Route 91, which needs to be reduced by another freeway between Orange and Riverside counties.

Corona Municipal Airport (FAA designator: AJO) serves the city and has a 3,200-foot (980 m) runway. On January 20, 2008, two small passenger aircraft collided over Corona, killing all four men aboard the planes and another man on the ground. In the past ten years, there have been five fatal plane crashes around Corona.

==== Public transportation ====
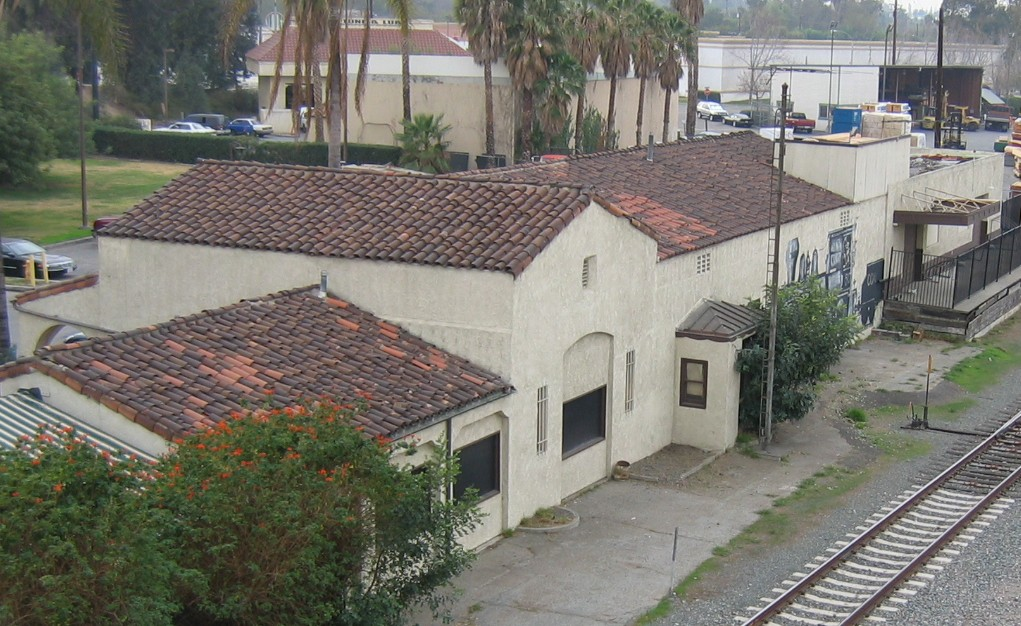
The historic Mission Revival style Corona Station.

The city is linked with the 91/Perris Valley Line and Inland Empire–Orange County Line of the Metrolink commuter rail system, providing service to Los Angeles, Perris, San Bernardino, and Oceanside from Corona–North Main station in the Downtown area and Corona–West station in Corona's west side.

The City of Corona operates its own transportation system called the Corona Cruiser. It consists of two circular routes around the city.

Corona's public transportation also includes the following bus lines: RTA route 1 from West Corona to UC Riverside, RTA route 3 from Corona Regional Medical Center to Swan Lake in nearby Eastvale, RTA route 214 from Downtown Corona to The Village shopping center in Orange, RTA route 206 from Downtown Corona to Temecula, OCTA bus route from Anaheim to South Corona Walmart (Ontario Avenue), and the Corona Cruiser blue and red lines.

=== Healthcare ===
Corona is served by the following three hospitals:

- The Corona Regional Medical Center, a General Acute Care Hospital with Basic Emergency Services as of 2005
- Kaiser Permanente Corona (no emergency services)
- Corona Regional Rehabilitation Hospital

(Emergency services) the city of Corona's fire and emergency medical services are provided by the Corona fire department, with emergency transport being provided by American Medical Response. law enforcement is provided by the city of corona police department, along with the Riverside county sheriff's office.

=== Education ===
The city of Corona is a part of the Corona-Norco Unified School District and the Alvord Unified School District. Corona-Norco serves the majority of the city while Alvord serves a small section of eastern Corona.

There are five high schools in Corona: Corona, Centennial, Lee V. Pollard, Orange Grove, Santiago. There are five middle schools in Corona: Auburndale, Citrus Hills, Corona Fundamental, El Cerrito, Raney.

There are also 28 elementary schools in the city: John Adams, Susan B. Anthony, Cesar Chavez, Corona Ranch, Coronita, Dwight Eisenhower, Foothill, Ben Franklin, Garretson, Home Gardens, Jefferson, Lincoln Alternative, William McKinley, Orange, Parkridge, Prado View, Promenade, Riverview, Ronald Reagan, Sierra Vista, Stallings, Temescal Valley, Dr. Bernice Todd, Vandermolen, Vicentia, Victress Bower, George Washington and Woodrow Wilson.

Private schools include St. Edward Catholic School and Crossroads Christian School.

=== Nonprofit associations ===
The World Mosquito Control Association (WMCA) is located in Corona.

=== Utilities ===
Southern California Edison provides most of the city's electricity and a small part of the city is serviced by Corona Department of Water and Power. Waste Management Inc. provides waste disposal for the city. Southern California Gas Company provides natural gas services.

=== Quarries ===
Corona harbors various Heavy Industrial and Heavy Civil Organizations, including All American Asphalt, 3M, Martin Marietta, Robertsons Ready Mix (Mitsubishi Materials Co.), Vulcan Materials, and FST Sand & Gravel.

=== Cemetery ===
The Corona Sunnyslope Cemetery is a for-profit cemetery established in 1892. Notable burials include USC Trojans athletic director Jess Hill.

=== Corrections ===
California Institution for Women of the California Department of Corrections and Rehabilitation has a "Corona, CA" mailing address, but is in the City of Chino.

== Neighborhoods ==
=== Center City ===
==== Downtown District ====
Centered around Grand Boulevard Historic District (GBHD), Downtown District is the oldest area of the city by far, and encompasses portions of the neighborhoods of Civic Center and Circle City along with the entirety of GBHD.

==== North Main Street District ====
The area north of Grand Boulevard Circle centered around N Main St, named North Main Street District, underwent drastic rebranding, redevelopment, and repair beginning in 2017, particularly on the west side of N Main St. Metro at Main - a large mixed-use development featuring apartments atop retail with additional retail along the property - is a commuter community due to its close proximity to Metrolink's Corona - North Main Station, and both SR 91 and I-15 freeways. The east side of N Main St - particularly E Harrison St and E Blaine ST between N Main St and N Joy St - will be converted to a mixed-use community featuring apartments and retail, further making use of the close proximity to Corona - North Main Station.

==== Historic South Main Street Palms District ====
Beginning at the intersection of S Main St and Olive St - one block south of the Grand Boulevard Circle - Historic South Main Street Palms District is a long stretch of varying species of palms that were planted and integrated into the landscaping plan for South Corona in the early 20th century. It includes all of the houses and businesses along S Main St between Olive St and Chase Dr.

=== Unincorporated communities ===
CENTER CITY | Generally, the areas around N Main St, Grand Boulevard Circle, and S Main St.
Neighborhood	Type	Area (Sq Mi)	Rank by Size	Adoption Date	Minor Neighborhoods | District Overlays	General/Specific Plan
Downtown District	Mixed-Use Downtown	0.979 sq mi	N/A District Overlay		Overlays the following neighborhoods: Circle City (partially); Civic Center (partially); Grand Boulevard Historic District (entirely)	Downtown Revitalization Specific Plan
Grand Boulevard Historic District	Mixed-Use Downtown	0.652 sq mi	#24 / 51		Merrill Park, Ramona, Sheridan Park, Victoria Park	
South Main Street Palm Trees Historic District	Mixed-Use Residential	0.091 sq mi	N/A District Overlay		Overlays slight portions of the following neighborhoods: Buena Vista, Kellogg, Husted Park, Mountain Gate East, Taylor	
North Main Street District	Mixed-Use Commercial	0.397 sq mi	N/A District Overlay	January 5, 2000	Overlays portions of the following neighborhoods: North Main East, North Main West	North Main Street Specific Plan

=== Eastside ===
NORTHEAST | Generally, the area east of N Main St and north of SR 91
Neighborhood	Type	Area (Sq Mi)	Rank by Size	Adoption Date	Minor Neighborhoods | District Overlays	General/Specific Plan
Cimarron	Mixed-Use Residential	0.17 sq mi	#50 / 51	July 1996	Cimarron Estates, The Cimarron	The Cimarron Specific Plan
Corona Hills	Mixed-Use Residential	2.91 sq mi	#1 / 51	January 20, 1982	Cresta Verde, Cresta Verde Heights, East McKinley, Griffin Heights, Northeast Commercial Corridor, Promenade Heights, Tehachapi, West McKinley	Northeast Corona Specific Plan
Corona Ranch	Residential	1.12 sq mi	#10 / 51	November 20, 1985	Parkview, Ranch Vista, Village Park, West Ridge	Corona Ranch Specific Plan
North Main East	Mixed-Use Commercial-Industrial	0.461 sq mi	#32 / 51	January 5, 2000 September 7, 2011	Birtcher Business Center, North Main Street District (Overlay)	North Main Street District Specific Plan Birtcher Business Center Specific Plan
Parkridge	Residential	0.198 sq mi	#48 / 51			

EAST CENTRAL | Generally, the area east of S Main St and north of E Ontario Ave
Neighborhood	Type	Area (Sq Mi)	Rank by Size	Adoption Date	Minor Neighborhoods | District Overlays	General/Specific Plan
Bel Air	Residential	0.182 sq mi	#49 / 51		Bel Air Estates, Monte Olivo	
Circle City	Mixed-Use Residential	0.392 sq mi	#35 / 51		Circle City Bottoms, City Park Historic District (Overlay), Corona Quarry, Downtown District (Overlay)	
Corona Magnolia	Mixed-Use Commercial-Industrial	0.939 sq mi	#14 / 51	September 2002		Corona Magnolia Specific Plan
Eagle Valley	Undeveloped	2.22 sq mi	#3 / 51			
Kellogg Village	Residential	0.488 sq mi	#28 / 51		Garretson Village, South Main St Palm Trees Historic District (Overlay), Kellogg Park	
Pepper Corner	Mixed-Use Residential	1.02 sq mi	#12 / 51		Avian Corner, Centennial Heights, Magnolia Medical Center, Rimpau Ave Palm Trees Historic District (Overlay)	
Sunnyslope	Mixed-Use Residential	0.654 sq mi	#23 / 51		Park-Ford, Sunnyslope Cemetery & Potters Field Historic District (Overlay), Wood Streets	
Temescal Canyon	Mining	1.49 sq mi	#7 / 51			

SOUTHEAST | Generally, the area east of S Main St and south of E Ontario Ave
Neighborhood	Type	Area (Sq Mi)	Rank by Size	Adoption Date	Minor Neighborhoods | District Overlays	General/Specific Plan
Arantine Hills	Mixed-Use Residential	0.852 sq mi	#18 / 51	August 2012	Bedford	Arantine Hills Specific Plan
Cajalco Gateway	Mixed-Use Commercial-Industrial	0.61 sq mi	#25 / 51	May 1, 2002		El Cerrito Specific Plan (SPA01-012)
Chase Ranch	Mixed-Use Residential	0.814 sq mi	#20 / 51	September 20, 1989	Ashwood, Chase Ranch North, Chase Ranch South	Chase Ranch Specific Plan
Cherokee	Mixed-Use Residential	0.303 sq mi	#40 / 51	July 11, 1990	Cherokee Hill, Corona Cerrito North, Corona Cerrito South	Cherokee Specific Plan
Corona Vista	Mixed-Use Residential	1.03 sq mi	#11 / 51	September 19, 1990	Montverde, Ramsgate, Rimpau Ave Palm Trees Historic District (Overlay)	Corona Vista Specific Plan
Dos Lagos	Mixed-Use Residential	.0919 sq mi	#16 / 51	June 21, 2000	Citrus Springs, Owens Cove, Temescal Heights	Dos Lagos Specific Plan
Eagle Glen	Mixed-Use Residential	1.89 sq mi	#4 / 51	October 2, 1991	Edgewood, Village Crest	Eagle Glen Specific Plan
Empire	Residential	0.384 sq mi	#37 / 51	August 28, 1990	California Heights	Empire Homes Specific Plan
Mountain Gate East	Mixed-Use Residential	0.846 sq mi	#19 / 51	June 7, 1989	South Main St Palm Trees Historic District (Overlay)	Mountain Gate Specific Plan
Santana Heights	Mixed-Use Residential	0.771 sq mi	#21 / 51		Garretson Estates, Chase Drive Palm Trees Historic District (Overlay), Kammeyer Ranch Historic District (Overlay), Orange Heights, South Main Street Palm Trees Historic District (Overlay)	
South Cleveland	Residential	0.991 sq mi	#13 / 51	September 2002	Bella Vista Estates, Crown Ranch Estates, Renaissance Estates, Seven Oaks	Crown Ranch Estates Specific Plan

=== Westside ===
NORTHWEST | Generally, the area west of N Main St and north of SR 91
Neighborhood	Type	Area (Sq Mi)	Rank by Size	Adoption Date	Minor Neighborhoods | District Overlays	General/Specific Plan
Auburndale	Mixed-Use Residential	1.28 sq mi	#9 / 51		Central Auburndale, Fairview, River Road, Stagecoach	
Corona Airport & Flood Zone	Flood Control Zone	1.56 sq mi	#6 / 51			
Corona Westgate	Mixed-Use Commercial	0.259 sq mi	#43 / 51	May 20, 1987		Corona Westgate Specific Plan
North Main West	Mixed-Use Residential-Commercial	0.355 sq mi	#38 / 51	January 5, 2000	Corona Corporation Yard Complex, North Main Street District (Overlay), North Main West Industrial Park	
Northwest Industrial District	Mixed-Use Commercial-Industrial	1.84 sq mi	#5 / 51		Butterfield Park, Commerce, Enterprise	
Railroad	Mixed-Use Residential	0.298 sq mi	#41 / 51		Contreras Park, NoRa (North of Railroad St)	

WEST CENTRAL | Generally, the area west of S Main St and north of W Ontario Ave
Neighborhood	Type	Area (Sq Mi)	Rank by Size	Adoption Date	Minor Neighborhoods | District Overlays	General/Specific Plan
Brentwood North	Residential	0.477 sq mi	#29 / 51		Brentwood Park, Saint Matthew's North	
Brentwood South	Residential	0.408 sq mi	#34 / 51		Border Park, Saint Matthew's South	
Brookwood	Residential	0.219 sq mi	#45 / 51	February 5, 1986		Brookwood Specific Plan
Civic Center	Mixed-Use Residential	0.206 sq mi	#46 / 51		Downtown District (Overlay), Fifth Street Village, Seventh Street Bottoms	
Corona West	Mixed-Use Residential	0.593 sq mi	#26 / 51		Avenida, Pleasant View, Sherman Village, Smith Triangle, Yorba Heights	
Lincoln Park	Residential	0.892 sq mi	#17 / 51		ELi (East of Lincoln Ave), WeLi (West of Lincoln Ave)	
Husted Park	Residential	0.141 sq mi	#51 / 51		Jefferson, Merrill Park West, South Main St Palm Trees Historic District (Overlay)	
Taylor	Residential	0.386 sq mi	#36 / 51		South Main St Palm Trees Historic District (Overlay)	
Village Grove	Mixed-Use Residential	0.256 sq mi	#44 / 51			

SOUTHWEST | Generally, the area west of S Main St and south of W Ontario Ave
Neighborhood	Type	Area (Sq Mi)	Rank by Size	Adoption Date	Minor Neighborhoods | District Overlays	General/Specific Plan
Buena Vista	Mixed-Use Residential	0.469 sq mi	#31 / 51		South Main St Palm Trees Historic District (Overlay)	
Crown Ridge	Residential	0.209 sq mi	#46 / 51		Crown Villas	
Heritage Hills	Residential	0.425 sq mi	#33 / 51		Heritage Hill, Mangular Hill (Duckville)	
Highgrove	Residential	0.313 sq mi	#39 / 51	September 2, 1992	Todd Ranch	Todd Ranch Specific Plan
Mountain Gate West	Mixed-Use Residential	1.42 sq mi	#8 / 51	June 7, 1989		Mountain Gate Specific Plan
Oak Creek	Residential	0.475 sq mi	#30 / 51		Oak Avenue Estates, Marvin Tract	
Skyline	Mixed-Use Residential	0.933 sq mi	#15 / 51		Orchard Glen, Skyline Heights, Skyline Village	

FARWEST | Generally, the area west of Paseo Grande and north of Palisades Drive
Neighborhood	Type	Area (Sq Mi)	Rank by Size	Adoption Date	Minor Neighborhoods | District Overlays	General/Specific Plan
Green River	Mixed-Use Residential	0.71 sq mi	#22 / 51		Green River East, Green River Village, Green River West	
Green River Ranch	Undeveloped	0.278 sq mi	#42 / 51	February 21, 2001		Green River Ranch Specific Plan
Sierra Bella	Residential	0.574 sq mi	#27 / 51	August 17, 2005		Sierra Bella Specific Plan
Sierra Del Oro	Mixed-Use Residential	2.45 sq mi	#2 / 51	September 18, 1985	Dominguez Ranch, Prado View, Serfas Club Park, Sierra Palisades	Sierra Del Oro Specific Plan

== Arts and culture ==
=== Performing arts ===
The Arts Alive Council is a non-profit organization created with the purpose to "foster, promote, and increase the public knowledge and appreciation of the arts and cultural activities in the greater Corona Area". Members include the Corona Symphony Orchestra, Circle City Chorale, Christian Arts and Theater, and Corona Dance Academy.

Off Broadway Corona Theater (OBCTheater) is a non-profit organization. They produce two to three theatrical productions each year that are presented at the Corona Civic Center Auditorium.

== Notable people ==
=== Athletes ===
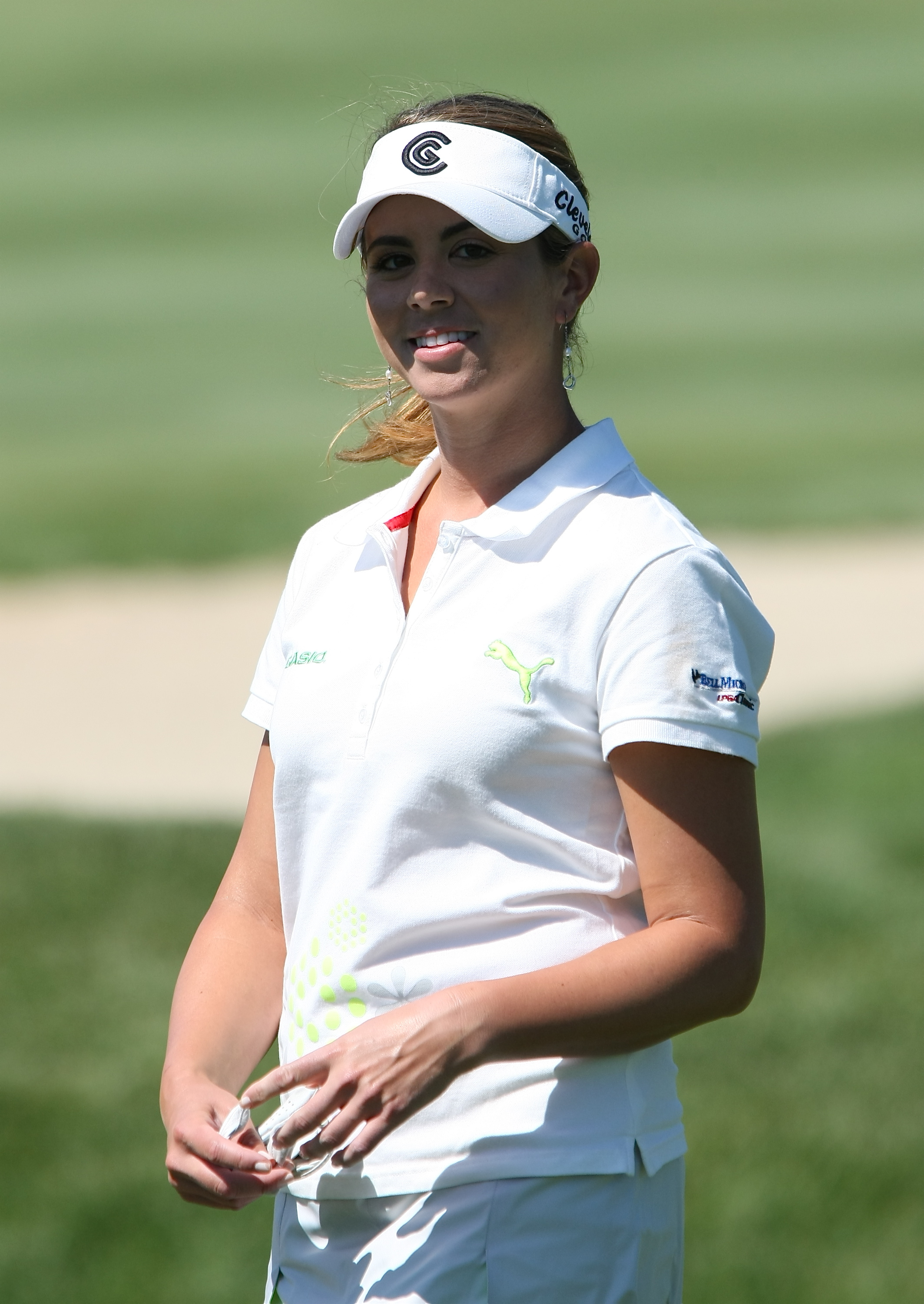
Erica Blasberg

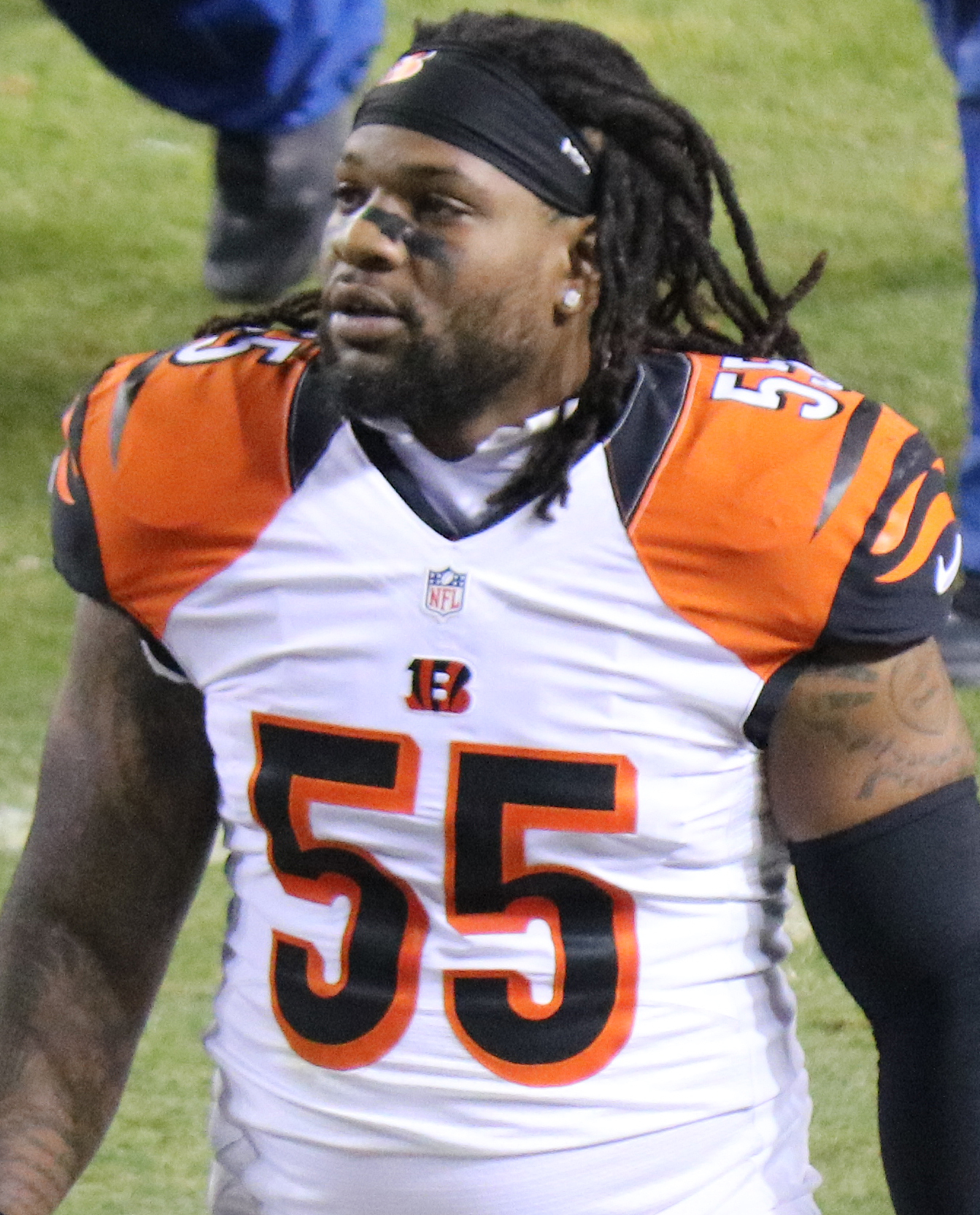
Vontaze Burfict

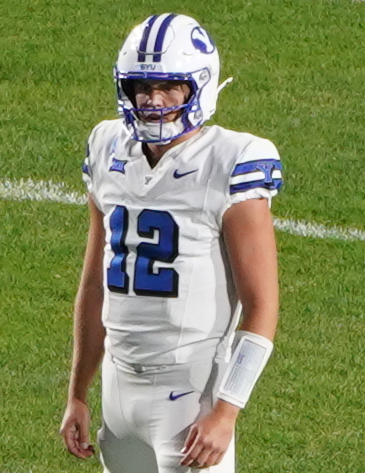
Jake Retzlaff

- Brendan Beck – Major League Baseball (MLB) pitcher for New York Yankees
- Tristan Beck – MLB pitcher for San Francisco Giants
- Erica Blasberg (1984–2010) – LPGA golfer
- Vontaze Burfict – football linebacker
- Camryn Bynum – football player for Indianapolis Colts
- Mike Caffey – Point guard for Crailsheim Merlins of the Basketball Bundesliga.
- Courtney Crone – racing driver
- Mike Darr – MLB outfielder
- Richard Dornbush – figure skater
- Jarren Duran – MLB Outfielder for the Boston Red Sox
- Heath Farwell – football linebacker and coach
- Troy Glaus – former MLB baseball player Los Angeles Angels
- Matt Kalil – football offensive lineman who is currently a free agent
- Ryan Kalil – football offensive lineman for the New York Jets
- Joe Kelly – MLB relief pitcher
- Denny Lemaster (born 1939) – MLB pitcher
- Jason Martin (born 1995) – MLB outfielder
- Taylor Martinez – former quarterback for Nebraska Cornhuskers
- Jared McCain – basketball player for the Oklahoma City Thunder
- Tanner McKee – football player for Philadelphia Eagles
- Taryne Mowatt – All-American softball pitcher for Arizona Wildcats and two-time ESPY Award winner
- Ty Murchison – professional ice hockey player for Philadelphia Flyers in the NHL
- Ricky Nolasco – MLB pitcher for Los Angeles Angels
- Lonie Paxton – former NFL player for New England Patriots and Denver Broncos
- Jake Retzlaff – college American football quarterback
- Chance Sisco – MLB baseball player for Baltimore Orioles
- D. J. Strawberry – professional basketball player
- Sean Strickland – professional mixed martial artist who is the current UFC Middleweight Champion
- Brice Turang – MLB baseball player for Milwaukee Brewers
- Allison Veloz, professional soccer player for Necaxa
- Marcus Alan Williams – football safety for the New Orleans Saints
- Ethan Zubak – soccer player

=== Entertainers ===
- Travis Barker (born 1975) – drummer for Blink-182, Boxcar Racer, The Transplants, and +44
- Larissa "Bootz" Hodge – reality television participant, Flavor of Love 2, Flavor of Love Girls: Charm School
- Tyler Hoechlin – actor known for his role as Derek Hale in Teen Wolf and Superman/Clark Kent in Superman & Lois
- Candy Johnson – dancer and singer in 1960s American International Pictures "beach" movies
- Kerry King (born 1964) – guitarist for Slayer
- Nikki Leonti – singer-songwriter, actress
- Crystal Lewis – Christian music singer, TV actress
- Michael Parks – actor, Kill Bill, Red State, The Happening and other films
- Asia Monet Ray – dancer, recording artist, former Dance Moms cast member
- Jenni Rivera – vocalist, songwriter of banda music
- Jodie Sweetin – actress known for her role as Stephanie Tanner on television sitcoms Full House and Fuller House
- Lil Xan – rapper

=== Other ===
- Ken Calvert – U.S. representative for California
- Cirilo Flores – Roman Catholic bishop
- Alex Harvill (1992–2021) – motorcycle stunt performer
- Shawn Ray – former professional bodybuilder and author
- Gary Webb – investigative journalist

== Sister cities ==
The following are Corona's sister cities as designated by Sister Cities International.

- Fuxin, Liaoning, China
- Gōtsu, Shimane, Japan
- Ocotlán, Jalisco, Mexico
- Silkeborg, Denmark

== See also ==
- Freeway Complex Fire – a 2008 wildfire that started at the Yorba Linda/Corona city limit line.
- Rancho Temescal (Serrano)
- List of U.S. cities with large Hispanic populations
