= Barry Jekowsky =

American musician and music director

Barry Jekowsky is an American musician and music director who founded the California Symphony.

Jekowsky has played with the National Symphony, the Detroit Symphony, and the Reno Philharmonic Orchestra.

Jekowsky left the California Symphony in 2010 after 24 years. He resides in Marin County, California with his wife and 3 children.
