= San Francisco Symphony Youth Orchestra =

Youth orchestra based in San Francisco, California

- Youth Orchestra
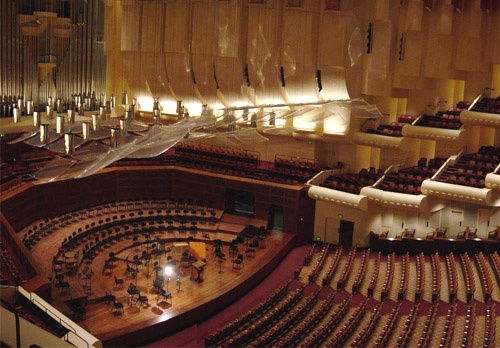
- Interior of Davies Symphony Hall, home to the San Francisco Symphony and the San Francisco Symphony Youth Orchestra
- Short name: SFSYO
- Founded: 1981; 45 years ago
- Location: San Francisco, United States
- Concert hall: Louise M. Davies Symphony Hall at San Francisco War Memorial and Performing Arts Center
- Music director: Radu Paponiu
- Website: sfsymphony.org/EducationCommunity/SFS-Youth-Orchestra
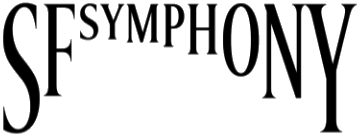

The San Francisco Symphony Youth Orchestra (SFSYO) is a youth orchestra organized by the San Francisco Symphony. The SFSYO performs an annual concert series and has made several recordings. The orchestra rehearses in Louise M. Davies Symphony Hall and has been directed by Radu Paponiu since the 2024–2025 season.

The SFSYO is a tuition-free program, and members of the San Francisco Symphony coach youth orchestra musicians in individual instrument sectionals every Saturday. On occasion, visiting artists associated with the SFS also contribute to the mentorship program, including Yo-Yo Ma, Gustavo Dudamel, and Marin Alsop.

Throughout its history, the SFSYO has performed and recorded in some of the world's principal concert halls including the Elbphilharmonie, Royal Concertgebouw, Wiener Musikverein, Berliner Philharmonie, Mariinsky Theatre, Smetana Hall, and the Théâtre des Champs-Élysées.

Notable performances throughout the SFSYO's history include its 25th anniversary concert in May 2007 with a performance of Beethoven's Symphony No. 9 with the San Francisco Symphony Chorus and soloists from San Francisco Opera; the 1996 performance of John Cage's Renga and Apartment House 1776 with four surviving members of The Grateful Dead joining the orchestra; the 2005 performance of Mahler's Symphony No. 1 (conductor Edwin Outwater's farewell concert as the orchestra's 5th music director); and the 2008 performance of Dvořák's New World Symphony in memory of the SFSYO's benefactor Agnes Albert. In 2009, the orchestra also hosted in the region's first Bay Area Youth Orchestra Festival at Davies Symphony Hall, which is a bi-annual benefit concert where youth orchestras around the Bay Area perform for each other. During these festivals, a Festival Orchestra is also organized consisting of top musicians from the participating youth orchestras, as an opportunity for them to rehearse and perform together.

In 2012, the SFSYO won a 2011–12 ASCAP Award for Adventurous Programming of American Music on foreign tours. Later that year the orchestra released a recording of their performance of Mahler's Symphony No. 1 live at the Berliner Philharmonie. In 2015, the SFSYO was awarded the Best Orchestral Performance Award in the Bay Area for the 2014/2015 season by the San Francisco Classical Voice for their performance of Mahler's Symphony No. 5. In addition to its performance at Davies Symphony Hall, the SFSYO also performed Mahler's Symphony No. 5 at the Teatro Nuovo Giovanni da Udine, Berliner Philharmonie, Royal Concertgebouw, and Smetana Hall during their 2014/2015 season.

== History ==
The SFSYO was first organized in 1981 by Edo de Waart, then music director of the San Francisco Symphony, and Jahja Ling, who became the SFSYO's first music director. Pianist and arts patron Agnes Albert (1908–2002) was also instrumental in its founding. The orchestra's inaugural concert came on January 17, 1982, with a performance of works by Brahms, Dvořák and Haydn, conducted by Ling. In 1986, the SFSYO went on the first of their eleven international tours to date and won the "Vienna Cup" at the Youth and Music Festival and competition in Vienna.

In September 2009, Donato Cabrera was named the 7th music director of the SFSYO and continued the orchestra's concert tradition of combining music by contemporary composers with that of the standard classical repertoire. During his tenure, the orchestra performed contemporary works by Christopher Rouse (Infernal Machine), John Adams (The Chairman Dances), and Gabriela Lena Frank (Latin American Dances for Orchestra).

Under German-born conductor Christian Reif, the SFSYO returned from their 11th international tour. The 17-day European summer tour consisted of six venues in Denmark, Germany, Austria, and Hungary, beginning with the Odense Konzerthaus, Tivolis Koncertsal, Elbphilharmonie, Berliner Philharmonie, Musikverein, and ending with the Budapest Summer Festival. Tour repertoire consisted of Symphony 1 in D Major: 'Titan' by Gustav Mahler, The Tchaikovsky Violin Concerto - with soloists Nicola Benedetti and Karen Gomyo, American Prelude No. 1 by Detlev Glanert. Encores included Slavonic Dance n° 2 in E minor, Op. 72 by Antonín Dvořák, Furioso Polka and Éljen a Magyar! by Johann Strauss II, as well as ending with singing the choral arrangement of Ubi caritas by Maurice Duruflé. Christian Reif joined the San Francisco Symphony as resident conductor and Wattis Foundation Music Director of the SFSYO in the 2016–17 season. Reif led the orchestra in its 35th Anniversary Concert and Celebration on May 13, 2018, which included Stravinsky's Le Sacre du printemps, Fauré's Pelléas et Mélisande, and Ligeti's Concert Românesc.

== Members ==
The SFSYO consists of approximately 100 musicians aged 12–21 from the San Francisco Bay Area. They are chosen by audition and must be under the age of 20 by the time of their first rehearsal. Over the years, many of the orchestra's 1500 alumni have gone on to careers as professional musicians, including composer and pianist Anthony Cheung, winner of the First Prize at the 6th International Henri Dutilleux Competition and the Charles Ives Prize from the American Academy of Arts and Letters; violinist Juliana Athayde, Concertmaster of the Rochester Philharmonic; Noah Bendix-Balgley, first concertmaster of the Berlin Philharmonic; Nicholas Schwartz, double bassist of the Royal Concertgebouw Orchestra; Philip Munds, principal French horn of the Baltimore Symphony Orchestra; Nathan Chan, cellist of the Seattle Symphony; Christina Smith, principal flute of the Atlanta Symphony; Teddy Abrams, music director of the Louisville Orchestra; and Tim Genis, principal timpanist of the Boston Symphony Orchestra.

=== Past concerto competition winners ===
Each year, the SFSYO hosts a concerto competition, where one winner is selected to perform a concerto with the youth orchestra for the following year.

- Leyla Kabuli, pianist (2017–2018), performed Rachmaninoff's 2nd Piano Concerto
- Jonas Koh, marimba (2018–2019), performed Emmanuel Séjourné’s concerto for marimba and strings
- Roger Xia, violinist and pianist (2019–2020), performed Grieg's Piano Concerto in A minor
- Shun Lopez, percussion (2021–2022), performed Hristo Yotsov's Concerto for Drum Set and Symphony Orchestra
- Eunseo Oh, violinist (2022–2023), performed Tchaikovksy's Violin Concerto
- Hiro Yoshimura, violinist (2023–2024), performed Glazunov's Violin Concerto
- Harry Jo, violinist and alto saxophone (2024–2025), performed Takashi Yoshimatsu's Cyber Bird Concerto
- Aaron Ma, violinist (2025–2026), performed Mendelssohn's Violin Concerto in E minor

== Discography ==
- Mahler's Symphony No. 5, recorded live at Davies Symphony Hall, 1994
- Rachmaninoff's Symphony No. 2, at Prague's Dvořák Hall, 1998
- Mahler's Symphony No. 1, recorded live at the Berliner Philharmonie, 2013

== Activities ==
The SFSYO rehearses in Davies Symphony Hall weekly, the home of the San Francisco Symphony, whose members provide tuition-free instrumental coaching. The SFSYO performs multiple times per year in Davies Symphony Hall. Although the orchestra has its own music director, guest conductors such as Simon Rattle, Gustavo Dudamel, Herbert Blomstedt, John Adams (composer), Kurt Masur, Marek Janowski and the SFS's conductor laureate, Michael Tilson Thomas, also work with the young players on occasion. The orchestra performs an annual concert series in Davies Symphony Hall and each year gives Christmas performances of Peter and the Wolf with guest narrators who have included Richard Dreyfuss, Linda Ronstadt, Leonard Nimoy, Florence Henderson, Robin Williams, Rita Moreno, Sid Caesar, Sharon Stone, Danny Glover, Tom Kenny, Zachary Quinto, and Joshua Dela Cruz.

The SFSYO tours every few years; most recently to Europe in the summer of 2019.

The SFSYO's tenth international tour was in the 2014–15 season, during which the orchestra performed in Milan, Udine, Ingolstadt, Berlin, Amsterdam, and Prague.

== Commissions and premieres ==
The orchestra has a tradition of commissioning and premiering new works. Works commissioned by the SFSYO have included:

- David Carlson, Twilight Night (1989)
- Bruce Saylor, Archangel for orchestra with antiphonal brass (1990)
- Richard Danielpour, Song of Remembrance (1992)
- Olly Wilson, Expansions III (1994)
- Tobias Picker, And Suddenly It's Evening (1995)
- Deborah Fischer Teason, Scenes from (1996)
- Robert Kyr, Symphony No. 6, Three Places in the Far West (1997)
- Mark Volkert, Songs from the Sea (2000)

Other works which have been premiered by the orchestra include:

- John McGinn, Fantasia for Orchestra (1983, world premiere)
- David Carlson, Lilacs (Epitaph) (1988, world premiere)
- Deborah Fischer Teason, Empires (1992, world premiere)
- Brooke Joyce, Yniswyrddn (The Isle of Glass) (West Coast premiere)
- Anthony Cheung, Portrait of the Artist as a Tormented Young Madman (2000, world premiere)
- P. D. Q. Bach, Fogel the Mogul (2003, world premiere)
- John Corigliano, Tournaments Overture (2005, California premiere)
- Preben Antonsen, Thresh of Gear (2009, world premiere)
- Nathaniel Stookey, Mahl/er/werk (2013, West Coast premiere)
- Mason Bates, Garages of the Valley (2015, West Coast premiere and European premiere)
- Anahita Abbasi, . . . within the shifting grounds . . . (2018, world premiere)

== Music directors ==
- Jahja Ling (1981–1983)
- David Milnes (1984–1985)
- Leif Bjaland (1986–1988)
- Alasdair Neale (1989–2000)
- Edwin Outwater (2001–2005)
- Benjamin Shwartz (2005–2009)
- Donato Cabrera (2009–2016)
- Christian Reif (2016–2019)
- Daniel Stewart (2019–2024)
- Radu Paponiu (2024-)

== See also ==
- San Francisco Symphony

== Tour Reviews ==
- Sybill Mahlke of Der Tagesspiegel characterized the SFSYO as “brilliant with a strong ensemble” in “Das Jugendorchester aus San Francisco imponiert in der Philharmonie mit Stücken von Mahler und Tschaikowsky.”
- The San Francisco Symphony Youth Orchestra also received a stellar review in Online Merker- Die internationale Kulturplattform "Standing Ovations und ein a cappella Chor zum Abschied" by Dr. Ingobert Waltenberger
- Janos Gereben wrote for San Francsico Classical Voice, "SF Symphony Youth Orchestra Conquers Europe"
- Joshua Kosman of the San Francisco Chronicle wrote "Youth Orchestra sharpens up in sectional sessions with SF Symphony mentors"
- Jeannie Psomas, a member of the SFSYO writes on the orchestra's 2004 European tour for the San Francisco Chronicle in "Boggled by Berlin, where East meets West"
