= Noah Bendix-Balgley =

American violinist

- Born: July 15, 1984 (age 42); Asheville, North Carolina, U.S.
- Genre: Classical
- Occupations: First Concertmaster of Berliner Philharmoniker; Concertmaster of Pittsburgh Symphony Orchestra (2011–2014)
- Instrument: Violin

Noah Bendix-Balgley (born July 15, 1984) is an American classical violinist. He is currently First Concertmaster with the Berliner Philharmoniker. He served as concertmaster of the Pittsburgh Symphony Orchestra from 2011 to 2014.

== Biography and career ==
Noah Bendix-Balgley was born on July 15, 1984, in Asheville, North Carolina. He began playing the violin at age four. He attended the Crowden School in Berkeley, California, and was concertmaster in the San Francisco Symphony Youth Orchestra. He then went on to study with Mauricio Fuks at Indiana University in Bloomington, Indiana, and later at the Hochschule für Musik und Theater München, where he worked with pedagogue Ana Chumachenco. He plays a 1732 Bergonzi violin that had previously been owned by Nigel Kennedy.

Bendix-Balgley has won prizes in a number of competitions. In 2008, he won third prize, together with a special prize for creativity, at the Long-Thibaud-Crespin Competition in Paris, and he was a laureate of the 2009 Queen Elisabeth Competition in Brussels. In 2011, he won first prize at the Vibrarte International Music Competition in Paris, and was awarded first prize, and a special prize for best Bach interpretation, at the 14th International Violin Competition "Andrea Postacchini" in Fermo, Italy.

Bendix-Balgley has performed as a soloist with orchestras around the world, including the Pittsburgh Symphony Orchestra, the Orchestre Philharmonique de Radio France, the Orchestre National de Belgique, I Pomeriggi Musicali of Milan, Orchestra Filarmonica Marchigiana (Italy), Orchestre Royal Chambre de Wallonie (Belgium), the Binghamton Philharmonic, and the Erie Philharmonic. From 2011 to 2014, he was Concertmaster of the Pittsburgh Symphony Orchestra, and in 2014 he joined the Berliner Philharmoniker as 1st Concertmaster.

As a chamber musician, Bendix-Balgley was the first violinist of the Athlos String Quartet, in Munich, from 2008 to 2011, and performed throughout Europe. This quartet won a special prize at the 2009 Felix Mendelssohn-Bartholdy Competition in Berlin. In 2011, he performed with the Miro String Quartet, on a North American tour. He has performed with artists such Gidon Kremer, Yuri Bashmet, Gary Hoffman, Emanuel Ax, Lars Vogt, and percussionist Colin Currie, and has performed at many festivals in Europe and North America, including the Verbier Festival, the Sarasota Festival, ChamberFest Cleveland, the Nevada Chamber Music Festival and Chamber Music Connects the World in Kronberg, Germany. He also enjoys performing klezmer music in his spare time, and has played with groups such as the Pittsburgh Symphony Orchestra and Brave Old World. He has taught klezmer violin around the world.

In 2013, he joined the Carnegie Mellon School of Music, where he has been an artist lecturer, coaching student string quartets.
