= Grand Boulevard (Corona) =

- Grand Boulevard Historic District
- U.S. National Register of Historic Places
- U.S. Historic district
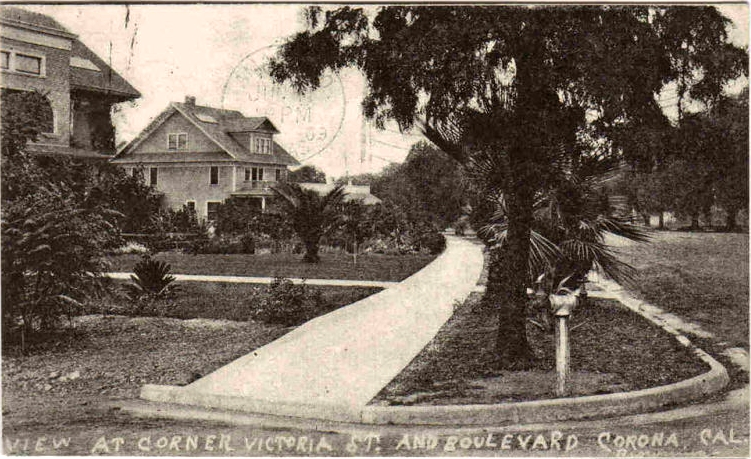
- A residential neighborhood at Grand Boulevard and Victoria Street in the early 1900s
- Coordinates: 33°52′09″N 117°34′02″W
- Architect: Hiram Clay Kellogg
- NRHP reference No.: 11000432
- Added to NRHP: July 14, 2011

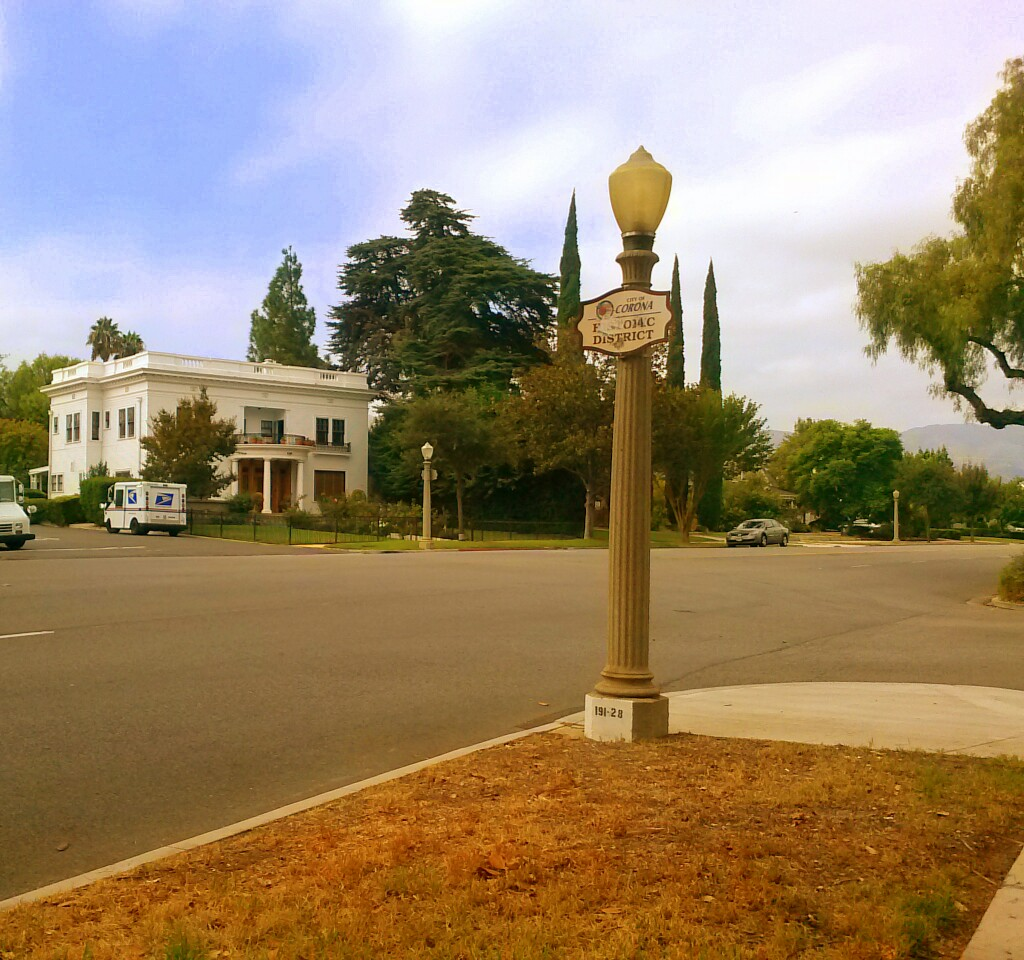
Grand Boulevard Historic District sign, 2013

Grand Boulevard is a beltway in Corona, California that was recognized by the National Register of Historic Places in 2011 as a part of the Grand Boulevard Historic District.

It is an ordinary surface street that circles the city's historic downtown area and is approximately half a mile from the city center. It is unusual for being perfectly circular. The street was designed by Hiram Clay Kellogg (In memory of him, there is a street in Corona named Kellogg Street). Grand Boulevard was home to international races in 1913, 1914 and 1916. Grand is easily accessible from the Main Street exit on California State Route 91.
