= Alex Harvill =

American motorcycle stuntman (1992–2021)

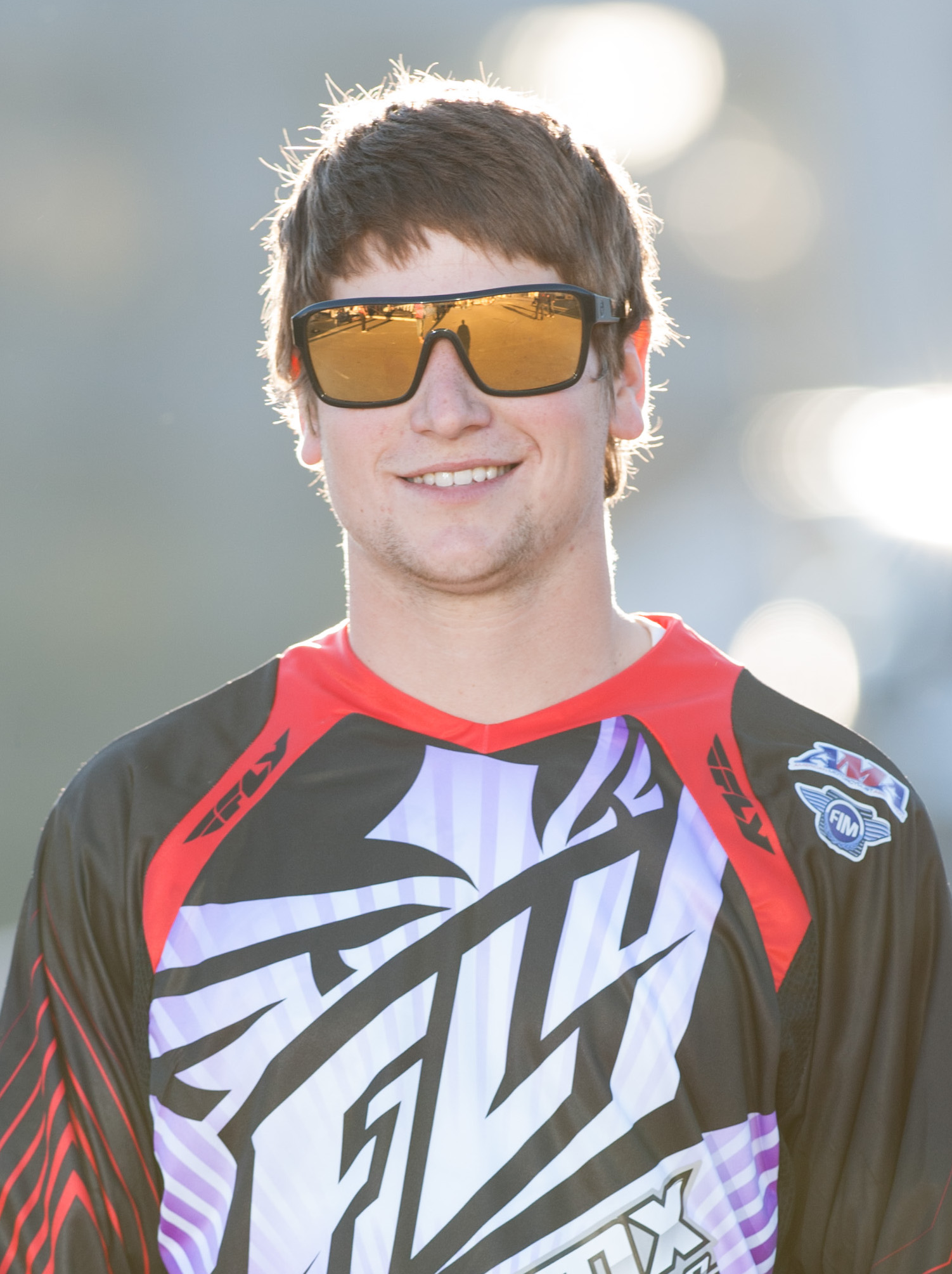
- Harvill in 2014
- Born: September 11, 1992; Corona, California, U.S.
- Died: June 17, 2021 (aged 28); Grant County, Washington, U.S.
- Cause of death: Practice collision
- Occupation: Stunt performer
- Children: 2

Alex Harvill (September 11, 1992 – June 17, 2021) was an American motocross racer and stunt performer. On May 12, 2012, he set a Guinness World Record for the longest ramp-to-dirt motorcycle jump at 425 feet (129.54 m). On July 6, 2013, he set a Guinness World Record for the longest dirt-to-dirt motorcycle jump at 297.55 feet (90.69 m). He died in 2021 during an attempt at breaking a world record motorcycle distance jump.

== Biography ==
Harvill was born in Corona, California, on September 11, 1992. He had a strong interest in riding bikes since he was four years old. He was a professional motocross and supercross racer. He competed in the American AMA and Canadian Pro Motocross series. On May 12, 2012, Harvill set a Guinness World Record for the longest ramp-to-dirt motorcycle jump. Jumping 425 feet (129.54 m) at Toes MX Park in Royal City, Washington. On July 6, 2013, Harvill set a Guinness World Record for the longest dirt-to-dirt motorcycle ramp jump, jumping 297.55 feet (90.69 m) at the Horn Rapids Motorsports Complex in West Richland, Washington. In April 2017, during a practice ramp-to-ramp jump at the Talladega Superspeedway, Harvill took off with great speed over shooting the landing ramp. He landed with such force that his front tire exploded, sending him flying over his handlebars and breaking one of his heels when he hit the ground. His attempt at a world record motorcycle jump at Talladega Superspeedway on May 7 (during the Monster Energy at the 2017 Geico 500 Monster Energy NASCAR Cup Series Race) was subsequently canceled due to the injury.

== Death and aftermath ==
On June 17, 2021, Harvill was scheduled to perform a ramp jump at the Moses Lake Airshow, being held at Grant County International Airport in Washington, in an attempt to break a 351-foot (107 m) record set by Australian biker Robbie Maddison in 2008. This jump would have been equivalent to the length of an American football field from goalpost to goalpost. On a practice jump, Harvill crashed into the top edge of the dirt landing ramp and was thrown from his bike, flying 20 feet (6.1 m) and losing his helmet. The accident was filmed by a news crew from KREM in Spokane, Washington, which did not broadcast footage of the crash out of respect. Medical personnel were standing by due to the dangerous nature of the stunt; an emergency medical technician reached Harvill about two and a half minutes after the crash. Harvill died en route to a hospital.

On June 18, 2021, the Grant County Sheriff's Office announced that an autopsy would be conducted to determine the exact cause of Harvill's death. According to the findings released by the Grant County Coroner's office on June 19, 2021, Harvill sustained blunt force trauma to the torso which led to his death and that the impact from the handlebars on the motorbike was the likely cause of the deadly injuries. A public memorial was held for Harvill on June 30 in his hometown of Ephratra.

In August 2022, Guinness World Records officially approved and recognized his May 12, 2012, 425-foot (129.54 m) ramp-to-dirt motorcycle jump.

=== Reactions ===
Hours after the initial incident, Robbie Maddison posted his condolences to Harvill and his family via Instagram, saying he was "shattered" by the news, also stating "[He] was out to set a new world record today when he paid the ultimate price. My heart is broken for his family." On June 18, Guinness World Records posted a statement via Twitter that read "We are saddened to learn of the passing of record holder and motorcycle stunt rider, Alex Harvill. Our thoughts and deepest condolences are with his family and friends."

== Personal life ==
Harvill lived in Ephrata, Washington. Harvill worked at a farm in Othello as his main occupation and considered his motorcycle stunt career a passion. He had a wife and two sons.
