= Rheem Theatre =

American motion picture theater

Coordinates: 37.86050°N 122.12687°W

The Rheem Theatre is a motion picture theater located in Moraga, California. Built in 1957 by Donald Rheem, of Rheem Manufacturing Company, it was originally a 1,000-seat single screen movie theater. It was later used as a concert venue. In 1998 it was remodeled to host four screens. In January 2018 Rheem Theatre closed its doors for what seemed to be the last time. In light of the closing, the Moraga Town Council interceded on behalf of the community, helping the owners reach an agreement with the town to re-open the theater. In April 2019, the property was purchased by Cinema West and the Town of Moraga approved a 2-auditorium addition. The theater subsequently underwent an extensive renovation, which included removal of the stage platform in the main auditorium and installation of a 60-foot screen, Dolby Atmos and reclining seats and restoration of the theater's original finishes, reopening in December 2019.

In addition to hosting the premiere of The Green Book with Mahershala Ali after re-opening in 2018, there have been many notable artists that performed in Rheem including: Kansas, Johnny Cash, Chris Isaak, The Righteous Brothers, Jefferson Starship and Chubby Checker.
