= Donato Cabrera =

American conductor

- Born: Pasadena, California, United States
- Occupations: Musician, Conductor
- Years active: 1997 -
- Website: www.donatocabrera.com

Donato Cabrera is an American conductor with an active international career. He is the artistic director and music director of the California Symphony, and was the resident conductor of the San Francisco Symphony and Wattis Foundation Music Director of the San Francisco Symphony Youth Orchestra from 2009 to 2016.

== Education and early career ==
Cabrera was born in Pasadena, California and grew up in Las Vegas, Nevada and Reno, Nevada. He then studied at the University of Nevada, the School of Music at the University of Illinois Urbana-Champaign, Indiana University School of Music, and the Manhattan School of Music. He made his professional debut with the Reno Chamber Orchestra in 1997 and in 1998 made his European debut conducting the Zwei Groschen Oper Summer Festival productions of The Barber of Seville, Rigoletto, and Tosca.

While based in New York, Cabrera served as an assistant conductor to Zdenek Macal at the New Jersey Symphony where Cabrera went on to work as cover conductor for the symphony's subscription series and Guest Conductor for its education and outreach Concerts until 2006. He concurrently had various guest conducting engagements including concerts for the Music Academy of the West in 2003 and the Norwalk Youth Symphony Orchestra and Fort Worth Symphony Orchestra in 2004.

Cabrera co-founded ACME (American Contemporary Music Ensemble) with cellist Clarice Jensen and publicist Christina Jensen in 2004 and was the ensemble's music director for its inaugural season, conducting works by John Adams, Jacob Druckman, Donald Martino, Frederic Rzewski, and Elliott Carter. He also worked as an assistant to James Conlon at the 2004 Spoleto Festival and the 2005 Ravinia Festival.

== 2005 to the present ==
He made his house debut at Portland Opera in December 2005 conducting The Rape of Lucretia. Cabrera joined San Francisco Opera in the 2005/2006 season as an associate conductor preparing the casts and conducting the initial rehearsals of several productions including the world premiere of John Adams's Doctor Atomic and remained there until 2008. He made his conducting debut at SFO in May 2006 for the company's Opera in the Gardens concert and went on to conduct performances of Die Fledermaus (October 2006), Don Giovanni (June 2007), Die Zauberflöte (October 2007), and Tannhäuser (October 2007). In March 2008, he made his debut with Berkeley Opera conducting a production of L'elisir d'amore. The following autumn, he was engaged by the Metropolitan Opera as an assistant and cover conductor for a new production of Doctor Atomic.

Cabrera's symphonic conducting career continued in parallel with his work as an opera conductor. Cabrera has made debuts with the London Symphony Orchestra, Houston Symphony, National Symphony Orchestra's KC Jukebox at the Kennedy Center, the Saint Paul Chamber Orchestra, the Louisville Orchestra, Hartford Symphony Orchestra, Kalamazoo Symphony Orchestra, New Haven Symphony, Greensboro Symphony, New West Symphony, Sinfónica de Oaxaca, and the Orquesta Filarmónica de Boca del Rio. In 2016, Cabrera led the Chicago Symphony Orchestra in performances with Grammy Award-winning singer Lila Downs. He made his Carnegie Hall and Cal Performances debuts leading the world premiere and California premieres, respectively, of Mark Grey's Ătash Sorushan. He made his San Francisco Symphony debut in April 2009 when he conducted the orchestra with 24 hours notice.

In 2009 Cabrera joined the San Francisco Symphony staff as the resident conductor and Wattis Foundation Music Director of the San Francisco Symphony Youth Orchestra. In December of that year he also made his debut with the San Francisco Ballet, conducting The Nutcracker and became one of a handful of conductors who have conducted performances for all three of San Francisco's major musical institutions. Cabrera frequently conducted the San Francisco Symphony in a variety of concerts, including all of the education and family concerts, reaching over 70,000 children throughout the Bay Area every year. He also led the San Francisco Symphony Chorus with Paul Jacobs on organ in the world premiere of Mason Bates’ Mass Transmission, subsequently conducting it in Carnegie Hall. During his seven seasons as music director of the San Francisco Symphony Youth Orchestra, Cabrera took the group on two European tours, winning an ASCAP Award for Adventurous Programming of American Music on Foreign Tours, and receiving critical acclaim for its live recording from the Berlin Philharmonie of Mahler's Symphony No. 1.

In 2013, Cabrera was appointed music director of the California Symphony. and in April 2023 the orchestra also added the role of artistic director to Cabrera's title. Cabrera was music director of the Green Bay Symphony 2011-2014, New Hampshire Music Festival 2013-2016, and the Las Vegas Philharmonic 2014-2024

Awards and fellowships include a Herbert von Karajan Conducting Fellowship at the Salzburg Festival and conducting the Nashville Symphony in the League of American Orchestra's Bruno Walter National Conductor Preview. Donato Cabrera was recognized by the consulate-general of Mexico in San Francisco as a Luminary of the Friends of Mexico Honorary Committee, for his contributions to promoting and developing the presence of the Mexican community in the Bay Area.
