= Association of California Symphony Orchestras =

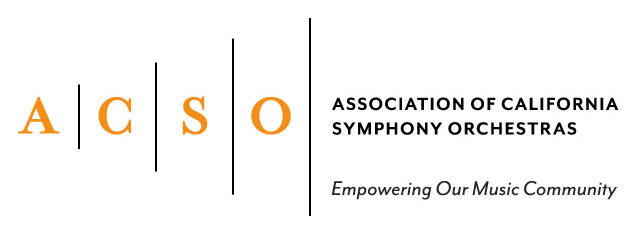
- Abbreviation: ACSO
- Formation: 1969
- Headquarters: Los Angeles
- Website: acso.org

The Association of California Symphony Orchestras (ACSO) is a non-profit trade association based in Los Angeles. It was founded in 1969 by a small group of orchestra managers, and currently serves over 150 organizations and their 2,000 board and staff members. ACSO's members are professional, academic, youth, and community-based orchestras, choruses, and festivals in California and the western region. The members of its board of directors are leaders from the classical music community throughout the state of California and western region. ACSO's headquarters are in Los Angeles with additional staff in Sacramento. ACSO's first executive director was Kris Sinclair, who retired after 31 years. Mitch Menchaca succeeded Sinclair in 2016, and Sarah Weber is the current executive director.

== Programs & Services ==
ACSO offers a variety of programs and services for its members and the field. These professional and organizational development opportunities address orchestra management, board/governance, and artistic issues.

== Governance ==
=== Board Officers ===
Officers for 2021-2022 are:

- Alice Sauro, President
- Steve Friedlander, Treasurer
- Loribeth Gregory-Beck, Secretary
- Scott Vandrick, Vice President

=== Board Members ===
Members for 2021-2022 are:

- Jessica Bajarano
- Nora Brady
- Chelsea Chambers
- Amanda Wu Chroust
- Jeri Crawford
- Alicia Gonzalez
- Mieko Hatano
- Jamei Hawell
- Kathryn R. Martin
- Dean McVay
- Akilah Morgan
- Nicola Reilly
- Jonathan Rios
- Elizabeth Shribman
- Amber Joy Weber
- Donna M. Williams
- John Wineglass
