= Corona Municipal Airport =

- IATA: none; ICAO: KAJO; FAA LID: AJO

Summary
- Airport type: Public
- Operator: City of Corona
- Serves: Corona, Riverside
- Location: Corona, California
- Elevation AMSL: 533 ft (162 m)
- Coordinates: 33°53′52″N 117°36′09″W
- Website: City of Corona
- Interactive map of Corona Municipal Airport

Runways
Direction	Length		Surface
Direction	ft	m	Surface
7/25	3,200	975	Asphalt

Statistics (2004)
- Aircraft operations: 68,000
- Based aircraft: 414
- Source: Federal Aviation Administration

Corona Municipal Airport (ICAO: KAJO, FAA LID: AJO), formerly L66, is three miles northwest of Downtown Corona, serving Riverside County, California, United States. The airport has a few businesses, such as a cafe, "Flying Academy" flight training center, and aircraft maintenance and repair.

Most U.S. airports use the same three-letter location identifier for the FAA and IATA, but Corona Municipal Airport is AJO to the FAA and has no IATA code (Aljouf, Yemen has IATA code AJO).

== Facilities ==
Corona Municipal Airport covers 98 acres (40 ha) and has one asphalt runway, (7/25), 3,200 x 60 ft (975 x 18 m).

In 2004, the airport had 68,000 aircraft operations, average 186 per day, all general aviation. 414 aircraft are based at the airport: 90% single engine, 6% multi-engine, 2% helicopter, 1% ultralight, and 1% jet.

== Incidents ==
The city of Corona had seven aircraft incidents between 1998 and 2024.

On March 19, 1998, a Cessna 152 clipped a private twin-engine plane, causing both planes to crash. The Cessna descended onto the corner roof of an apartment complex near the intersection of Chalgrove Drive and Border Avenue. No one was injured on the ground, but both pilots died.

On January 21, 2008, two private planes collided in Corona, killing five people, including one on the ground. The collision occurred about a mile away from the Corona Municipal Airport above Serfas Club Drive. The crash wreckage left debris strewn along a commercial strip near the 91 Freeway. Eyewitnesses claimed to have seen an explosion in the air and two different bodies fall from the sky. The aircraft involved were both single-engine Cessnas, a two-seat Cessna 150 and a four-seat Cessna 172. Investigators from the National Transportation Safety Board, local Corona police detectives, and the Federal Aviation Administration began their probe the following day. The cause was that the pilots were not aware of each other's aircraft.

On July 26, 2008 at approximately 13:47 local time, a baby blue and white 1947 Ercoupe stalled upon takeoff when turning crosswind and crashed into the forest on the southwest side of the airport. Eyewitnesses said that the two elderly pilots had minor injuries, with one of them bleeding from his right cheek where the yoke struck him upon impact. Both survived the crash.

On November 25, 2012 at approximately 23:00 local time, a Robinson R44 helicopter clipped a refueling station canopy and exploded shortly thereafter. A review of airport video footage showed the helicopter was facing toward the station, lifted off, made a 180-degree turn to the right and tilted forward with its tail coming up immediately prior to the explosion. The solo pilot of the aircraft was fatally injured.

On January 22, 2020 shortly after 12:00 local time, a Beech Bonanza airplane crashed during a failed takeoff attempt. All four passengers aboard were killed.

On December 16, 2023, a Van's RV-8 home-built aircraft crashed during a failed takeoff attempt, and the pilot perished to the accident.

On April 9, 2024, a Beechcraft A36 Bonanza unit, registered as N6679X, suffered a gear-up landing on the runway. No injuries were reported.
