= Seven Oaks =

Seven Oaks or Sevenoaks may refer to:

Canada

- Seven Oaks (electoral district), in Winnipeg, 1956–89
- Seven Oaks General Hospital, Winnipeg
- Seven Oaks School Division
- Seven Oaks House Museum
- Seven Oaks Sportsplex
- Battle of Seven Oaks (1816)
- Morningside, Toronto, alternate name for the neighbourhood

United States (by state)

- Seven Oaks Dam, California
- Seven Oaks Reservoir, California
- Seven Oaks (Dahlonega, Georgia), listed on the NRHP in Georgia
- Seven Oaks (Sac City, Iowa), listed on the NRHP
- Seven Oaks, Maryland
- Seven Oaks Estate, Palisades, New York, listed on the NRHP
- Seven Oaks (Asheville, North Carolina), listed on the NRHP
- Seven Oaks, Bluffton, South Carolina
- Seven Oaks, South Carolina
- Seven Oaks, Texas
- Seven Oaks Farm and Black's Tavern, Greenwood, Virginia, listed on the NRHP

United Kingdom

- Sevenoaks, a Commuter town in Kent, England
  - Sevenoaks (district)
  - Sevenoaks (UK Parliament constituency)
  - Sevenoaks railway station
  - Sevenoaks Preparatory School
  - Sevenoaks School
  - Sevenoaks Town F.C.
  - Sevenoaks Wildlife Reserve
- Sevenoaks Weald, a village in Kent
