= Bear Creek (Santa Ana River tributary) =

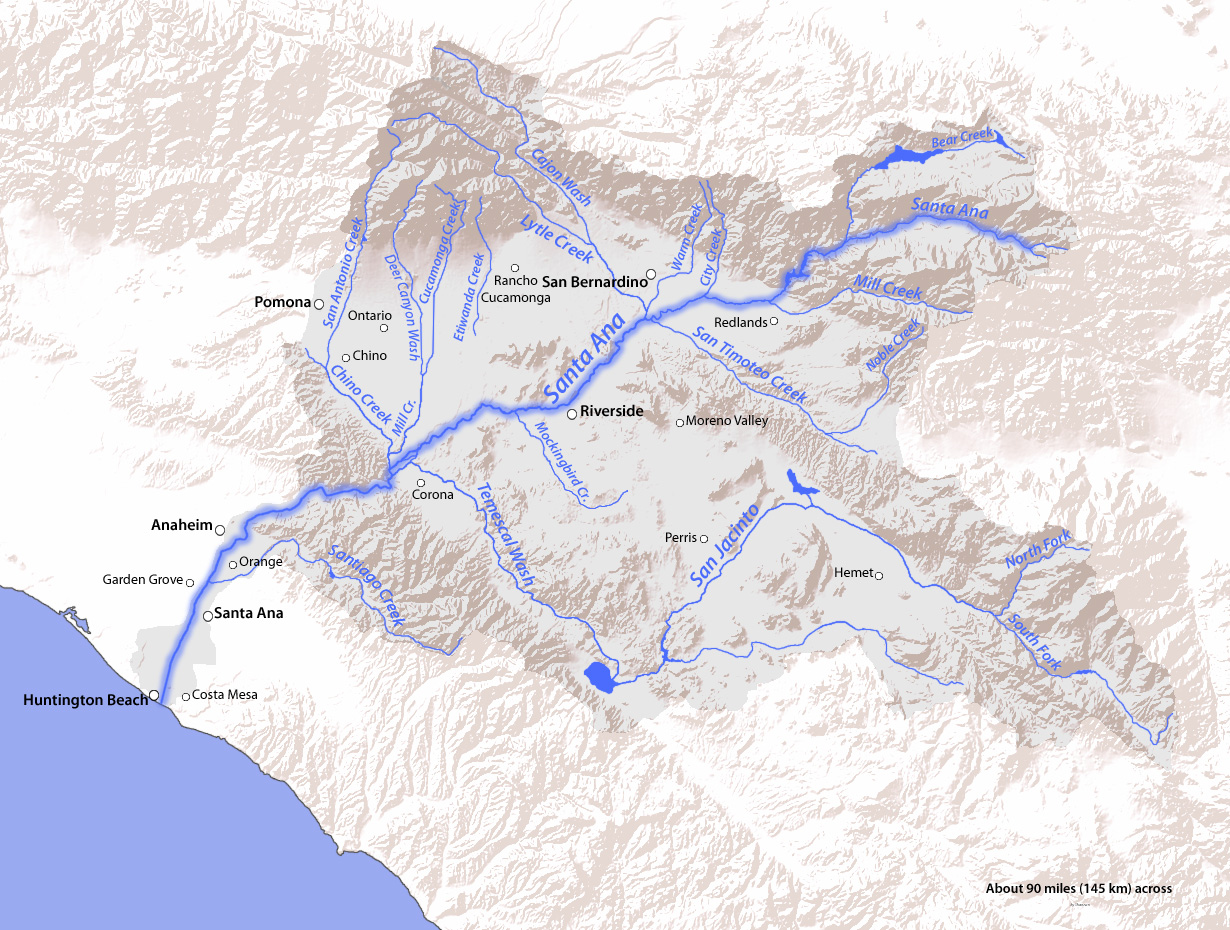
- Map of the Santa Ana River drainage basin
- Etymology: Big Bear Valley

Location
- Country: United States
- State: California
- Counties: San Bernardino

Physical characteristics
- Source: Baldwin Lake area
  - location: San Bernardino Mountains, San Bernardino National Forest
  - coordinates: 34°16′26″N 116°48′31″W
- Mouth: Santa Ana River
  - location: Seven Oaks Reservoir
  - coordinates: 34°09′37″N 117°0′54″W
  - elevation: 2,605 ft (794 m)
- Length: 17 mi (27 km)
- Discharge
  - location: Santa Ana River, Seven Oaks Reservoir

Basin features
- Tributaries
  - left: Siberia Creek

Bear Creek is an approximately 17-mile (27 km) tributary of the Santa Ana River in the San Bernardino Mountains of the U.S. state of California.

== Course ==
The course of Bear Creek is entirely contained within San Bernardino County, and primarily within the San Bernardino National Forest.

It rises near the community of Woodlands, and flows north into Baldwin Lake in the eastern Big Bear Valley. From there it flows west past the town of town of Big Bear City and the city of Big Bear Lake into Bear Valley, where since 1912 it has been impounded by a dam to form Big Bear Lake reservoir.

Downstream of the dam it receives Siberia Creek from the left, and plunges suddenly into a steep and narrow canyon, and empties into the Santa Ana River just upstream of Seven Oaks Dam, which in wet years, impounds water on the Santa Ana River past the Bear Creek confluence.

== See also ==
- List of tributaries of the Santa Ana River
- List of rivers of California
- San Bernardino Mountains topics
