= San Antonio Dam (San Bernardino County) =

- Interactive map of San Antonio Dam
- Location: San Bernardino County, California
- Coordinates: 34°09′27″N 117°40′41″W
- Purpose: Flood and debris control
- Construction began: 1952; 74 years ago
- Opening date: 1956; 70 years ago
- Owners: U.S. Army Corps of Engineers, Los Angeles District

Dam and spillways
- Type of dam: Embankment
- Impounds: San Antonio Creek
- Height: 160 ft (49 m)
- Length: 3,850 ft (1,170 m)

Reservoir
- Total capacity: 11,880 acre⋅ft (14,650,000 m^{3})
- Catchment area: 27 mi^{2} (70 km^{2})

San Antonio Dam is an embankment flood control and debris dam on San Antonio Creek in San Bernardino County, California, about 5 miles (8.0 km) north of Ontario. The dam was authorized by the Flood Control Acts of 1936 and 1938 as part of a major program to provide flood protection in the Santa Ana River system. Construction began in April 1952 and finished in May 1956. The dam controls runoff from a rugged catchment area of 27 square miles (70 km^{2}) in the San Gabriel Mountains.

The dam was built by the Los Angeles District of the U.S. Army Corps of Engineers. The dam is 3,850 feet (1,170 m) long, 160 feet (49 m) high above the foundation, and 130 feet (40 m) above the riverbed. The main embankment contains 6,050,000 cubic yards (4,630,000 m^{3}) of material. The reservoir behind the dam is usually dry, but can fill with up to 11,880 acre-feet (14,650,000 m^{3}) of water after large flooding events. A concrete overflow spillway on the west side prevents overtopping and drains to the San Antonio and Chino Creek channels, which were lined with concrete between 1956 and 1960 to protect against such an event.

A project has been underway since 2012 to remediate seepage problems at the toe of the dam during heavy rainstorms. The dam is considered a high hazard structure.

== See also ==
- List of dams and reservoirs in California
