= City Creek =

City Creek may refer to any of the following:

- City Creek (California), a tributary of the Santa Ana River
- City Creek (South Dakota)
- City Creek (Utah), a tributary of the Jordan River (Utah)
- City Creek Center, shopping center development in Salt Lake City
