= Prado Reservoir =

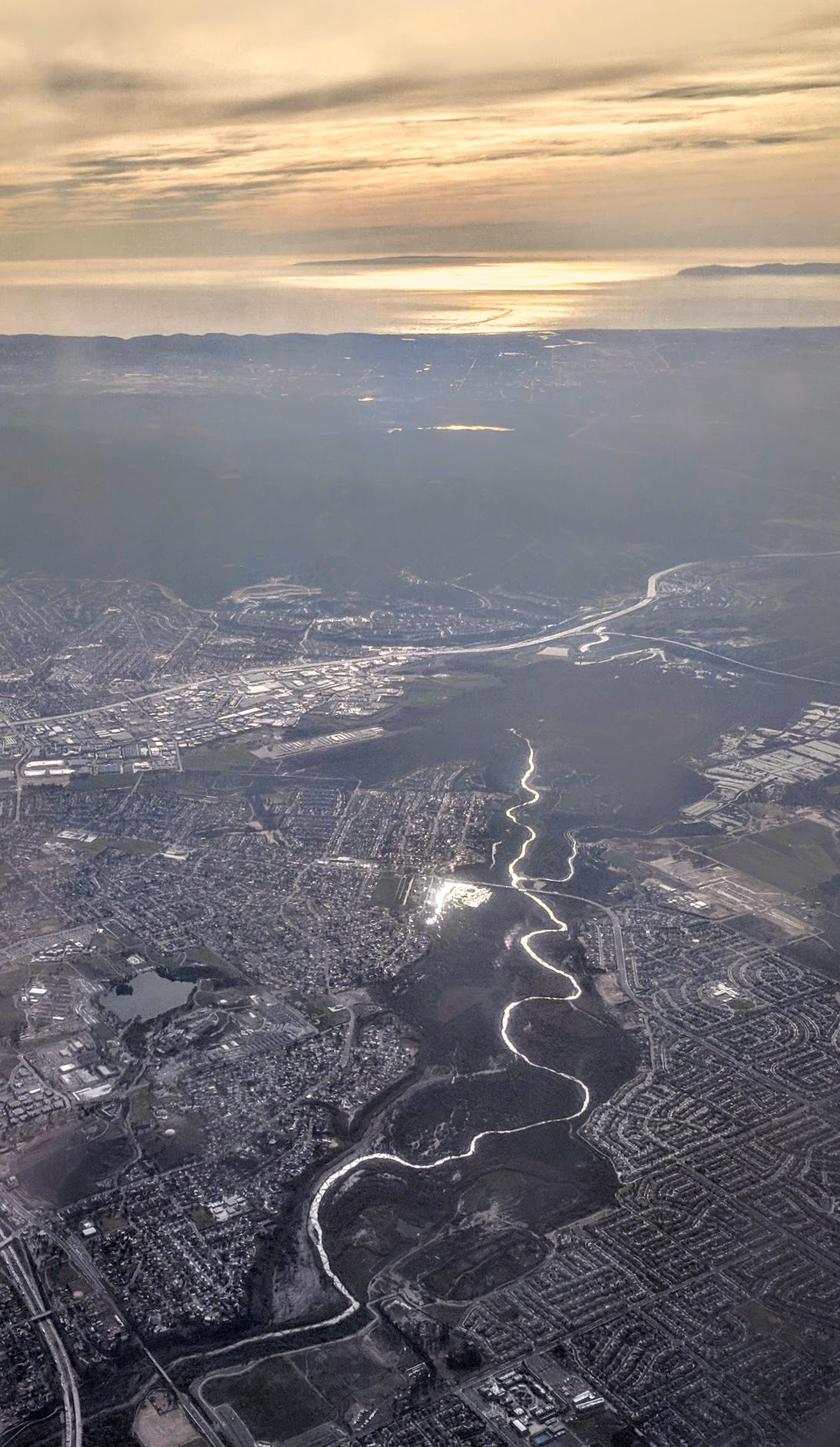
- Aerial view of the Santa Ana River, looking into the afternoon sun, where the river forms the boundary between Norco (left) and Eastvale (right) and flows into the Prado Flood Control Basin before highways 91 and 71. Santa Catalina Island in the distance.

- Location within California Location within the United States
- Location: Riverside / San Bernardino counties, California, US
- Coordinates: 33°54′09″N 117°37′44″W
- Type: Reservoir
- Primary inflows: Santa Ana River
- Primary outflows: Santa Ana River
- Catchment area: 2,255 sq mi (5,840 km^{2})
- Basin countries: United States
- Surface area: 6,600 acres (2,700 ha)
- Max. depth: 106 ft (32 m)
- Water volume: 362,000 acre⋅ft (447,000,000 m^{3})

Prado Reservoir is a reservoir in northwestern Riverside County, California formed by Prado Dam on the Santa Ana River. The usually empty reservoir has a capacity of 362,000 acre-feet (447,000,000 m^{3}). It is located in southwestern San Bernardino County, a couple of miles west of the city of Corona.

== Description ==
The dam is composed of rock-fill and has a height of 106 feet (32 m) above the original streambed. It was built on the upper end of the Lower Santa Ana River Canyon, where there is a natural constriction in the river. It is below 2,255 square miles (5,840 km^{2}) of the 2,450-square-mile (6,300 km^{2}) Santa Ana River watershed. The dam was built by the United States Army Corps of Engineers and was completed in 1941.

== Operation ==
Prado Dam and Prado Reservoir provide flood control and water conservation. Their operation is coordinated with the facilities upstream. Prado Reservoir is not a storage reservoir, so water is released as quickly as possible while still allowing for groundwater recharge. When the water level reaches the top of the buffer pool, whose size changes depending on time of year, water is released at the maximum rate that the downstream channel will safely allow. As of 2006, the capacity of the channel is 5,000 cubic feet (140 m^{3}) per second (140 m³/s), but channelization will eventually increase the capacity to 30,000 cubic feet (850 m^{3}) per second (850 m³/s). During flood season, the buffer pool only has a capacity of 8,437 acre-feet (10,407,000 m^{3}), while outside of flood season, the capacity increases to 25,760 acre-feet (31,770,000 m^{3}). Since this is 2.3 and 7.1 percent of the reservoir's total capacity, respectively, the reservoir is usually fairly empty.

== See also ==
- List of dams and reservoirs in California
- List of lakes in California
- List of largest reservoirs of California
