= City Creek (California) =

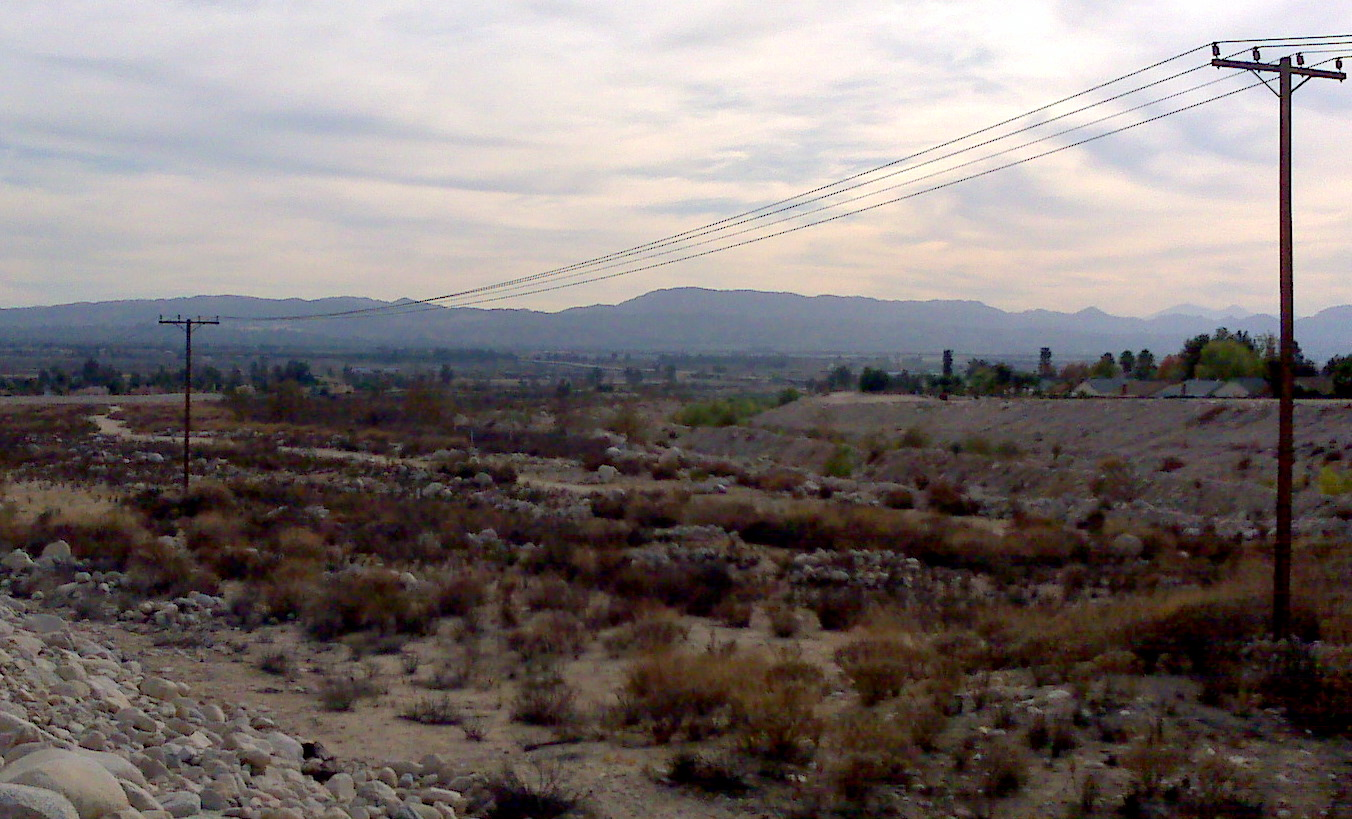
- The nearly-dry bed of City Creek near Highland, California

- Location of the mouth in California

Location
- Country: United States
- State: California
- Region: San Bernardino County
- City: Highland

Physical characteristics
- Source: Confluence of East and West Forks
  - coordinates: 34°17′33″N 117°18′22″W
  - elevation: 2,280 ft (690 m)
- Mouth: Santa Ana River
  - location: East of San Bernardino International Airport
  - coordinates: 34°09′55″N 117°21′43″W
  - elevation: 1,037 ft (316 m)
- Length: 7.5 mi (12.1 km), North-south
- Basin size: 19.6 sq mi (51 km^{2})
- Discharge
  - average: 10.1 cu ft/s (0.29 m^{3}/s)
  - minimum: 2.6 cu ft/s (0.074 m^{3}/s)
  - maximum: 7,000 cu ft/s (200 m^{3}/s)

Basin features
- River system: Santa Ana River
- Tributaries
  - left: East Fork City Creek
  - right: West Fork City Creek

City Creek is a 7.5-mile (12.1 km) tributary of the Santa Ana River in western San Bernardino County in the U.S. state of California. Its watershed drains about 19.6 square miles (51 km^{2}) on the southwest slopes of the San Bernardino Mountains. Although short, the creek stretches about 12 miles (19 km) to its farthest source.

It rises in two forks of similar length and size, West Fork City Creek and East Fork City Creek, in the San Bernardino National Forest. Both forks begin on the crest of the San Bernardino Mountains. The West Fork rises near Crest Summit south of the unincorporated community of Crest Park, at about 5,400 feet (1,600 m). It flows south then southeast and finally south again through multiple gorges, picking up several unnamed tributaries. The East Fork begins in a fan-shaped group of gulches south of Heaps Peak and Mount Sorenson, at about 6,000 feet (1,800 m). From there it runs south-southwest in a canyon past Fredalba, receiving Schenk Creek from the left near the mouth. The West Fork is about 4 miles (6.4 km) long; the East Fork stretches roughly 3 miles (4.8 km).

The two forks combine in a steep chasm just downstream of where the West Fork passes under a bridge of California State Route 330, also known as City Creek road. The main stem flows south in a thousand-foot-deep gorge between McKinley and Harrison Mountains, rapidly dropping to the plains near Highland, where most of its flow is diverted into canals for municipal and agricultural usage. Downstream of the diversions the creek fans out into alluvial deposits. Cook, Bledsoe and Elder Gulches as well as Plunge Creek all enter from the left as the creek flows along the east side of Highland in a wide flood control channel. It joins the Santa Ana River to the southeast of San Bernardino International Airport.

== See also ==
- City Creek (disambiguation)
- List of rivers of California
