= Seven Oaks Reservoir =

- Location within California Location within the United States
- Location: San Bernardino County, California
- Coordinates: 34°07′04″N 117°05′52″W
- Type: reservoir
- Primary inflows: Santa Ana River
- Primary outflows: Santa Ana River
- Basin countries: United States

Seven Oaks Reservoir is a reservoir on the Santa Ana River in San Bernardino County, California, about 8 miles (13 km) northeast of the city of Redlands. The reservoir is formed by Seven Oaks Dam, which was completed in 1999.

The United States Army Corps of Engineers built the zoned earth-and-rock-fill dam at the foot of the San Bernardino Mountains to protect against flooding in the eastern portion of the Greater Los Angeles Area. Its maximum height is 550 feet (170 m) above the pre-existing streambed and 650 feet (200 m) above the lowest portion of the foundation. The reservoir is medium-sized at 147,970 acre-feet (182,520,000 m^{3}), though it is a bit large for a reservoir whose sole purpose is flood control, which means that water is released as soon as safely possible, while still slow enough to allow water to seep into the streambed, recharging the groundwater aquifer. Also, releases are coordinated with Prado Dam, which is 40 miles (64 km) downstream.

== See also ==
- List of dams and reservoirs in California
- List of lakes in California
