= San Antonio Creek (San Bernardino County) =

River in the Pomona Valley, California

Location
- Country: United States
- State: California

Physical characteristics
- Source: San Gabriel Mountains
  - location: Mount San Antonio, Los Angeles County
  - coordinates: 34°08′11″N 117°41′22″W
  - elevation: 9,400 ft (2,900 m)
- Mouth: Chino Creek
  - location: Pomona Valley, near Chino, San Bernardino County
  - coordinates: 34°05′28″N 117°42′05″W
  - elevation: 1,148 ft (350 m)
- Length: 20.7 mi (33.3 km)
- Basin size: 36.6 mi^{2} (95 km^{2})
- Discharge
  - location: Chino, 0.4 mi (0.64 km) from the mouth
  - average: 10.7 cu ft/s (0.30 m^{3}/s)
  - minimum: 0 cu ft/s (0 m^{3}/s)
  - maximum: 3,420 cu ft/s (97 m^{3}/s)

San Antonio Creek is a major stream in Los Angeles County and San Bernardino County, California, draining southwards from Mount San Antonio in the San Gabriel Mountains into Chino Creek, a tributary of the Santa Ana River. Upon leaving San Antonio Canyon and entering the broad alluvial plain of the Pomona Valley, it is known as the San Antonio Wash or the San Antonio Creek Channel, the former referring to the creek's seasonal dry nature below the mouth of San Antonio Canyon.

== Geography ==
The creek is 20.7 miles (33.3 km) long and has a drainage basin of about 37 square miles (96 km^{2}).

=== Course ===
San Antonio Creek rises on the southeast flank of Mount San Antonio (Mount Baldy), the highest peak in the San Gabriel Mountains range. The stream flows southwest through San Antonio Canyon and past Mount Baldy Village, then south, winding through the Angeles National Forest. At the end of the canyon it reaches the San Antonio Dam, but after passing through the dam, the stream is usually dry. It flows south through a concrete flood control channel, passing through the several cities of the Pomona Valley, including Claremont, Montclair, and Chino. The creek joins Chino Creek in northwestern Chino, 9 miles (14 km) upstream from the larger stream's mouth at the Santa Ana River.

== History ==
The creek's upper canyon was the site of some of the heaviest gold mining activity in the San Gabriels during the mid-19th century. When the gold deposits petered out, the streambanks played host to various mountain resort camps beginning in the early 20th century. Also around this time, canals were built from the mouth of San Antonio Canyon to irrigate farms in the creek's wide floodplain.

The Los Angeles Flood of 1938 destroyed much of the early development along the creek. The San Antonio Dam was built between 1952 and 1956 by the U.S. Army Corps of Engineers to provide flood control. In recent years, the lower watershed has become much more urbanized, and the headwaters region is mainly used for recreation, summer hiking and camping, and winter skiing at the Mount Baldy Ski Lifts area.

== See also ==
- Tributaries of the Santa Ana River
- List of rivers of California
- Pomona Valley topics
