= Chino Valley, California =

Valley in California, United States

Coordinates: 34.7597°N 112.4172°W

The Chino Valley is a sub−valley section of the large Pomona Valley, located in southwestern San Bernardino County, California.

== Geography ==
The cities of Chino Hills and Chino comprise the Chino Valley. The two cities have a combined population of approximately 175,000, and are part of the Inland Empire region.

The Chino Valley is east of the low Chino Hills mountain range. Chino Creek flows through the western side of the valley.

== Education ==
- Chino Valley Unified School District
- Chaffey College

== Major thoroughfares ==
- Chino Valley Freeway (State Route 71)
- Pomona Freeway (State Route 60)
- California State Route 142 — Chino Hills Parkway & Carbon Canyon Road, to Lambert Road in Brea.
- Grand Avenue
- Edison Avenue
- Ramona Avenue
- Peyton Drive
- Central Avenue
- Soquel Canyon Parkway
- Butterfield Ranch Road
- Riverside Drive
- Chino Avenue

== See also ==
- Chino Hills State Park
