= City Creek (South Dakota) =

Stream in South Dakota, U.S.

Coordinates: 44°22′35″N 103°43′58″W

City Creek is a stream in the U.S. state of South Dakota.

City Creek flows past the City of Deadwood, from which it derives its name.

== See also ==
- List of rivers of South Dakota
