= Seven Oaks Dam =

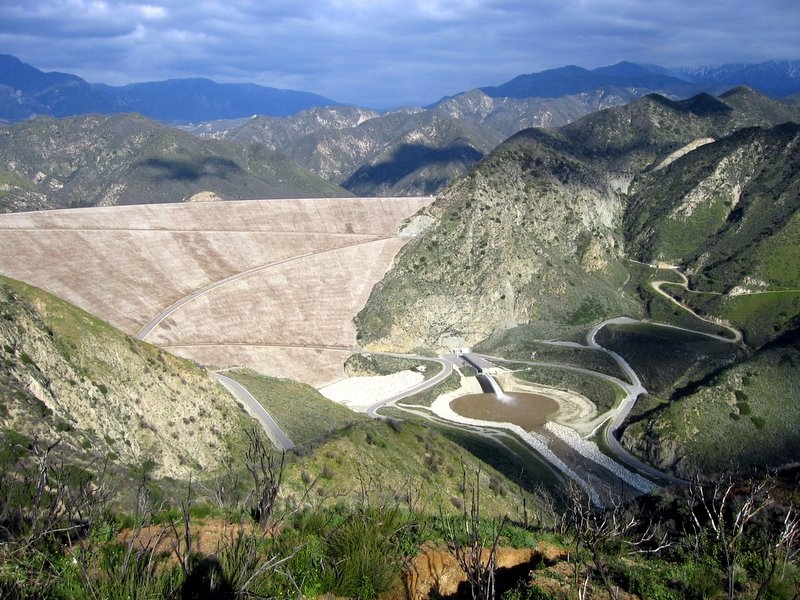
- Interactive map of Seven Oaks Dam
- Country: United States
- Location: San Bernardino National Forest, San Bernardino County, near Mentone, California
- Coordinates: 34°07′02″N 117°06′00″W
- Construction began: 1993; 33 years ago
- Opening date: 2000; 26 years ago
- Construction cost: $450 million
- Owners: Orange County Flood Control District, San Bernardino County Flood Control District

Dam and spillways
- Type of dam: Embankment
- Impounds: Santa Ana River
- Height: 550 ft (170 m)
- Length: 2,980 ft (910 m)

Reservoir
- Creates: Seven Oaks Reservoir
- Total capacity: 145,600 acre⋅ft (0.1796 km^{3})
- Catchment area: 176 mi^{2} (460 km^{2})
- Surface area: 780 acres (320 ha) (max)
- Normal elevation: 2,604.4 ft (793.8 m) (max)

Seven Oaks Dam is a 550-foot (170 m) high earth and rock fill embankment dam across the Santa Ana River in the San Bernardino Mountains, about 4 miles (6.4 km) northeast of Redlands in San Bernardino County, southern California. It impounds Seven Oaks Reservoir in the San Bernardino National Forest.

The dam was proposed in response to major floods in the mid–20th century, and was constructed between 1993 and 2000. Seven Oaks is a dry dam that serves mainly for flood protection to Orange, Riverside and San Bernardino Counties, although it also used to impound water for groundwater recharge. One of the largest embankment dams in the United States, the dam was built under contract from the U.S. Army Corps of Engineers (USACE) by Odebrecht Corporation of California, a subsidiary of the Brazilian firm Contructora Norberto Odebrecht. The dam is now owned and operated by local flood control districts.

== History ==
The USACE began an ambitious effort to improve levees and dams on the Santa Ana River system known as the Santa Ana River Mainstem Project. Among the works proposed under the project were an expansion of the massive Prado Dam, which despite filling to capacity did not fully prevent heavy flooding damages in Orange County, and the construction of the $530 million "Mentone Dam" across the Santa Ana north of Mentone in San Bernardino County. However, the Mentone Dam site was controversial because it would affect groundwater recharge, was aesthetically unpleasing and lay on unstable sediment deposits directly above the San Andreas Fault. In response to public opposition, the USACE replaced the Mentone proposal with the $304 million Upper Santa Ana River Dam, later to be called Seven Oaks Dam, in a bedrock canyon one mile (1.6 km) upstream in the southern San Bernardino Mountains.

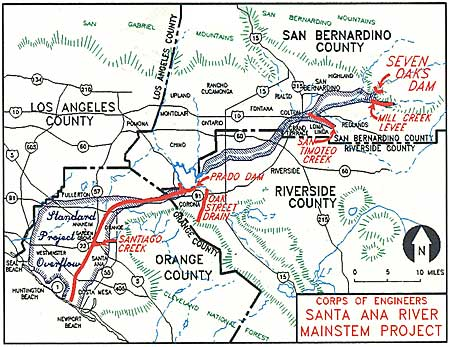
USACE map showing major works of the Santa Ana River Mainstem Project

The contract for Seven Oaks Dam was awarded in 1994 and construction work began in May. A system of conveyor belts totaling 3.5 miles (5.6 km), with a capacity of 3,400 short tons (3,080 t) per hour, was built to transport materials to the dam site. Fill used in the embankment was excavated from the Santa Ana River canyon directly below the dam, the alluvial fan of the river north of Mentone, and a cut in a ridge directly southeast of the dam that now serves as the dam's spillway. The dam was built in ten alternating zones of dirt, rock and clay that ultimately totaled 38,000,000 cubic yards (29,000,000 m^{3}). When completed and dedicated in January 2000, the Seven Oaks Dam was the 12th highest dam in the world and was one of the last major dams built in the United States. At $450 million, the final cost of the dam significantly exceeded the USACE's projected cost. The federal government shouldered 70.47% of the total cost, while Orange County paid 27.09%, San Bernardino County 1.71%, and Riverside County 0.73%.

== Design and operations ==
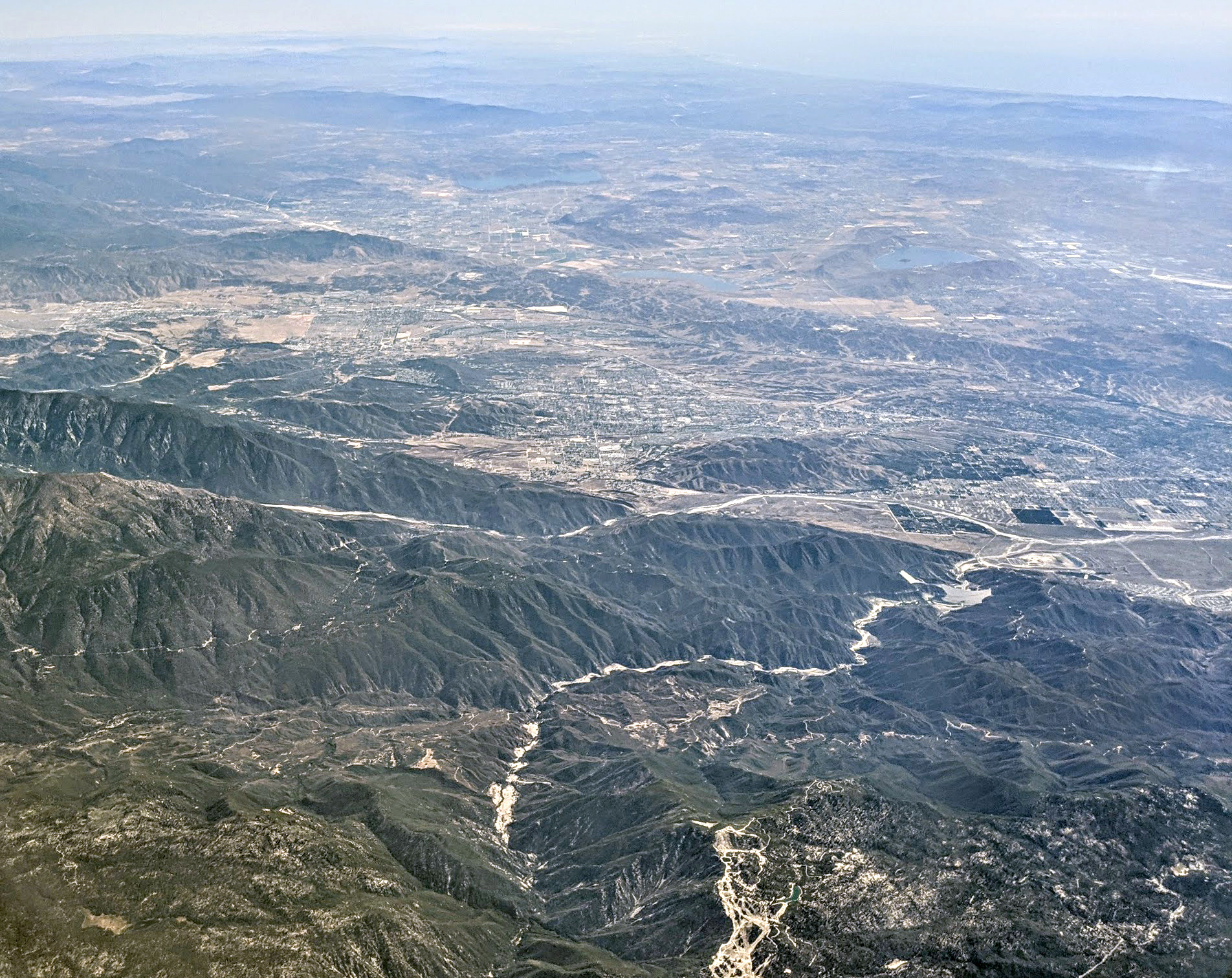
Aerial view of the Santa Ana River and the dam

Seven Oaks Dam is a 2,980-foot (910 m) long arched embankment structure standing 550 feet (170 m) high above the Santa Ana River and 650 feet (200 m) above its deepest foundations. The dam is 40 feet (12 m) wide at the crest and over 2,200 feet (670 m) wide at the base. Situated close to the San Andreas Fault, Seven Oaks is designed to withstand an 8.0 M_{L} earthquake. The reservoir has a gross storage capacity of 145,600 acre-feet (0.1796 km^{3}), with 113,600 acre-feet (0.1401 km^{3}) reserved for flood control and the remainder for sediment accumulation. At full pool, the reservoir lies at an elevation of 2,604.4 feet (793.8 m) and has an area of 780 acres (320 ha). Water releases are controlled by a 1,623-foot (495 m) long tunnel outlet that runs through the base of the structure, and a 500-foot (150 m) wide ungated overflow spillway located just southeast of the dam. The dam controls runoff from an area of 176 square miles (460 km^{2}) or 209 square miles (540 km^{2}) including the drainage area of Baldwin Lake, which overflows into the Santa Ana River system during periods of heavy runoff.

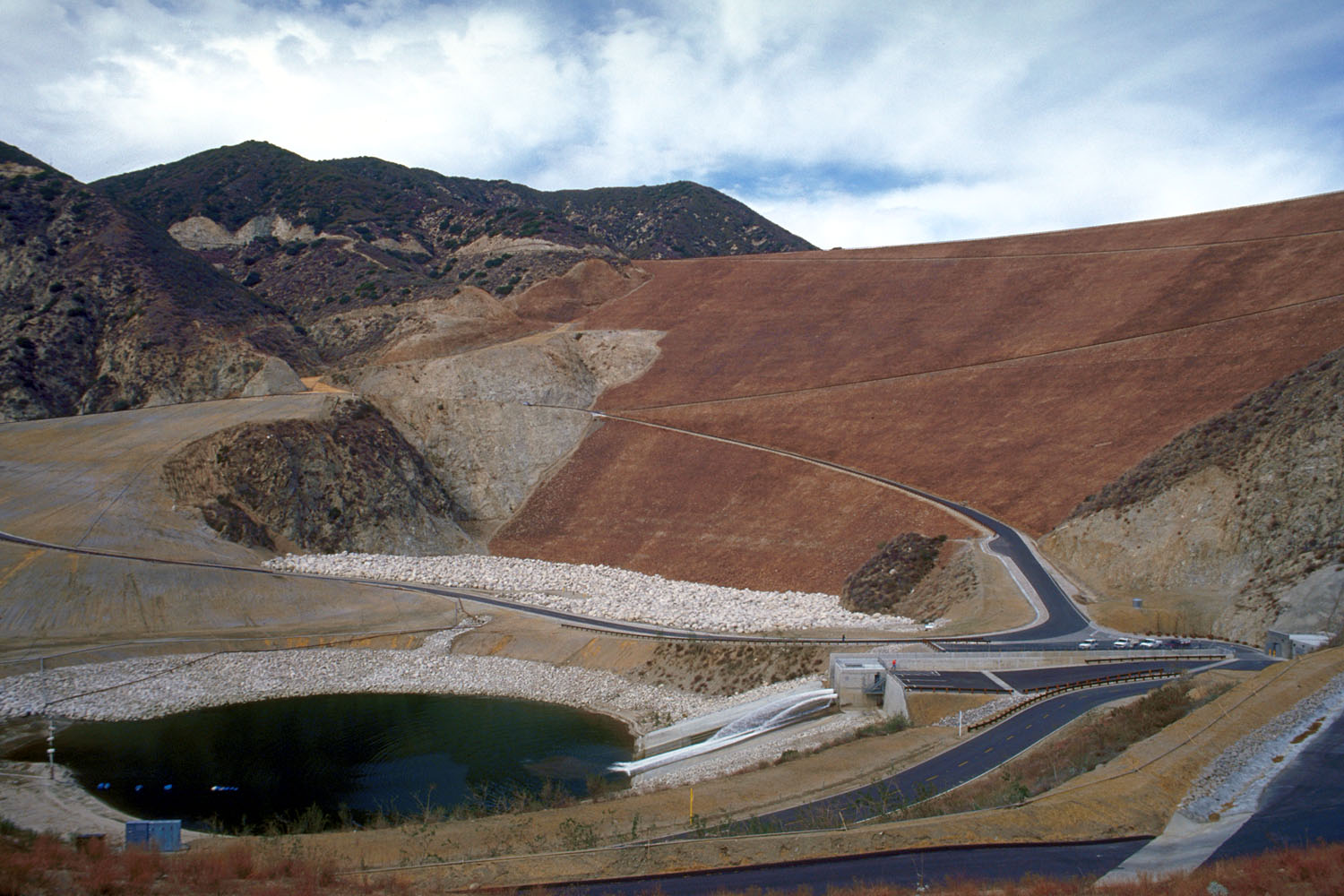
Seven Oaks Dam viewed from the south

In tandem with Prado Dam, Seven Oaks prevents about $140 million of flood–related damages each year in Orange, Riverside and San Bernardino Counties and provides flood protection to more than two million people. During flood events, Seven Oaks Dam will store runoff as long as the reservoir of Prado Dam is rising, then release the captured water as quickly as downstream channel conditions allow. Seven Oaks is designed to completely contain a "Reservoir Design Flood" of 85,000 cubic feet per second (2,400 m^{3}/s), corresponding to a 350-year flood event, reducing it to a peak outflow of 7,000 cubic feet per second (200 m^{3}/s). The dam is capable of withstanding an inflow of up to 180,000 cubic feet per second (5,100 m^{3}/s), or the "Probable Maximum Flood". In addition, controlled releases from the dam allow about 10,000 acre-feet (0.012 km^{3}) of additional groundwater recharge in the upper Santa Ana River basin each year. Captured floodwater from the Seven Oaks Dam benefits local water districts, as river water costs only a fraction of water imported through the State Water Project, which supplies most agricultural and municipal needs in the area.

Since its construction, Seven Oaks Dam has not yet been filled to capacity. The highest lake level on record was about 43,000 acre-feet (0.053 km^{3}), or less than a third of capacity, on March 8, 2005. The high water presented an opportunity to test large water releases through the dam's outlet works, but the trial had to be cancelled because the high flows destroyed sections of the concrete tunnel lining. The tunnel was repaired and later tested successfully in 2011.

== Environmental impacts ==
In March 1999, as the dam neared completion, environmental groups filed a lawsuit against the USACE because construction activity at the Seven Oaks site had affected the habitats of two endangered plants, the Santa Ana River woolly star and slender-horned spineflower, and the endangered San Bernardino kangaroo rat. The USACE responded by purchasing 1,547 acres (626 ha) of land adjoining the dam and reservoir to use in conservation of these species. The Seven Oaks Dam has also damaged the habitat of native fish species including the Santa Ana sucker, which is endemic to a handful of river systems of Southern California.

== See also ==
- Great Flood of 1862
- List of reservoirs and dams in California
- List of the tallest dams in the United States
- Los Angeles Flood of 1938

== Works cited ==
- Blatt, Harvey (2005). America's environmental report card: are we making the grade?. MIT Press. ISBN 0-262-02572-8.
