= Santa Ana River =

River in California, United States

Santa Ana River Rio de los Temblores, Rio de Santa Anna
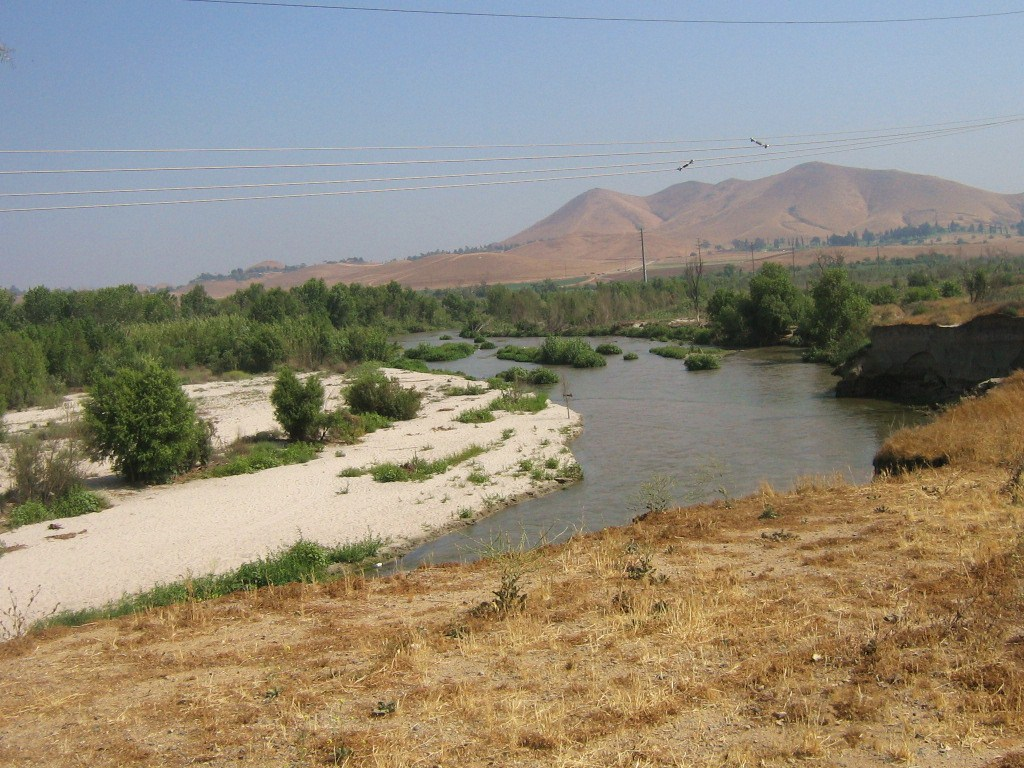
- The Santa Ana River as seen from a small bluff overlooking the water. This part of the river serves as the border between the cities of Eastvale and Norco

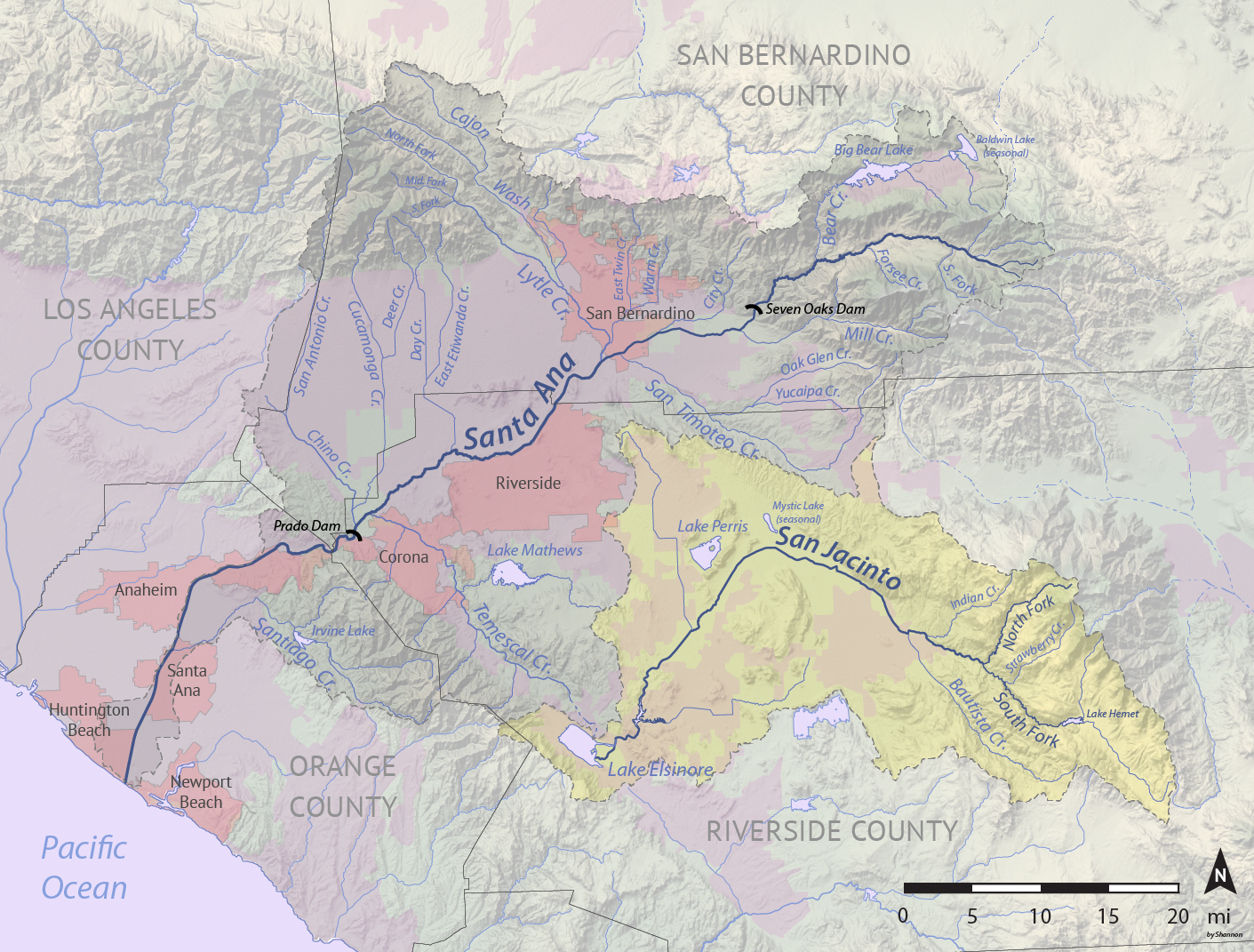
- Map of the Santa Ana River drainage basin

Location
- Country: United States
- State: California
- Counties: San Bernardino, Riverside, Orange
- Cities: San Bernardino, Riverside, Anaheim, Santa Ana

Physical characteristics
- Source: Coon Creek
  - coordinates: 34°09′14″N 116°41′20″W
  - elevation: 8,650 ft (2,640 m)
- 2nd source: Heart Bar Creek
  - coordinates: 34°08′06″N 116°44′23″W
  - elevation: 7,900 ft (2,400 m)
- Source confluence: San Bernardino Mountains
  - location: Santa Ana Canyon, San Bernardino County
  - coordinates: 34°09′00″N 116°46′18″W
  - elevation: 6,991 ft (2,131 m)
- Mouth: Pacific Ocean
  - location: Huntington Beach, Orange County
  - coordinates: 33°37′41″N 117°57′31″W
  - elevation: 0 ft (0 m)
- Length: 96 mi (154 km), Northeast-Southwest
- Basin size: 2,650 mi^{2} (6,900 km^{2})
- Discharge
  - location: Below Prado Dam, near Corona
  - average: 224 cu ft/s (6.3 m^{3}/s)
  - minimum: 0 cu ft/s (0 m^{3}/s)
  - maximum: 317,000 cu ft/s (9,000 m^{3}/s)

Basin features
- Tributaries
  - left: Mill Creek, San Timoteo Creek, Temescal Creek/ San Jacinto River, Santiago Creek
  - right: Bear Creek, City Creek, Lytle Creek, Chino Creek

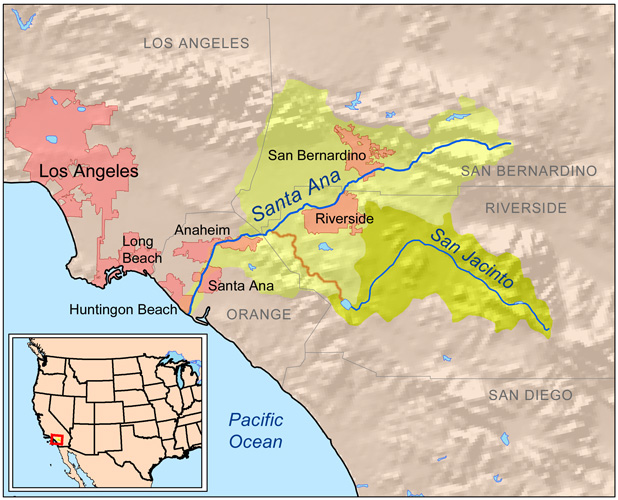
Map Santa Ana River

The Santa Ana River is the largest river entirely within Southern California in the United States. It rises in the San Bernardino Mountains and flows for most of its length through San Bernardino and Riverside counties, before cutting through the northern Santa Ana Mountains via Santa Ana Canyon and flowing southwest through urban Orange County to drain into the Pacific Ocean. The Santa Ana River is 96 miles (154 km) long, and its drainage basin is 2,650 square miles (6,900 km^{2}) in size.

The Santa Ana drainage basin has a diversity of terrain, ranging from high peaks of inland mountains in the north and east, to the hot, dry interior and semidesert basins of the Inland Empire, to the flat coastal plain of Orange County. Although it includes areas of alpine and highland forest, the majority of the watershed consists of arid desert and chaparral environments. Due to low regional rainfall, the river carries only a small flow except during the brief winter season, when it is prone to massive flash floods. The San Jacinto River, which drains the southern half of the watershed, rarely reaches the Santa Ana except in extremely wet years. A wide variety of animal and plant communities depend on the riparian zones and remnant wetlands along the Santa Ana River.

Humans have lived on the Santa Ana River for at least 9,000 years. The villages of Lupukngna, Genga, Pajbenga, Totpavit, and Hutuknga were located along the river. The river was first seen by Europeans in 1769, when it received its name from members of the Spanish Portola expedition. Because it was one of the only reliable sources of water in a wide region, many large ranchos developed along the river and one of its major tributaries, Santiago Creek. After the area became part of the United States, the economy transitioned to agriculture, before urbanizing in the 20th century. Many cities established during this time—including Santa Ana, Riverside, and Anaheim—derived their names from the river. In order to protect urban areas from the river's flood threat, major channelization and damming projects were undertaken, resulting in the loss of much of the natural river channel.

== Course ==
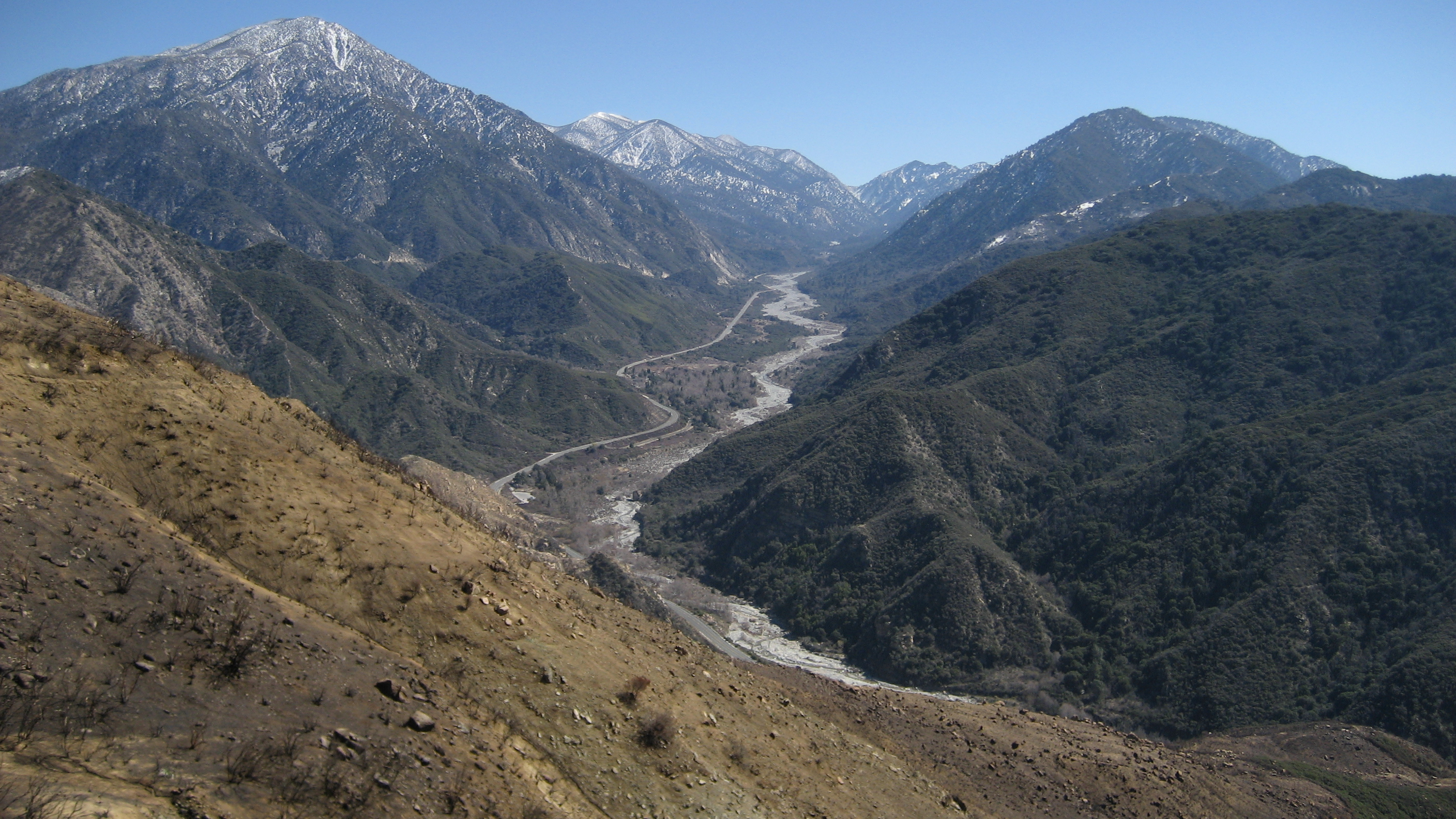
Mill Creek (pictured) is one of the main headwaters tributaries of the Santa Ana River.

The Santa Ana River rises in the southern San Bernardino Mountains, at the confluence of two tiny streams, Heart Bar Creek and Coon Creek, at an elevation of 6,991 feet (2,131 m). Its highest sources are Dollar Lake, at 9,288 feet (2,831 m), and Dry Lake, at 9,068 feet (2,764 m), both on the northern flank of San Gorgonio Mountain, at the headwaters of the South Fork Santa Ana River. The river flows west through a wide, deep, and heavily forested mountain valley. About 18 miles (29 km) from its headwaters, it receives its first major tributary, Bear Creek, which enters from the north. Bear Creek receives its water from Big Bear Lake, a popular recreational mountain lake. The river turns south, passing through the Seven Oaks Dam, and reaches the arid Inland Empire lowland covering large parts of San Bernardino County and Riverside County. It receives Mill Creek from the south and passes to the south of San Bernardino, then receives City Creek from the north and San Timoteo Creek from the south. Due to water diversions for groundwater recharge, the river bed is usually dry in this stretch between Mill Creek and the outlet of the Veolia water treatment plant north of Riverside, which restores a year-round flow. From there to Prado Dam, the river supports a riparian zone with considerable greenery.

Not far below the confluence with San Timoteo Creek, Lytle Creek enters from the north. Lytle Creek is one of the largest tributaries of the Santa Ana River, rising from three forks in the San Gabriel Mountains and flowing southeast, before emptying into the Santa Ana River as Lytle Creek Wash. From there, the river turns southwest, and after passing through western Riverside, it discharges into the normally dry flood control reservoir formed by Prado Dam. Two major tributaries of the river join in the reservoir area: Chino Creek from the north, and Temescal Creek from the south. Temescal Creek drains the largest area of all the tributaries, because it provides the outflow from Lake Elsinore, into which the San Jacinto River flows. It is also one of the longest, at 32 miles (51 km) in length. Except during the wettest years when Lake Elsinore fills high enough to overflow, Temescal Creek contributes little to no water into the Santa Ana River.

Below Prado Dam, the Santa Ana River crosses into Orange County, and cuts between the Santa Ana Mountains and Chino Hills via the narrow Santa Ana Canyon. The river roughly bisects the county as it flows southwest towards the ocean. In Anaheim, the entire flow of the river (except during wet seasons) is diverted into spreading grounds for groundwater recharge of the north Orange County aquifer, providing about half of the county's municipal water supply. Downstream of there, the river is mostly confined to a concrete channel, serving only for flood control and urban runoff drainage, and is usually dry or a small trickle. At Orange, it receives Santiago Creek from the east before entering Santa Ana. After crossing under Interstate 5, it passes through the River View Golf Course, one of its few non-concreted sections within Orange County, and then becomes a concrete channel again through most of Santa Ana and Fountain Valley to a point below the 405 Freeway, where the river bed becomes natural (though the banks remain concrete). The mouth of the river is located in a small tidal lagoon between Huntington State Beach in Huntington Beach and Newport Beach.

== Watershed ==
The Santa Ana River drains the largest watershed of California's South Coast region, covering 2,650 square miles (6,900 km^{2}) in parts of San Bernardino, Riverside, Orange, and Los Angeles Counties. Although the river does not pass through Los Angeles County, some of its tributaries, including San Antonio Creek, extend into it. The watershed consists mainly of high mountain ranges that surround and divide large, dry alluvial valleys. The San Gabriel, San Bernardino, and San Jacinto Mountains encircle the arid Inland Empire lowland on the north and east. The Santa Ana Mountains and Chino Hills divide the Inland Empire from the Orange County coastal plain; the Santa Ana Canyon is the only natural break in the range between the two lowlands. The southern part of the watershed, drained by the San Jacinto River into Lake Elsinore and via Temescal Creek into the Santa Ana River, constitutes some 45% of the total area and extend its boundaries as far south as the Colorado Desert at Anza-Borrego Desert State Park. The river has over 50 named tributaries, most of which are intermittent streams.

As of 2000, about 4.8 million people lived in the Santa Ana River watershed. Most of the population is concentrated close to the river in urban centers such as San Bernardino, Riverside, Anaheim, and Santa Ana. The Inland Empire still has large areas dedicated to agriculture and ranching, although it is rapidly urbanizing. In Orange County, nearly all the valley lands are urbanized. Some major bodies of water in the watershed include Irvine Lake, Lake Mathews, Lake Perris, Diamond Valley Lake, Lake Skinner, and Big Bear Lake. All of these are water supply reservoirs constructed by county or state water agencies, and with the exception of Big Bear, much of the water is imported from other parts of California due to the arid local climate. Diamond Valley Lake, with a storage capacity of 800,000 acre-feet (0.99 km^{3}), is the largest and most recently constructed. Lake Elsinore is the only major natural lake in the watershed.

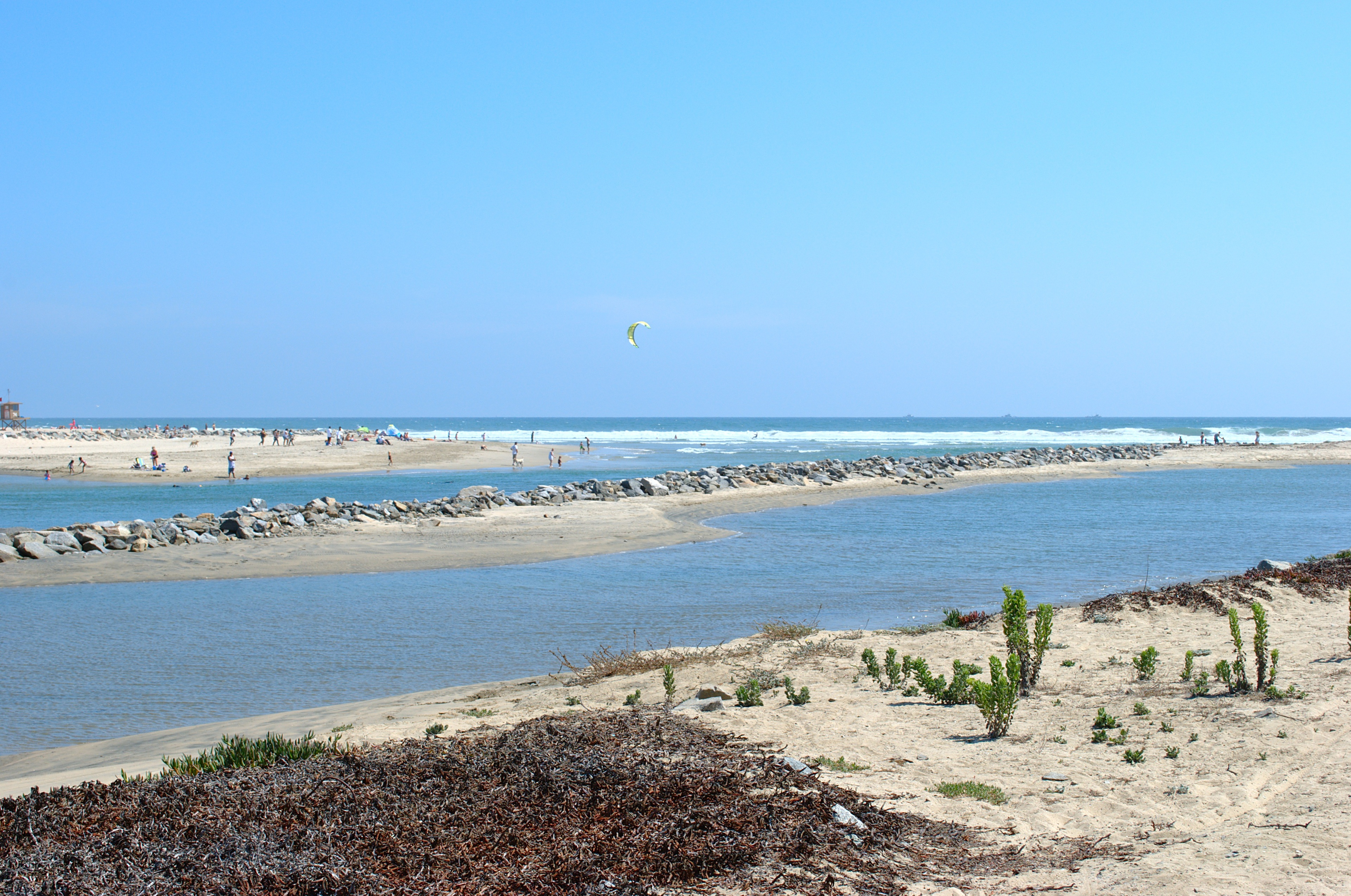
The channeled mouth of the Santa Ana River between Huntington Beach and Newport Beach

The Santa Ana River watershed shares boundaries with many adjacent river basins. In the northwest is the San Gabriel River, which empties into the Pacific at Long Beach. In Orange County, the San Diego Creek, Aliso Creek, and San Juan Creek watersheds border the Santa Ana watershed on the south. Further south, in San Diego County, the watershed is bordered by those of San Mateo Creek, the Santa Margarita River, and the San Luis Rey River. On the east, the watershed shares borders with those of the Whitewater River and the Coachella Valley, flowing into the Salton Sea, and on the north with the Mojave River, which flows into the endorheic basin of the Mojave Desert.

In Orange County, the river flows across a vast, gently sloping alluvial fan created from its own sediments; therefore, its drainage basin is extremely narrow because the surrounding land slopes away from the river bed. In its natural state, the river would frequently change course into one of many intermittent channels that fan out across the plain. Today, these auxiliary river beds have been artificially disconnected from the Santa Ana River and converted into flood control channels, including the Talbert and Huntington Beach channels, which empty into the Pacific Ocean very near the mouth of the Santa Ana River. The combined Talbert-Huntington Beach watershed drains 21.4 square miles (55 km^{2}) of mostly suburbanized land. The river originally had many different outlets to the Pacific, one of which even extended as far north as the San Gabriel River. The original mouth of the river was located at Newport Bay, which drained into the Pacific Ocean at what is today the entrance to Newport Harbor. Based on a U.S. Coastal Survey from 1878, Newport Bay was predominantly a river estuary with few open channels. The river flowed into the bay, bringing with it heavy silt and making boating difficult. To eventually create Newport Harbor, sand deposited by the Santa Ana River had to be constantly dredged away. In 1920, the Bitter Point Dam was built to divert the river away from the bay and on its current course to the ocean at Huntington Beach. Stone jetties were built to form the new river mouth. All of the islands in Newport Harbor are the product of dredging and man-made forming from the sands and silt deposited over time by the Santa Ana River.

== Geology ==
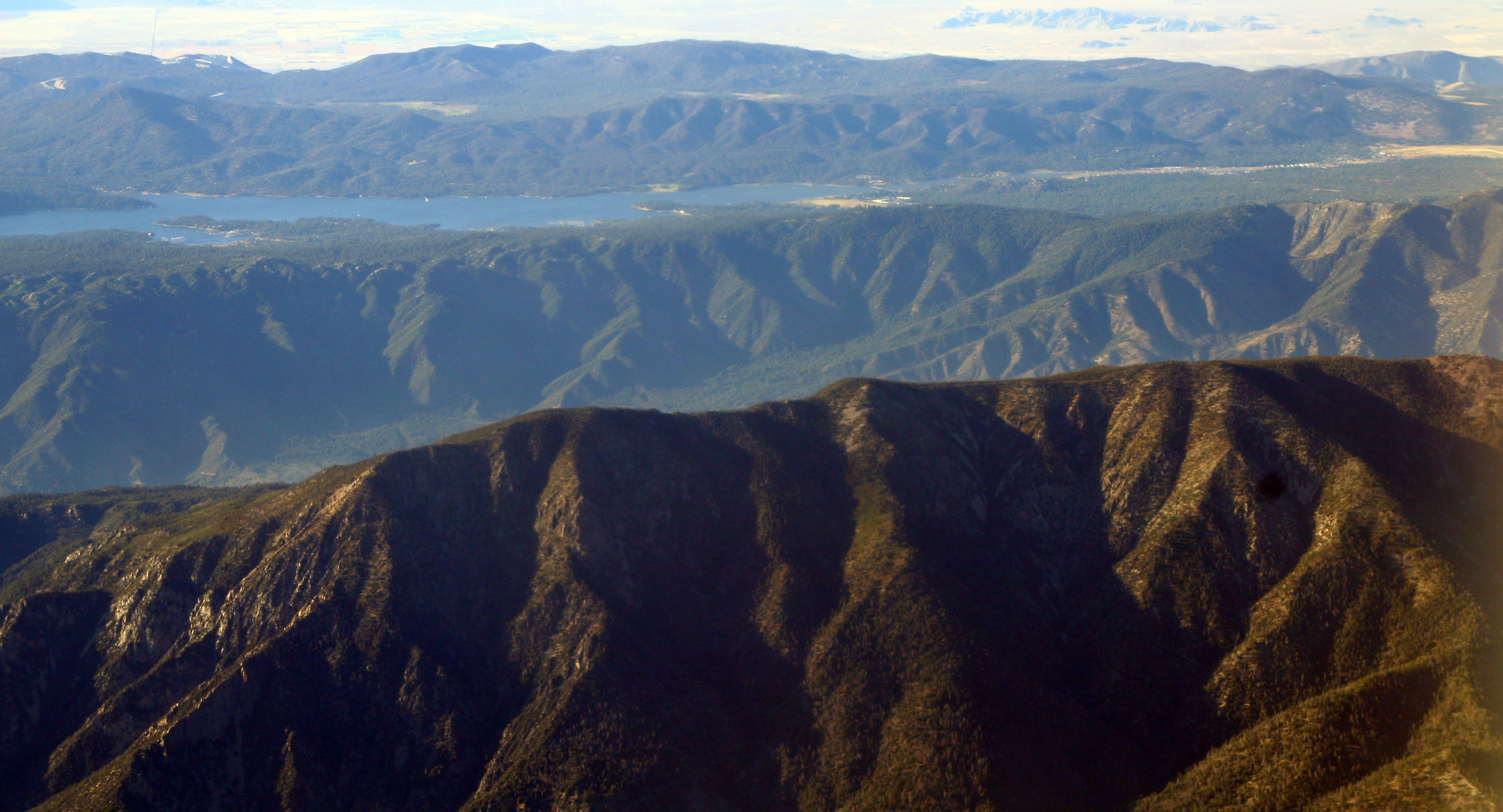
The Transverse Ranges were formed by uplift along the San Andreas Fault. Santa Ana Canyon is between the first and second ridges and Big Bear Lake is in the background.

Ancient igneous, metamorphic, and sedimentary rock underlie and form the geologic base of the Santa Ana River watershed. Most of the strata in the flat valleys and basins of the watershed are underlain by thousands of feet of sediment deposited by shallow seas that covered parts of Southern California in ancient times. Most of the mountains in and around the basin consist of granite batholiths about 75 million years old. However, above elevations of 8,000 to 9,000 feet (2,400 to 2,700 m), ancient metamorphic rock up to 1.7 billion years old is exposed. This rock originally formed at the bottom of the ancestral Pacific Ocean and was uplifted to the highest peaks of the mountains by tectonic action. Even during the ice ages, Southern California mountains were not subjected to extensive glaciation, so the rock has remained for tens of millions of years without significant erosion.

Diverse and complex faulting and geologic instability have shaped the Santa Ana River watershed. The San Andreas Fault runs across the northern section of the watershed and is responsible for the formation of the San Bernardino and San Gabriel Mountains, part of the Transverse Ranges of Southern California. The Elsinore–Whittier Fault Zone crosses the Santa Ana River further downstream, near the Orange/Riverside County line. Tectonic action along this fault created the Santa Ana Mountains, Puente Hills, East Orange Hills, Chino Hills, Loma Ridge, and the other mountain ranges and ridges that run northwest–southeast across the lower section of the watershed—the coastal Peninsular Ranges. While the Transverse Ranges rise above 10,000 feet (3,000 m) in many places, the highest peaks of the Peninsular Ranges reach less than half that elevation.

The cutting of Santa Ana Canyon across the Peninsular Ranges is attributed to the wetter Southern California climate during the Wisconsinian Glaciation and earlier ice ages, during which rivers in Southern California were substantially bigger in volume. The Santa Ana River, which existed prior to the creation of the Peninsular Ranges, maintained its course as an antecedent stream due to its increased erosive power. The canyon was eroded through bedrock that today divides the groundwater basins of the Inland Empire and the coastal plain. Because groundwater in the watershed generally flows from east to west, it is forced to the surface at the bedrock "sill" of Santa Ana Canyon, resulting in a perennial stream that, prior to development, flowed freely across the coastal plain to the Pacific. During this period, the Santa Ana changed course multiple times, eroding now-dry wind gaps in the Peninsular Range and the coastal mesas around Huntington Beach and Newport Beach.

== Ecology ==
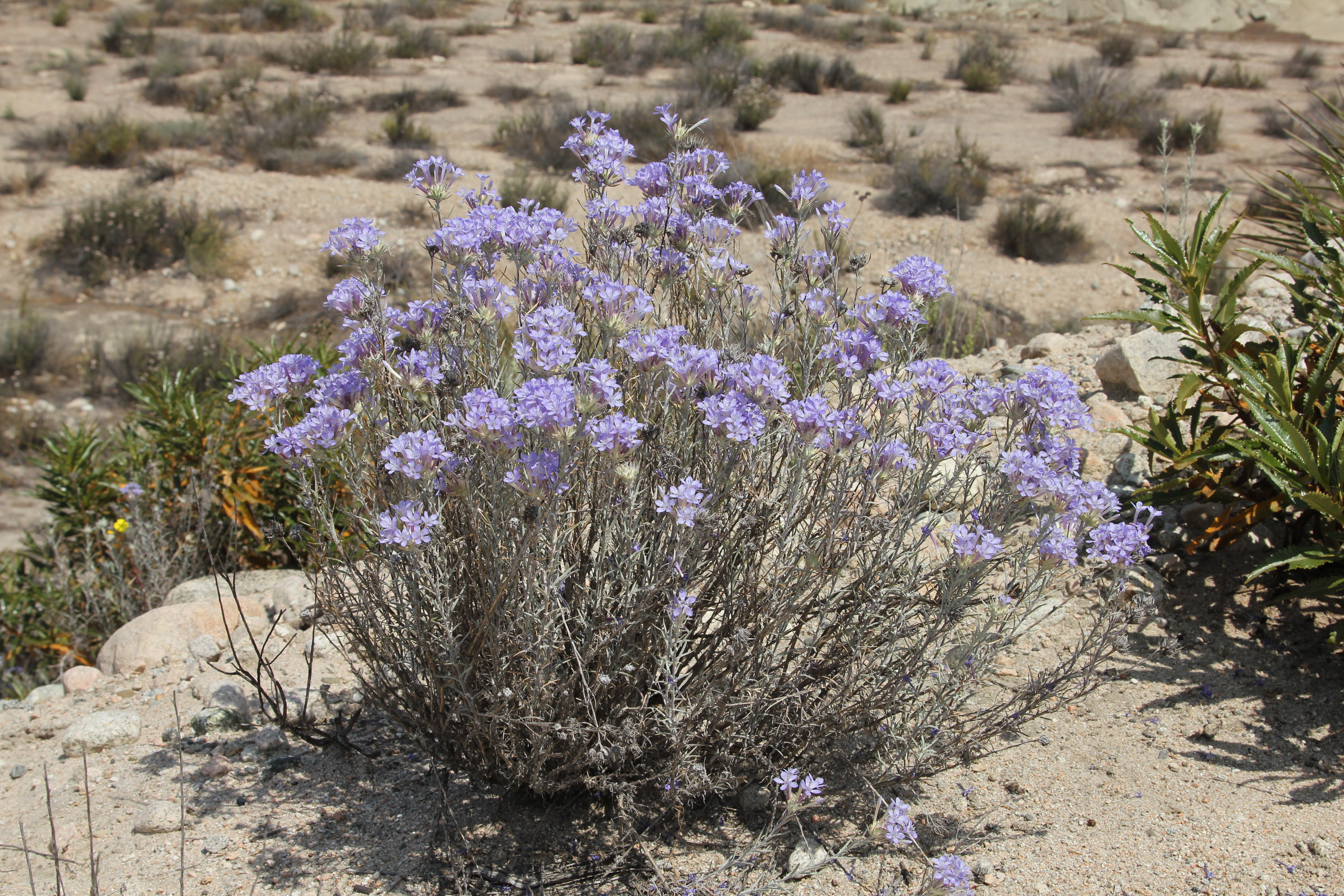
Santa Ana River woolly-star (Eriastrum densifolium ssp. sanctorum) is endemic to the Santa Ana River drainage in southern California. It is listed as endangered under the California Endangered Species Act (CESA) and Federal Endangered Species Act, killing or possessing the plant is prohibited.

Hundreds of species of animals and plants characterize the Santa Ana River's diversity of climates and vegetation zones. There are over ten of these vegetation zones in the watershed—including the sparsely vegetated alpine and subalpine zones in the mountains, mid-elevation forests of pine, lodgepole, and oak, chaparral, coastal sage scrub, the increasingly rare riparian forest, and marshes along the river bed, lined with trees and rushes, and the thinly vegetated coastal areas virtually flush with sea level. The watershed supports up to 200 bird species, 50 mammal species, 13 reptile species, 7 amphibian species, and 15 fish species, including steelhead trout.

The largest portion of the watershed, the Inland Empire portion, is dominated by a hot, dry desert climate that supports sparse wildlife, while the climate and vegetation of the San Jacinto River and Temescal Creek watershed is similar to that of the southern Central Valley. Downstream of the desert was once the coastal sage scrub and dry grassland community of the Orange County coastal plain, but that region has been almost entirely lost to urbanization. Rimming the arid portions of the watershed are the chaparral zones, consisting of sclerophyllous, thick, low bushes and small trees. The chaparral generally is found between elevations of 1,000 and 6,500 feet (300 and 1,980 m), and occurs mainly closer to the coast on the windward side of the Peninsular Ranges. The scrub oak is one of the most common plants in chaparral regions, forming a dense groundcover that makes it difficult for humans and large animals such as mountain lions, coyotes, and bobcats to traverse. Chaparral growth is determined by wildfires and droughts, and it depends on the semi-arid climate of the region.

Perennial and seasonal streams often are lined with live oak and sycamore, which transition into the riparian zones of the main stem Santa Ana River. The largest unbroken riparian corridor is the 20-mile (32 km) stretch between Riverside and Prado Dam, where the river has been largely left in its natural state despite pollution from urban runoff. In addition, the flood control basin behind Prado Dam contains 6,600 acres (2,700 ha) of seasonal wetlands. The Santa Ana sucker, a small bottom-dwelling fish, was once found along most of the Santa Ana River, but is now rarely seen. Near the mouth, the river was once abundant in salt marshes, which stretched for miles on either side of the river, even near Upper Newport Bay, which has also served as an alternate mouth of the river.

The alpine and subalpine zones, despite their high elevation (above 9,500 feet, 2,900 meters) and significant rainfall (at least 35 inches, 89 centimeters per year, except in drought years), are sparsely vegetated. The windswept terrain of the alpine zone is primarily small brush and weeds, while trees—mostly small, gnarled pines and junipers—occur in canyons and shielded depressions in the subalpine zone. Inland elevations above 5,000 feet (1,500 m) support much denser forest. Jeffrey pine, ponderosa pine, black oak, lodgepole pine, and willow constitute most of the forested lands. The mountain habitats of the watershed support many animals typical of Californian mountain regions, including squirrels, chipmunks, black bears, mule deer, and many species of migratory birds. In the canyons of the San Bernardinos, the river is abundant in rainbow trout and is lined with alders, willow, and cottonwoods. Where the river and its large upper tributaries empty out of the mountain canyons into the Inland Empire basin, they are surrounded by the alluvial scrub zone, a mix of desert and upper riparian vegetation. Along the main stem, this zone begins at the base of Seven Oaks Dam and ends at the Lytle Creek confluence.

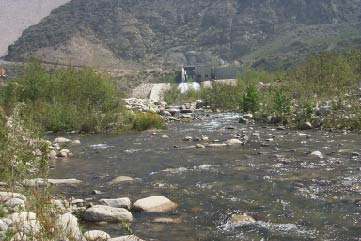
This segment of the Santa Ana River just downstream of Seven Oaks Dam marks the beginning of the inland riparian zone

Historically, the Santa Ana was named "the best stream in Southern California [for steelhead trout habitat]". The steelhead is an anadromous fish, similar to salmon, that migrates up rivers and streams to spawn. Unlike salmon, which usually only reproduce once, steelhead may reproduce multiple times and have a much longer life span. Steelhead was once found along the entire main stem of the Santa Ana River, as well as on some of its main tributaries—Santiago Creek, San Antonio and Chino Creeks, Cucamonga Creek, Lytle Creek, City Creek, and Mill Creek. Few, if any, steelhead were present in Temescal Creek (although one of its tributaries was stocked in the 1930s) and none inhabited the San Jacinto River, because it is disconnected from most of the Santa Ana River system. Up to the 1950s, significant numbers of steelhead trout still migrated in from the ocean. Because of pollution and modifications to the river, very few steelhead still use the river. There is a population of wild stream resident coastal rainbow trout upstream of Seven Oaks Dam and in the upper reaches of a few tributaries. Despite the rarity of steelhead, fin samples from 13 trout were collected in recent years from Harding Canyon in the Santiago Creek tributary of the Santa Ana River, and genetic analysis has shown them to be of native and not hatchery stocks.

Invasive species have caused problems in the watershed for many years. One of the most troublesome invasive species is the giant reed, which plagues many coastal Southern California waterways. The giant reed is similar to a tall grass or thin bamboo, but it grows quickly and can take over native stands of vegetation, block the streambed, hurt the habitat of native animals, and increase the hazard of wildfires. Perhaps the largest effect that giant reed has is its usage of water. To support its fast growth rate, the giant reed population in the Santa Ana River watershed can consume 56,200 acre-feet (69,300,000 m^{3}) of water per year.

Other invasive species also have affected the Santa Ana River. One of the most prominent is the brown-headed cowbird, which feeds off parasites and insects identified with cattle, which were brought to Southern California during the Spanish Rancho period. The brown-headed cowbird is a "brood parasite", or a bird that lays its eggs in another bird's nest. One of the most afflicted birds is the least Bell's vireo, whose population also suffers from the loss of riparian habitat. The least Bell's vireo is considered an endangered species, as is the southwestern willow flycatcher, whose habitat is often shared with the other bird. The saltcedar is another invasive large weed that, like the giant reed, uses large amounts of water. Unlike giant reed, the saltcedar has deeper roots, not only making it more difficult to remove but allowing it to access and deplete deep groundwater. However, the saltcedar is similar in that it also provides little usable habitat for native animals.

== History ==
=== First peoples ===
Human habitation on the Santa Ana River dates back 9,000 to 12,000 years ago, close to the early stages of the Holocene period. The first Native Americans to live in the area were nomadic tribes that traveled from place to place, grazing animals on fertile grasslands and gathering fruits and seeds for food. The ancestors of these early people originated from the Shoshone and Uto-Aztecan people of the northwestern United States. Eventually, the human population of the watershed reached a peak of about 15,000. About 8,000 years ago, the climate became more arid, and the originally nomadic tribes began to stay in individual places longer, becoming semi-nomadic. However, they did not establish agriculture, nor did they raise animals or live in villages. Like many Native American tribes in California, acorns were a staple food of many of the inland valley people. People closer to the ocean often fished and hunted small animals, frequently from tide pools and coastal stream areas, for food.

Several major premodern Native American groups eventually gained control of lands along the river: the Yuhaviatam or Yuharetum people in the upper basin, the Payomkowishum in the southeastern basin, the Cahuilla in the desert areas of the watershed, and the Tongva people in the lower basin. The Yuhaviatam generally lived in the mountain headwaters of the Santa Ana River and its tributaries rimming the present-day Inland Empire basin; in present-day San Bernardino County; and in the foothills of the San Bernardino Mountains. The Tongva lived on the flat coastal plains of present-day Orange County south of the Santa Ana Mountains. They were also the larger of the two groups, controlling all the coastal lands from the San Gabriel Mountains in the north to Aliso Creek in the south, including all of the Los Angeles Basin. These peoples established villages, some of which were multiethnic and multilingual, including Lupukngna, Genga, Pajbenga, Totpavit, and Hutuknga.

The Tongva and the Acjachemem called the river Wanaawna.

=== Spanish period ===
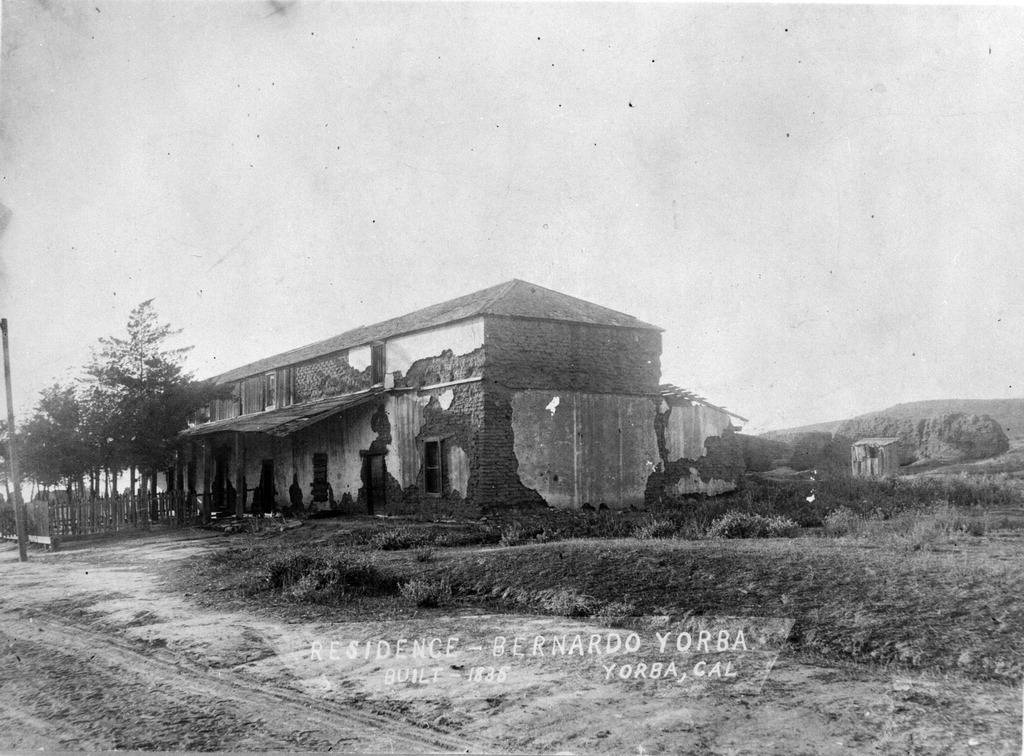
Bernardo Yorba Adobe was built by Mexican settlers in Rancho Cañón de Santa Ana in 1835

When Spanish explorer Juan Rodriguez Cabrillo sailed along the Southern California coast on his voyage of 1542, he passed the mouth of the Santa Ana River without noting it. Neither did any of the subsequent Spanish sea-borne explorers leave any written notice of the river mouth.

It was not until 1769 that Gaspar de Portolà led the first overland expedition northwards through coastal Southern California—still a largely unexplored part of the Alta California province of New Spain—and gave the river its name. On July 28, the party camped "about three leagues" from where the Santa Ana River exits the canyon through the northern Santa Ana Mountains, near present-day Olive. Fray Juan Crespí, one of the members of the expedition, wrote in his diary that he called the spot "Jesus de los Temblores", referring to an earthquake that struck while they were camped alongside there. Crespí also noted that the soldiers were calling the river "Rio de Santa Ana", probably because they had recently celebrated Saint Anne's Day. That name remains today (the second oldest place name in Orange County, after Santiago Creek), and the name of the mountain range and city were derived from the river.

Although no missions were actually located along the Santa Ana River or within the watershed, the river basin was nearly depleted of native people because the Spanish forced them to work at nearby missions, including Mission San Gabriel Arcangel and Mission San Luis Rey. The affected tribes were usually renamed after the missions, resulting in tribal names such as Gabrieliño and Luiseño. Difficult working and living conditions and European diseases such as smallpox killed much of the native population during the roughly 50-year-long Mission Period. The Secularization Act of 1833, passed by the newly independent country of Mexico, eventually brought an end to the Mission Period. The post-Mission Period native population was almost entirely devastated. The population was very little, their native religions were nearly lost, and most of their land had been taken by Spanish settlers. Although the Mexican government's original intention with the Secularization Act was to provide the Native Americans with their own land and property, most of the provisions made by the act never actually happened. Spanish settlers continued to press into the remaining tribal lands, and eventually, the tribes were forced into the surrounding desert lands or into the high mountains.

Following the Mission Period came the Rancho Period. This occurred when the enormous land holdings of the missions were subdivided into ranchos owned by individuals. Some of the new private ranchos were merely converted mission ranchos. The first private rancho along the Santa Ana River was Rancho Santiago de Santa Ana, a 62,500-acre (253 km^{2}) rancho on the left bank of the lower Santa Ana River. This rancho was acquired by Don Juan Pablo Grijalva as early as 1801. Other ranchos on the river followed, including ones in inland areas that had not been exploited in the Mission Period. The ranchos (beginning with the missions) established the tradition of raising cattle in coastal Southern California, a custom upheld until the late 19th century. Agriculture, however, although established, was not yet a major industry. A flood that raged down the Santa Ana in 1825 caused the river's course to change temporarily to an outlet at Newport Bay, depositing sediment that partially created Balboa Island. Spread throughout the ranchos on the Santa Ana River were a few towns, military outposts, and trading posts. The Santa Ana River valley was one of the most prosperous regions in Southern California for many decades.

=== American settlement ===
In the late 1840s, California fought for its independence from Mexico in the Mexican–American War. The Santa Ana river played an important part in the victory of the Americans over the Mexican army. In 1847, one year after the Bear Flag Revolt, a Mexican military force set out northwards to attack a smaller American force in the Los Angeles area. However, the Santa Ana River flooded, preventing the Mexicans from crossing the river to attack the Americans. When the river's flow finally subsided, the American forces had been reinforced enough to drive the Mexicans out of the region.

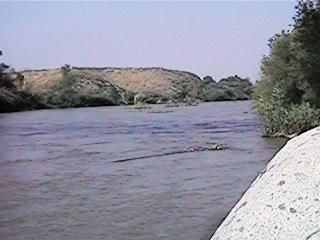
The Santa Ana River near Riverside

When the California Republic was assimilated into the United States in 1848, American settlers began to move into the Santa Ana River region in great numbers. The Mexican ranchos were divided into smaller individual properties, and irrigated agriculture began on a large scale. The city of Santa Ana Viejo, the original location of Santa Ana, was founded in this period. In 1854, Mormons settled in the upper Inland Empire area and started the city of San Bernardino, gaining prosperity by using water from the river, as well as Lytle Creek and Mill Creek, to irrigate crops. The cattle industry began to decline as farms began to replace ranches. Soon, white settlers in the region were more numerous than Hispanics as well. The California Gold Rush around this time was responsible for attracting many of these people to the state, but many remained in Southern California afterwards.

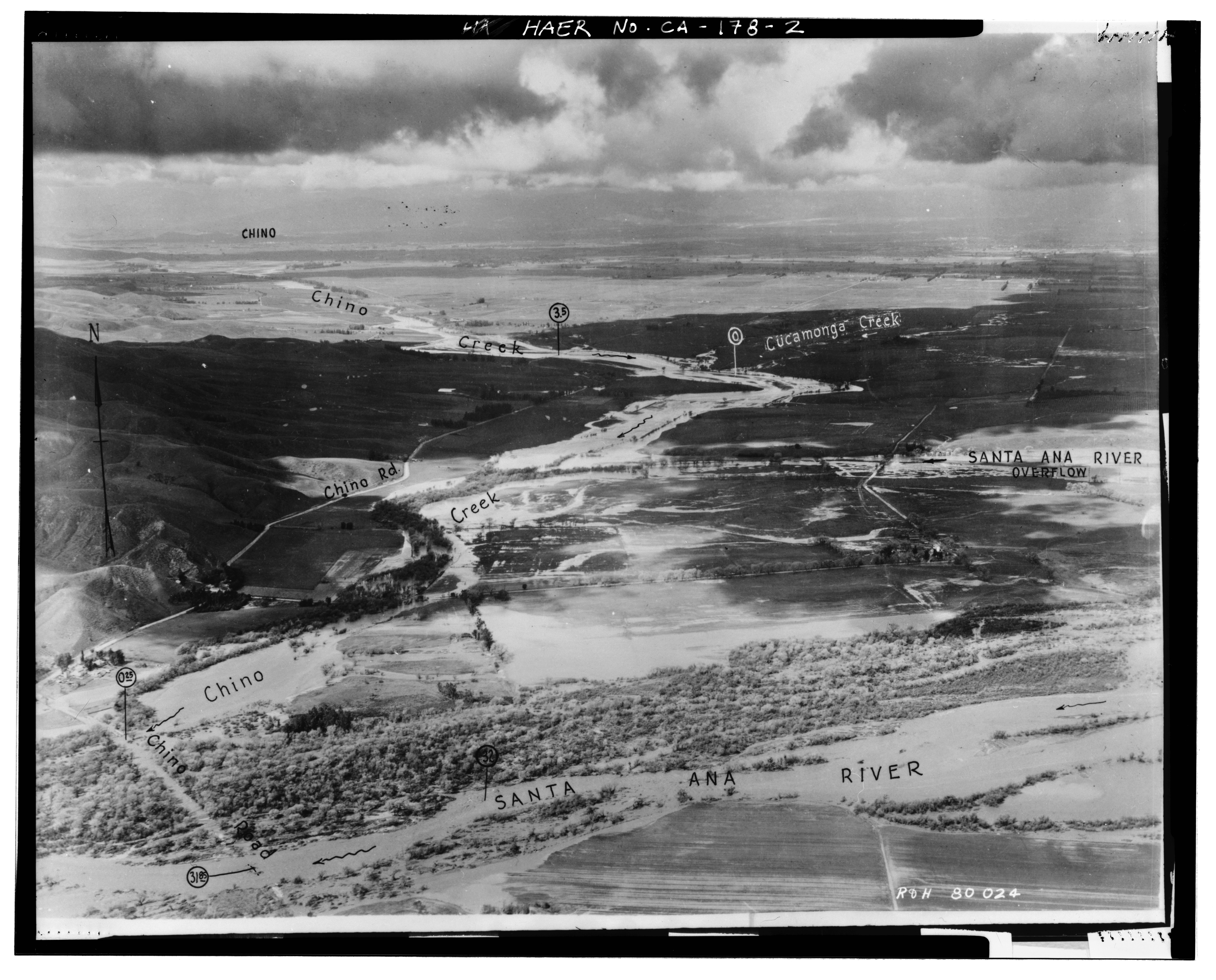
Santa Ana River at Chino Creek. This is an oblique aerial view to the north, looking over the flooded fields between Chino Creek and the Santa Ana River

In 1860, a much closer gold rush occurred in the San Bernardino Mountains when prospector William Holcomb discovered significant deposits, just over the northern drainage divide of the Santa Ana River. This discovery exploded into a full-scale gold mining operation in days. The Santa Ana River served as a conduit for miners traveling to the region and many of the forests in the upper basin experienced clearcutting as a result of the high resource demands of the boom. Gold was also discovered in Lytle Creek in that same year. Following the gold rush, the cultivation of citrus became the mainstay of the economy of the lower Santa Ana River area. Through the late 19th century, citrus fields covered much of the coastal plain and led to the naming of Orange County.

=== Floods, droughts, and legacy ===
The Santa Ana River flooding in 1938, just downstream of Santa Ana Canyon. This view, taken by a Los Angeles Times photographer from a United Air Lines "Mainliner", shows flooded agricultural fields in central Orange County, with the Pacific Ocean in the distance.

Notwithstanding the increased prosperity in the 1860s, this decade was also the scene of a series of natural disasters. In the Great Flood of 1862, heavy rains dropped by a series of winter storms caused the Santa Ana to burst its banks, flooding thousands of acres of land and killing 20 to 40 people in the greatest flood it had experienced in recorded history. The levees along the river burst in many places, flooding part of the Inland Empire into a continuous body of water several miles wide, stretching from the mouth of Santa Ana Canyon to where the river cuts through the Santa Ana Mountains. Downstream in Orange County, the river overwhelmed nearly all the existing floodworks and transformed the coastal plain into a transient inland sea. The flow, now calculated as a 1,000-year flood, peaked at roughly 9,000 cubic meters per second (320,000 cu ft/s), over half the average flow of the Mississippi River. Even after the flood, detrimental conditions continued in the region. For the two years following the flood, an intense drought caused the deaths of tens of thousands of head of livestock. Despite all of the hardships experienced in the three years, after conditions finally returned to normal, the Santa Ana River watershed again became a prospering agricultural region. The cities of Santa Ana and Riverside were established in 1869 and 1870, respectively.

1934 and 1938 saw a further pair of devastating floods that, in part, brought an end to the area's citrus industry. In the Los Angeles flood of 1938, the Santa Ana again burst its banks and flooded Anaheim and Orange in up to 4 feet (1.2 m) of water, stripping away thousands of acres of rich topsoil and destroying many of the citrus groves. Almost 60 people were killed in the disaster, and about 68,400 acres (277 km^{2}) of land were flooded despite the fact that the flow in the river was only one-third of that of the 1862 flood. With the extreme damage from the floods, the U.S. Army Corps of Engineers made the decision to dam and concrete the river beginning in the 1940s, and they declared it the greatest flood hazard in the U.S. west of the Mississippi River. Prado Dam, built in 1941, was designed to capture floodwaters from the Inland Empire about 30 miles (48 km) upstream from the river's mouth. The dam's impoundment, Prado Flood Control Basin, was designed to handle a 70-year flood.

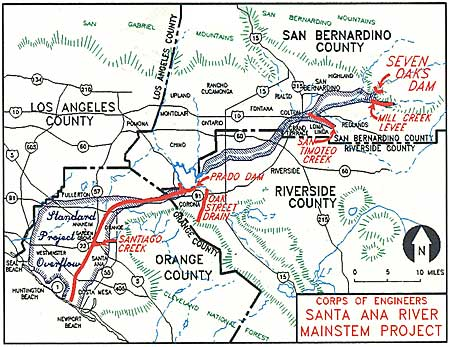
Army Corps of Engineers map of the 100-year floodplain of the Santa Ana River

With the increased flood protection afforded by the Prado Dam, major industrial development migrating south from the Los Angeles Basin, and the Southern California housing boom in the 1950s and 1960s, the Santa Ana River watershed began its third and final transition—from agricultural to urban. The population of the Santa Ana River basin increased dramatically but brought with it the threat of greater damage from floods, somewhat compromising the protection afforded by Prado Dam. Because housing and urban areas encroached on the river's historic floodplain (an area once occupied by farms) and the river had become confined to a narrow channel, a flood similar to the ones surrounding the turn of the 20th century would cause much more damage. The construction of roads and buildings also heightened the runoff that would flow into the river during rainfall, a process known as urban runoff. In fact, the river flooded again in 1969, and while much of the runoff from the Inland Empire was captured behind Prado Dam—probably saving Orange County from an even greater flood—Santiago Creek, a large tributary flowing from the Santa Ana Mountains, eroded its banks until it swept away portions of residential communities in the cities of Tustin and Orange.

In 1964, the Santa Ana River Mainstem Project, which involved concreting the lower 30.4 miles (48.9 km) of the river, was first proposed. Construction work began in 1989, and today, through much of Orange County, the river's channel is essentially an enormous box culvert. The second dam, Seven Oaks Dam, was completed in 1999. This dam captures flood runoff from Santa Ana Canyon before it can enter the Inland Empire. The dam was designed to withstand a 350-year flood. Today, the river lies mainly between levees and concrete channels, and especially in its lower course, functions only as a flood drainage channel.

== Pollution and restoration ==
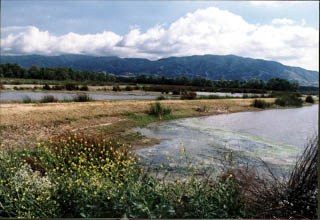
The Prado Flood Control Basin on the Santa Ana River has one of the largest remaining riparian zones along the main stem.

As with many Southern California rivers, the Santa Ana is heavily polluted and used. The main stem above Seven Oaks Dam is free-flowing, as are many of its upper tributaries. Once the river enters the Inland Empire basin, however, much of its flow is diverted for municipal and agricultural water use. Most of the flow in the river below the city of San Bernardino consists of effluent from 45 wastewater treatment plants and dry season urban runoff, which is collected behind Prado Dam. Any flow that makes it downstream to Orange County is diverted by another pair of dams into approximately 1,100 acres (4.5 km^{2}) of groundwater recharge basins, providing approximately 218,000 acre-feet (269,000,000 m^{3}) of municipal water for the county every year, or one-third of its water supply. Downstream of that dam, the river gathers further urban runoff before finally making it into the Pacific. The Santa Ana River is included on the U.S. Environmental Protection Agency's (EPA) list of "304 (l) 'toxic hot spots' list of impaired waterways".

Orange County formed the Orange County Water District (OCWD) in 1932 to manage the county's groundwater. Today, it uses the treated water from upstream to recharge a massive reservoir, or aquifer, that runs roughly nine miles from Lakeview Avenue to Ball Road. The water percolates through layers of sand and gravel, which work to scrub or purify it. There, it joins treated wastewater pumped from the Orange County Sanitation Department's plant in Fountain Valley. Those two types of water account for 60 to 70 percent of the aquifer, which can hold 500,000 acre feet. Combined with water imported from Northern California and the Colorado River, the OCWD maintains that the aquifer could serve the water needs of all its clients for a year.

A number of organizations have been formed to try to gain public interest in restoring the river. This includes the Santa Ana Watershed Project Authority (SAWPA), formed by five municipal water districts in the Santa Ana River area, and the Santa Ana River Dischargers Association. Both have conducted studies as to what beneficial uses the Santa Ana River would have aside from water supply and flood control, as well as the removal of some of the concreted sections of the lower river. This set of studies is known as the "Use-Attainability Analysis", which was submitted to the state Congress, which approved it. However, upon submission to the EPA, it was rejected. As a result, little work has been done to repair the ecological damage that has been caused by urbanization along the river. Other projects include the Santa Ana Watershed Planning Advisory Committee and the Santa Ana River Watershed Alliance (SARWA).

== Recreation ==
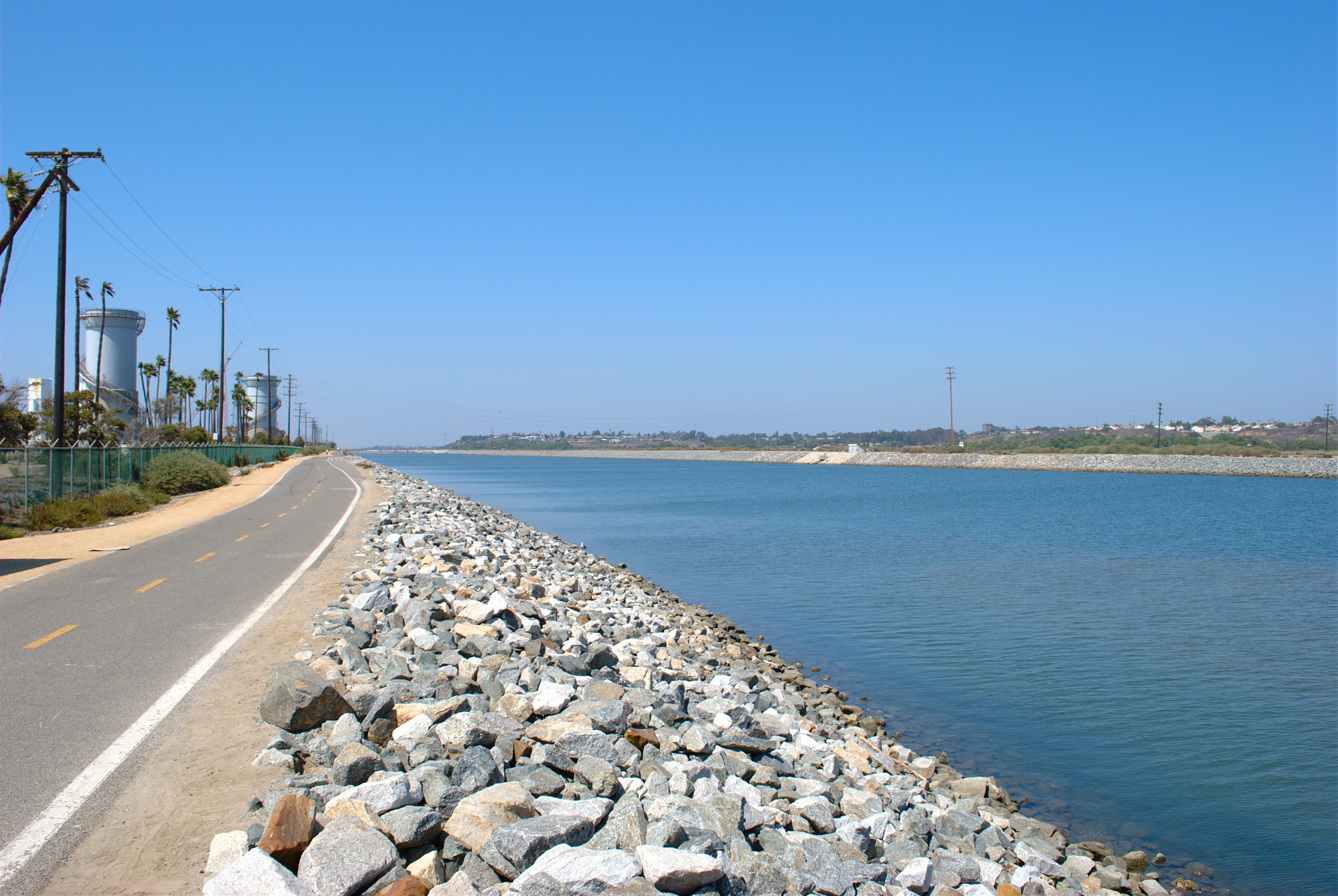
The Santa Ana River bicycle path

There are many recreational opportunities along the Santa Ana River. The Santa Ana River watershed includes parts of the Cleveland National Forest, San Bernardino National Forest, Angeles National Forest, Mount San Jacinto State Wilderness Area, Chino Hills State Park, and Lake Perris State Recreation Area. Big Bear Lake, Lake Elsinore, and Lake Irvine are popular recreational lakes in the watershed. The river never actually flows through any of these lakes, but they each have drainage to the river via tributaries.

The Santa Ana River bicycle path which, when complete, will run from the river's mouth at Huntington Beach to near the San Bernardino Mountains, currently extends about 30 miles (48 km) along the river to Prado Dam. The proposed distance along the trail is over 70 miles (110 km). In Riverside County, the Hidden Valley Wildlife Area also has 25 miles (40 km) of recreational paths. Some entities have been opting for a Santa Ana River Park, which would encompass a strip of land on either side of the river for its entire course. The city of Redlands would like to develop riverside green space near the historic downtown district. The Santa Ana River Lakes, located near Anaheim, are a popular recreational fish farm fed with water from the river. Ultimately, the trail could link a network of river-bottom parks. In 2014, naturalists navigated the stretch of river flanked by Chino Hills State Park on the north and the Cleveland National Forest on the south. The rafts made it 2 miles (3.2 km) before the vegetation was impenetrable but they were convinced there were possibilities of improving public access and recreational opportunities.

== Crossings ==
The Santa Ana River has 70 significant crossings, bridges and dams. This list places them from mouth to source.

=== Orange County ===
- State Route 1 (Pacific Coast Highway) (Newport Beach/Huntington Beach)
- Victoria Street/Hamilton Avenue (Costa Mesa/Huntington Beach)
- Santa Ana River bicycle path (Costa Mesa/Huntington Beach)
- Adams Avenue (Costa Mesa/Huntington Beach)
- Interstate 405 (San Diego Freeway) (Costa Mesa/Fountain Valley)
- Talbert Avenue/MacArthur Boulevard (Santa Ana/Fountain Valley)
- Slater Avenue/West Segerstrom Avenue (Santa Ana/Fountain Valley)
- Warner Avenue (Santa Ana/Fountain Valley)
- Harbor Boulevard (Santa Ana)
- Edinger Avenue (Santa Ana)
- McFadden Avenue (Santa Ana)
- Bolsa Avenue/1st Street (Santa Ana)
- 5th Street (Santa Ana)
- Former Pacific Electric Railway Railway Bridge (future OC Streetcar)
- Fairview Street (Santa Ana)
- Westminster Avenue/17th Street (Santa Ana)
- Santa Ana River bicycle path (Santa Ana)
- Garden Grove Boulevard/Memory Lane (Orange/Santa Ana)
- State Route 22 (Garden Grove Freeway) (Orange)
- Interstate 5 (Santa Ana Freeway) (Orange)
- Chapman Avenue (Orange/Anaheim)
- Orangewood Avenue (Orange/Anaheim)
- State Route 57 (Orange Freeway) (Orange/Anaheim)
- Metrolink Orange County Line & Amtrak Pacific Surfliner (Orange/Anaheim)
- Katella Avenue (Orange/Anaheim)
- Railroad Bridge (Orange/Anaheim)
- Taft Avenue/Ball Road (Orange/Anaheim)
- Lincoln Avenue (Orange/Anaheim)
- Glassell Street/Kraemer Boulevard (Orange/Anaheim)
- Metrolink Inland Empire–Orange County Line (Anaheim)
- Tustin Avenue (Anaheim)
- State Route 91 (Riverside Freeway) (Anaheim)
- Lakeview Avenue (Anaheim)
- State Route 90 (Imperial Highway) (Anaheim)
- Santa Ana River bicycle path (Anaheim)
- Weir Canyon Road (Anaheim/Yorba Linda)
- bnsf railway bridge
- Gypsum Canyon Road (Yorba Linda)

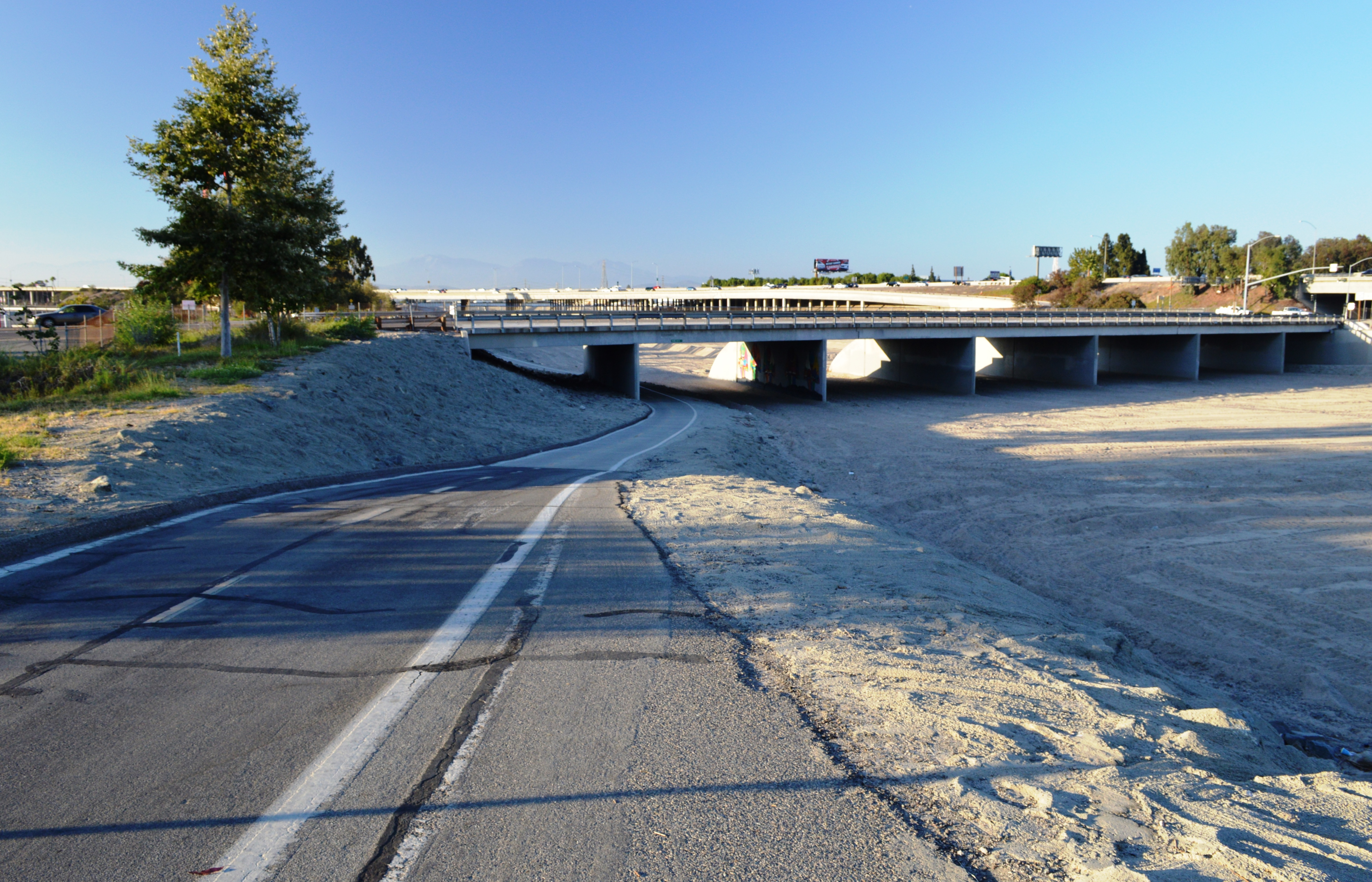
The Orangewood Avenue bridge near Angel Stadium of Anaheim

=== Riverside County ===
- Green River Road (Corona)
- Metrolink 91/Perris Valley & Inland Empire-Orange County lines (Corona)
- State Route 71 (Corona Freeway)
- Prado Dam
- River Road (Norco/Eastvale)
- Hamner Avenue (Norco)
- Interstate 15 (Ontario Freeway) (Norco)
- Van Buren Boulevard (Jurupa Valley)
- Metrolink Riverside Line (Jurupa Valley/Riverside)
- Mission Boulevard/Buena Vista Avenue (Jurupa Valley/Riverside)
- State Route 60 (Pomona Freeway) (Jurupa Valley/Riverside)
- Market Street (Jurupa Valley/Riverside)

=== San Bernardino County ===
- Riverside Avenue (Colton)
- La Cadena Drive (Colton)
- Metrolink Inland Empire-Orange County Line (Colton)
- Railroad Bridge (Colton)
- Mount Vernon Avenue (Colton)
- Amtrak Sunset Limited & Texas Eagle (Colton)
- Interstate 10 (San Bernardino/Redlands Freeway) (Colton)
- Interstate 215 (San Bernardino/Riverside Freeway) (San Bernardino)
- E Street (San Bernardino)
- Waterman Avenue (San Bernardino)
- Arrow commuter rail service (San Bernardino)
- Orange Show Road (San Bernardino)
- Tippecanoe Avenue (San Bernardino)
- Alabama Street (Redlands)
- State Route 210 (Foothill Freeway) (Redlands)
- Orange Street (Redlands)
- Greenspot Road (Highland)
- Santa Ana Canyon Road
- Seven Oaks Dam
- State Route 38 (Rim of the World Scenic Byway)

== See also ==
- List of rivers of Orange County, California
- List of tributaries of the Santa Ana River
- Category: Populated places on the Santa Ana River
- List of rivers of California
- List of watershed topics
