= Prado Dam =

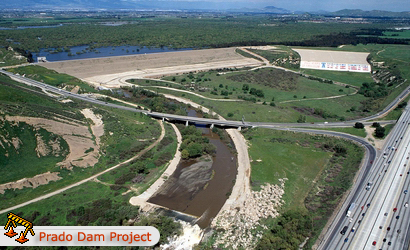
- Prado Dam above the Chino Valley Freeway (SR 71)/Riverside Freeway (SR 91) interchange
- Location: Riverside County, California
- Coordinates: 33.8902°N 117.6408°W
- Opening date: April 1941; 84 years ago
- Owner(s): U.S. Army Corps of Engineers

Dam and spillways
- Type of dam: Earth-fill dam
- Impounds: Santa Ana River
- Height: 162 ft (49 m)
- Length: 2,280 ft (690 m)
- Width (crest): 30 ft (9.1 m)
- Dam volume: 3,389,000 cu yd (2,591,000 m^{3})

Reservoir
- Creates: Prado Flood Control Basin
- Total capacity: 314,400 acre⋅ft (387,800 dam^{3})
- Catchment area: 2,230 sq mi (5,800 km^{2})
- Surface area: 6,600 acres (2,700 ha)

Prado Dam is an earth-fill dry dam across the Santa Ana River at the Chino Hills near Corona, California in Riverside County with the resulting impounded water creating Prado Flood Control Basin reservoir. The U.S. Army Corps of Engineers built the dam in Lower Santa Ana River Canyon. Its primary purpose is flood control and it is the downstream element of the Santa Ana River's flood control system, which is a natural constriction about 30.5 mi (49.1 km) upstream from the ocean. The area upstream from the dam contains 2,255 sq mi (5,840 km^{2}) of the watershed's 2,650 sq mi (6,900 km^{2}). The dam's construction was authorized in 1936 and the flood of 1938 demonstrated its necessity. Construction was completed in 1941. Prado Flood Control Basin also provides water storage for groundwater recharge operations.

== Failure threat ==
On January 14, 2005, after days of heavy rain, water began seeping through an earthen extension. Authorities released water in order to relieve pressure and sent a flood warning to areas downriver of the dam. Over 3,000 residents were evacuated from their homes for nearly twenty-four hours for fear of flooding. The gymnasium at Corona High School was converted by the American Red Cross into a temporary shelter.

== Upgrades ==
As of 2005 work to increase the downstream channel's capacity from 5,000 to 30,000 cu ft (140 to 850 m^{3}) per second is ongoing. The total costs of the improvements is estimated at $400 million.

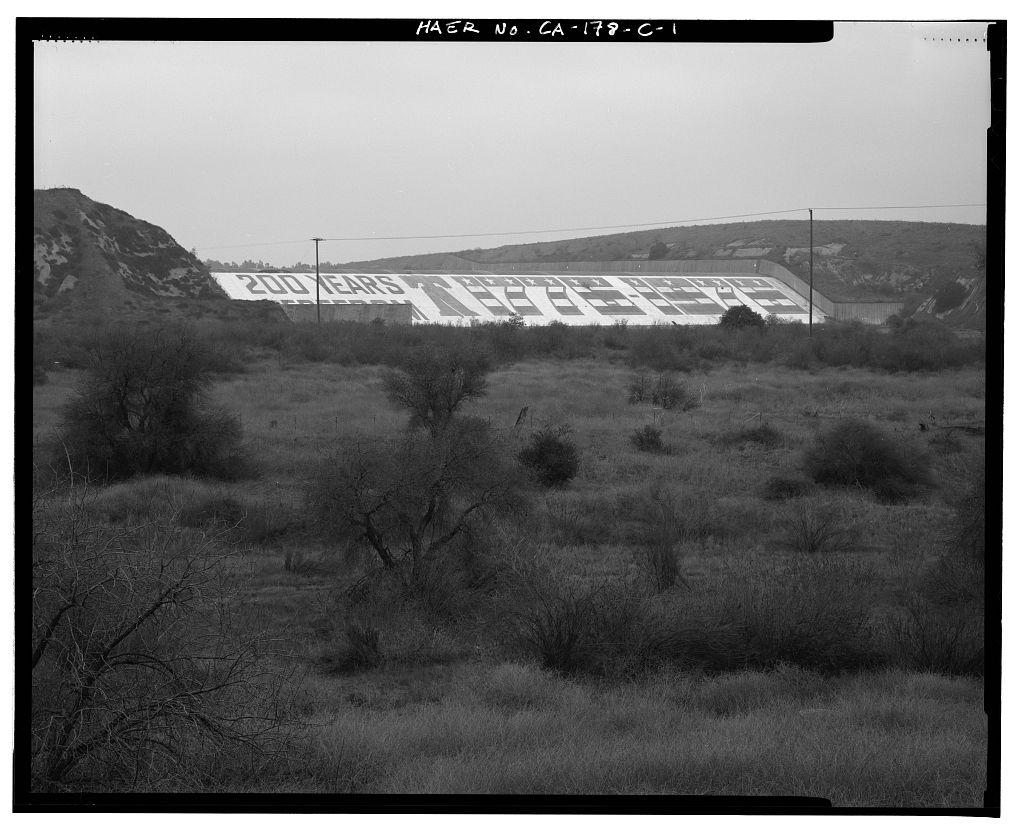
Prado Dam Spillway, with American Bicentennial mural.

== See also ==
- List of dams and reservoirs in California
- List of largest reservoirs of California
