= Temescal =

Temescal, Temascal and Temazcal are all forms of the Nahuatl word temāzcalli which refers to a type of sweat lodge used by indigenous Mesoamericans.

Temescal, Temascal, or Temazcal might also refer to:

== Mexico ==
- Temascal, Oaxaca
- Temazcal Limestone

== United States ==
=== Alameda County, California ===
- Temescal, Oakland, California, a neighborhood
- Temescal Creek (Northern California)
- Lake Temescal
- Temescal Regional Park, the park surrounding Lake Temescal.

=== Los Angeles & Ventura Counties, California ===
- Rancho Temescal
- Temescal Canyon, Los Angeles County

=== Riverside County, California ===
- Rancho Temescal (Serrano)
- Temescal Canyon
- Temescal Canyon High School (Lake Elsinore, California)
- Temescal Creek (Riverside County)
- Temescal Freeway, a name for California State Route 71
- Temescal Mountains
- Temescal Valley (California), a valley
- Temescal Valley, California, a census-designated place
- Temescal Butterfield stage station
  - Temescal, Corona, California, the settlement that grew up around Temescal Station
