= California Historical Landmarks in Riverside County =

List table of the properties and districts listed on the California Historical Landmarks within Riverside County, southern California.

- Note: Click the "Map of all coordinates" link to the right to view a Google map of all properties and districts with latitude and longitude coordinates in the table below.

== Listings ==
Image		Landmark name	Location	City or town	Summary
Blythe Intake	948	Blythe Intake	Palo Verde Dam; 33°43′54″N 114°30′57″W	Blythe	
Giant desert figures	101	Giant desert figures	On Hwy 95; 33°48′00″N 114°31′39″W	Blythe	
Site of Louis Rubidoux House	102	Site of Louis Rubidoux House	5575 block, Mission Blvd. 33°59′49″N 117°24′22″W	Rubidoux	
Temescal Butterfield stage station	188	Temescal Butterfield stage station	20730 Temescal Canyon Rd. 33°48′59″N 117°30′31″W	Temescal Valley	The marker for the Temescal Butterfield Stage Station has since been removed, replaced during construction of a housing development or when Temescal Canyon Road was widened. The site now appears to be near where Breezy Meadow Lane intersects Temescal Canyon Road.
Carved Rock	187	Carved Rock	33°46′27″N 117°28′30″W	Temescal Valley	The petroglyphs, were carved by the Luiseño Indians, their meaning is said to be: 'A chief died here. These are his plumes, his portrait, his sign, and the animals sacred to him.' The Luiseño Indians who lived in Temescal Valley belonged to the Shoshoean linguistic group. The rock has been damaged by vandals. It is located on the east side of Temescal Canyon, 8 miles (13 km) south of Corona.
Upload Photo	992	Contractor's General Hospital	Next to post office, Ragsdale Rd. 33°42′49″N 115°24′09″W	Desert Center	
Corona Founders Monument	738	Corona Founders Monument	Corona City Park; 33°52′29″N 117°33′20″W	Corona	
de Anza crossing of the Santa Ana River, 1775 and 1776	787	de Anza crossing of the Santa Ana River, 1775 and 1776	Jurupa Hills Country Club Golf Course; 33°58′33″N 117°26′28″W	Jurupa Valley, Riverside	The crossing occurred between what is now the cities of Riverside, on the southwest side of the river, and Jurupa Valley. A memorial to the crossing has been placed in the Martha McLean – Anza Narrows park in the city of Riverside.
Camp Coxcomb at Desert Training Center	985	Camp Coxcomb at Desert Training Center	18 miles north of I-10 on SR 177; 33°54′30″N 115°14′53″W	Coxcomb Mountains	California–Arizona Maneuver Area – Camp Coxcomb
Camp Granite at Desert Training Center	985	Camp Granite at Desert Training Center	on SR 62, 5.4 miles east of SR 177; 34°04′50″N 115°07′59″W	Granite Mountains	California–Arizona Maneuver Area – Camp Granite
Camp Young at the Desert Training Center	985	Camp Young at the Desert Training Center	General George S. Patton Memorial Museum; 33°39′42″N 115°43′20″W	Chiriaco Summit	California–Arizona Maneuver Area – Camp Young
Hemet Maze Stone	557	Hemet Maze Stone	Maze Stone Park; 33°46′52″N 117°03′23″W	Hemet	
Jensen Alvarado Ranch	943	Jensen Alvarado Ranch	4350 Riverview Dr. 33°59′34″N 117°25′01″W	Riverside	
Mission Inn	761	Mission Inn	3649 Mission Inn Ave. 33°59′00″N 117°22′22″W	Riverside	
Old Temescal Road	638	Old Temescal Road	Old Hwy 71; 33°45′56″N 117°29′12″W	Temescal Valley	This route was first used by Luiseño and Gabrieleno Indians, whose villages were nearby. Leandro Serrano established a home here in 1820. Jackson and Warner traveled this route in 1831, and Frémont in 1848. It was the Southern Emigrant Trail for gold seekers in 1849 and other immigrants to California from then on. It was the Butterfield Overland Mail route from 1858 to 1861, part of the military road between Los Angeles and Fort Yuma from 1861 to 1866. From 1867 to 1877 it was again part of a stagecoach route between Los Angeles and Yuma, Arizona. With the advent of the automobile it was paved, becoming California State Route 71.
Painted Rock	190	Painted Rock	From Temescal Canyon Rd, go 0.1 mi E on Dawson Canyon Rd, then go 0.1 mi NE on Gravel Pit Rd, then 0.2 mi S along railroad track berm, site is 50 ft W of berm	Temescal Valley	In tribute to the earliest record of any people in this region, the Santa Fe Railway preserved this rock with its ancient pictograph, and the Committee of the Corona Women's Improvement Club placed a tablet marking the location 7 miles (11 km) south of Corona.
Parent Washington Navel Orange Tree	20	Parent Washington Navel Orange Tree	City Park, SW corner of Magnolia and Arlington Avenues; 33°56′46″N 117°24′06″W	Riverside	
Pochea Indian village site	104	Pochea Indian village site	Ramona Bowl, 27400 Ramona Bowl Road (S. Girard Street); 33°43′12″N 116°56′58″W	Hemet	
Ramona Bowl	1009	Ramona Bowl	27400 Ramona Bowl Road (S. Girard Street); 33°43′11″N 116°56′58″W	Hemet	
Rancho Santa Rosa	1005	Rancho Santa Rosa	22115 Tenaja Rd. 33°33′N 117°16′W	Murrieta	
Rubidoux Grist Mill Site	303	Rubidoux Grist Mill Site	5540 Molina Way; 33°59′43″N 117°24′24″W	Rubidoux	
Saahatpa	749	Saahatpa	Brookside Rest Area, W-bound I-10; 33°57′29″N 117°01′10″W	Beaumont	Chief Juan Antonio and his band of Cahuilla Indians helped Californio settlers in the San Bernardino area defend their property and livestock against outlaws and other tribal raiders during the 1840s and early 1850s. In late 1851, Juan Antonio, his warriors and their families, settled at nearby Saahatpa. During the winter of 1862–63, a smallpox epidemic swept through Southern California killing many Native Americans, including Juan Antonio and many of his people in Saahatpa. Cahuilla tradition asserts that the U.S. Government sent Army blankets that were contaminated with smallpox. After this disaster, Saahatpa was abandoned.
Serrano Boulder	185	Serrano Boulder	From I-15, take Old Temescal Canyon Rd S 0.4 mi to Lawson Rd, then go W 0.2 mi to dirt rd, then S 0.1 mi to site 33°46′10″N 117°29′27″W	Temescal Valley	Boulder marks the site of the first house in Riverside County, erected on the Rancho Temescal by Leandro Serrano about May 1824.
Serrano tanning vats	186	Serrano tanning vats	I-15 & Temescal Valley Rd. 33°45′47″N 117°28′08″W	Temescal Valley	Two vats used in making leather from cow hides, built in 1819 by the Luiseño Indians under the direction of Leandro Serrano.
Site of the de Anza camp, March 1774	103	Site of the de Anza camp, March 1774	60901 Coyote Canyon Rd. 33°29′57″N 116°36′13″W	Riverside	
Site of the Third Serrano Adobe	224	Site of the Third Serrano Adobe	NE corner of I-15 and Old Temescal Road; 33°46′40″N 117°29′10″W	Temescal Valley	Leandro Serrano set out orchards and vineyards and cultivated some of the fertile lands of the Temescal Valley. In the 1840s he built his third adobe on the Rancho Temescal, which the Serrano family occupied until 1898.
Soviet 1937 transpolar flight landing site	989	Soviet 1937 transpolar flight landing site	Cottonwood and Sanderson Streets; 33°46′56″N 116°57′33″W	San Jacinto	A record-distance non-stop flight between 12 and 14 July 1937 via the North Pole, started at Moscow, covered 11,500 kilometres (7,100 mi) in 62 hours and 17 minutes and ended in a dairy pasture outside of San Jacinto, California, after the crew had encountered fog conditions in San Diego

== See also ==
- List of California Historical Landmarks
- National Register of Historic Places listings in Riverside County, California
