= Temescal Valley =

Temescal Valley may refer to:

== Geoglogic ==
- Temescal Valley (California), in western Riverside County, California, a part of the Elsinore Trough.

== Geographic ==
- Temescal Valley, California a populated place in the Temescal Valley of California.
