= Rancho Temescal (Serrano) =

Rangeland in present-day Riverside County, California

Rancho Temescal was a farming outpost of Mission San Luis Rey de Francia, one of the 21 Franciscan missions established in California by Spain during the late 18th and early 19th centuries. The Mission was located on the coast where Oceanside, California, is today. The Rancho was settled in 1819 by Leandro Serrano, and became the first non-native settlement within the boundaries of what would become Riverside County, California.

Although Serrano applied for a land grant with Governor José María de Echeandía, during the Mexican administration of California, a grant was never issued. The only supporting evidence of his claim was a paper from the San Luis Rey Mission permitting him to occupy the land for grazing. After Serrano's death in 1852, his wife, Josefa Montalva de Serrano, continued to pursue the claim, now under the administration of the United States, but the claim was ultimately rejected by the US Supreme Court in 1866.

The grant claim extended along the Temescal Valley south of present-day Corona and encompassed El Cerrito and Lee Lake. At the time, Rancho Temescal was a part of San Bernardino County. Riverside County was created by the California Legislature in 1893 by taking land from both San Bernardino and San Diego County.

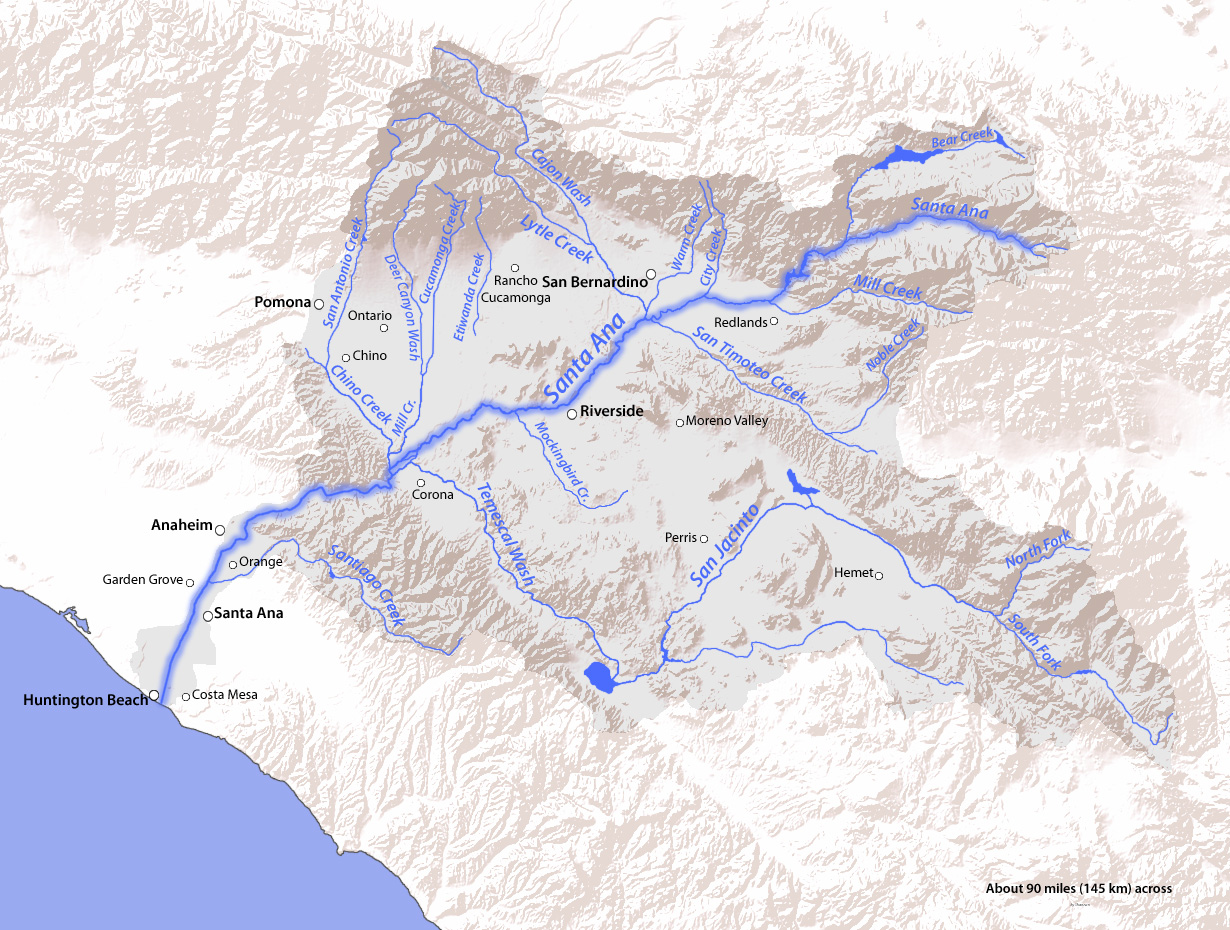
Map with Temescal Valley, California, home of Rancho Temescal

== History ==
Rancho Temescal has two Native American historic sites within the grant claim borders.

=== Rancho Temescal ===
Leandro Serrano (? –1852) was the son of one of the soldiers who came to California with Junípero Serra in 1769. Leandro Serrano was mayordomo of San Antonio de Pala Asistencia for the Mission of San Luis Rey. Serrano received the written permission of the priest of the Mission of San Luis Rey, or of the military commander of San Diego, to occupy the five square league Rancho Temescal (Mission of San Luis Rey land), and took possession in about 1818 or 1819. The Serrano Boulder (California Historical Landmark (#185), marks the site of the first house erected by Leandro Serrano about May 1824. By 1826 he had in addition to the adobe house, a garden with fruit trees, considerable cattle and horses. From 1828, Leandro was mayordomo of Mission San Juan Capistrano. In the early 1830s, another home was erected upon a knoll just above the first site, which commanded a far-reaching view, because of threatening trouble with the Mission Indians when the Missions in California were being closed. The ruins of this second adobe were still standing during the 1880s. In the 1840s Leandro built his third and last adobe on the road between San Diego and Los Angeles, which later became part of the Southern Emigrant Trail during the California Gold Rush. The Serrano family occupied the adobe until 1898. The site of this third adobe is on the northeast corner of I-15 and Old Temescal Road, 8 miles Southeast of Corona. Leandro continued to reside there with his family until his death in 1852. After his wife, Maria Presentacion Yorba (1791–1835) died in 1835, he married Josefa Montalva. His son, Jose Antonio Serrano, was grantee of Rancho Pauma.

=== Disputed Grant Claim ===
With the cession of California to the United States following the Mexican–American War, the 1848 Treaty of Guadalupe Hidalgo provided that the land grants would be honored. As required by the Land Act of 1851, a five square league claim for Rancho Temescal was filed by his widow, Josefa Montalva de Serrano, with the Public Land Commission in 1852, The claim was rejected by the Commission in 1855.

On an appeal to the US District Court the 1855 Commission ruling was reversed in 1859, which confirmed four square leagues. However, on appeal, the US Supreme Court ruled in 1866, that Leandro Serrano, had no title, legal or equitable, to the land. "Long-continued and undisturbed possession of land in California, whilst that country belonged to Spain or Mexico, under a simple permission to occupy it from a priest of an adjoining mission or a local military commander, did not create an equitable claim to the land against either of the governments of those countries, nor is a claim based upon such possession entitled to confirmation" under the Land Act of 1851.

When the decision came that the Serrano family had no right to an acre of the land they called their own, a 160-acre homestead was secured surrounding their home. Members of the family gradually left the valley until only the mother and two youngest daughters remained raising barley and cultivating their old orchard. By 1875 the rancho's lands, except a few little spots which the Serrano family and some later settlers had established, was purchased by a company of speculators for $3,000,000. When the mother, Senora Serrano, died there was no money for the funeral, so the sisters mortgaged their home to the South Riverside Land and Water Company, and buried Senora Serrano in the little graveyard at Agua Mansa, near Riverside. In 1898, the two sisters left Temescal to live in Los Angeles.

=== Temescal Butterfield Stage Station and Temescal ===
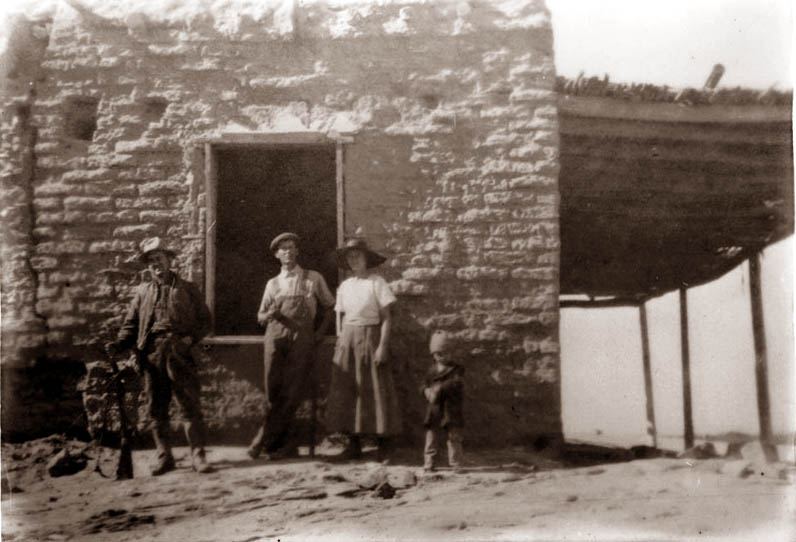
Temescal Butterfield Stage Station in 1860

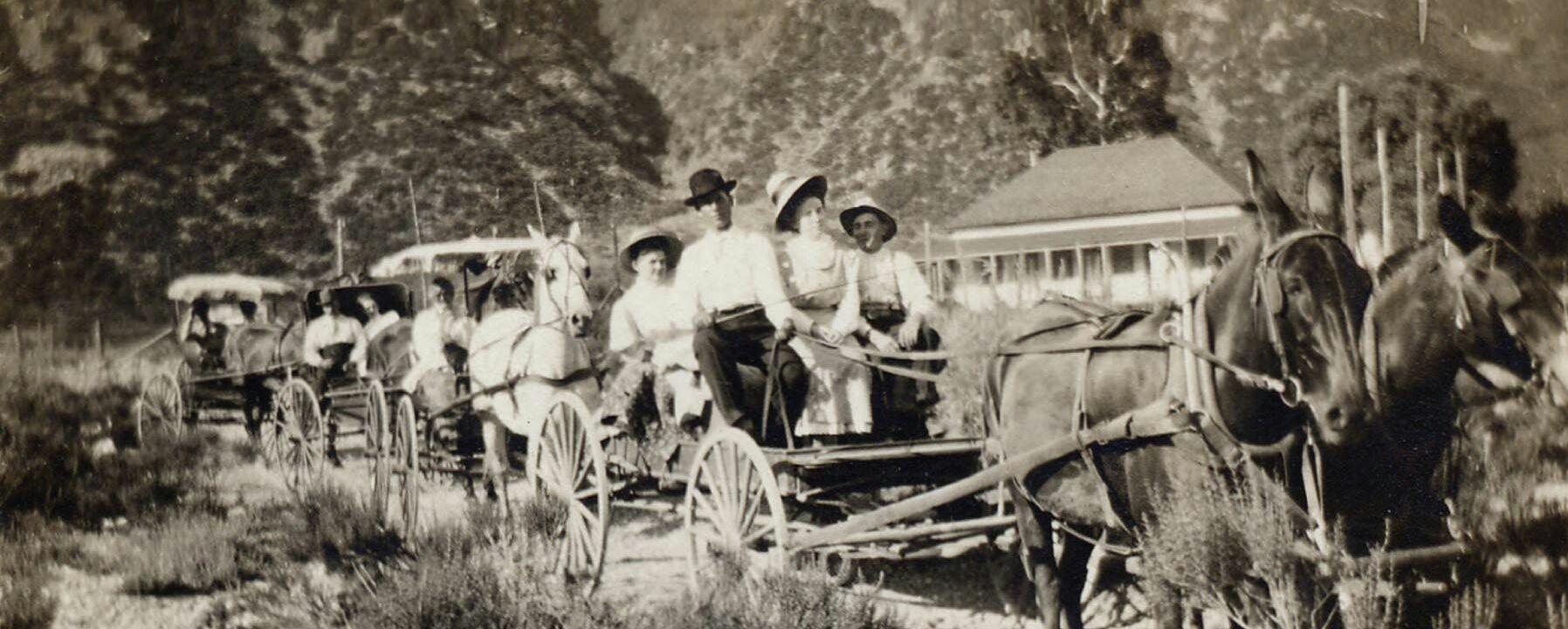
Old Temescal Road

Following the 1855 Public Land Commission ruling, squatters began settling in the Temescal Valley to establish title to land there under the Preemption Act of 1841. In 1857, the Temescal Station of the Butterfield Overland Mail stage line was established five miles north of the Temescal Hot Springs, ten miles north of Rancho La Laguna station and twenty miles south of the Chino Rancho station. The Temescal Overland station was "at the foot of the Temescal hills, a splendid place to camp, wood and water plenty, and protected from the winds." Temescal had its own post office from Feb 12, 1861 to Nov 12, 1861. Around this location the settlement of Temescal grew over the next few decades. By 1860, Greenwade's Place at Temescal, 3 miles north of the stage station, was a polling place for southwestern San Bernardino County. Voting irregularities there that year, resulted in a court case between the candidates for a California State Assembly seat. The trial was so contentious it included the shooting of Bethel Coopwood, one of the opposing lawyers by the other in court, before the results could be determined.

==== Temescal ====
In 1866, the Temescal School District was organized, the fifth in San Bernardino County. Its school house was built under a huge sycamore tree and served until 1889, when a new building took its place in the early 1900s. From October 29, 1874, to November 30, 1901, Temescal had a post office. During the 1870s, orchards and bee hives began to replace cattle and sheep ranching. The bees were first brought into the valley in the early seventies and became an important source of income in the valley.

===== Cajalco Tin Mine =====
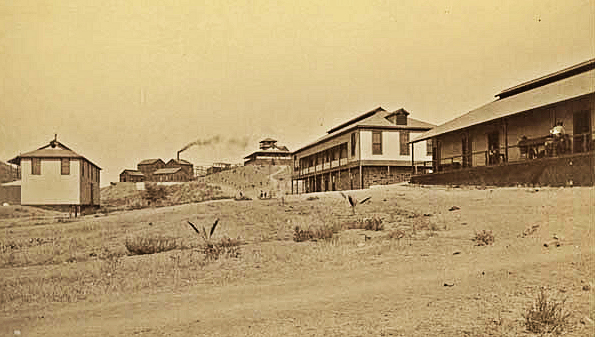
Cajalco Tin Mine in 1893

In 1856, Abel Stearns was convinced that the rancho's property contained tin ores and bought an interest in Rancho Temescal from Serrano's widow for 200 cattle. He was forced by his losses in the drought of 1862-64 to sell off his interest in the Temescal Rancho in 1864, for $100,000. The Cajalco Tin Mine, located east of Temescal, at 33°50′51″N 117°28′50″W, was developed after the 1866 ruling and produced tin by 1869. However the land title remained in dispute and no more development to the mines happened until an 1888 Supreme Court ruling settled the title.

After the Supreme Court ruling, experts from England examined the tin district, and made favorable reports which encouraged the California Mining and Smelting Company to be incorporated in London, on July 24, 1890, also another corporation, the San Jacinto Estate, Limited, was formed, by prominent financiers of London, including some of the men interested in the Welsh tin mines. The Rancho San Jacinto Sobrante, on which the mine was now located, was purchased, and the Temescal tin mine was at last opened up operating for the next two years. Temescal grew large with the influx of the miners. Up to July 1892, 136 tons of tin were produced; the first shipment reached New York on March 30, 1892. This was the first and last shipment; the Temescal tin mines were soon closed down in 1892. The valuable equipment and machinery were later sold and no effort has made to work the mine until after World War I. In 1927 the mine was reactivated by the American Tin Corporation, and extensive improvements were made until the stock market crash of 1929 forced the closing of the mine once again. In 1942 the Tinco Corporation, revived the mine in order to supply the demand for tin during World War II. Tinco installed a 100-ton mill which operated until 1945, when the mine closed for the last time.

==== South Riverside and Corona ====
In May 1886, the South Riverside Land and Water Company was incorporated, its members including ex-Governor of Iowa Samuel Merrill, R. B. Taylor, George L. Joy, A.S. Garretson, and Adolph Rimpau; as a citrus growers' organization, it purchased the lands of Rancho La Sierra of Bernardo Yorba, and the Rancho Temescal grant and the colony of South Riverside was laid out. They also secured the water rights to Temescal Creek, its tributaries and Lee Lake. Dams and pipelines were built to carry the water to the colony. In 1889, the Temescal Water Company was incorporated, to supply water for the new colony. This company purchased all the water-bearing lands in the valley and began drilling artesian wells. The first wells flowed, at a depth of 300 feet. However, pumping plants soon had to be installed. In time, all the water of both Temescal and Coldwater Creeks was diverted into pipe lines. Cienagas and springs were drained, and, gradually, the valley became dry and desolate. Farms and orchards in the central part of the Temescal Valley were abandoned, and the old adobes along the stage route crumbled and disappeared.

In 1896, South Riverside was renamed Corona for a 3-mile circular drive that is around the central city and was the site of international automobile races from 1913 to 1916. In 1901, the Temescal post office was closed moving to Corona.

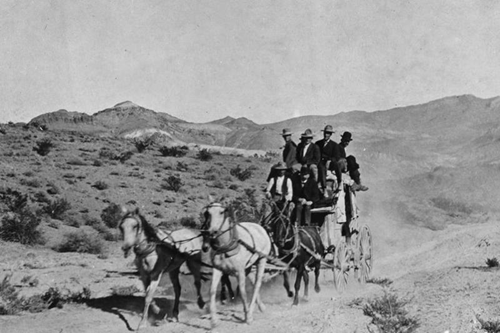
Butterfield Stage Stop Temecula in 1860

== Historic sites of the Rancho ==
- Painted Rock (California Historical Landmark #190), - In tribute to the earliest record of any people in this region, the Santa Fe Railway preserved this rock with its ancient pictograph, and the Committee of the Corona Women's Improvement Club placed a tablet marking the location 7 miles (11 km) south of Corona.
- Carved Rock (California Historical Landmark #187). The petroglyphs, were carved by the Luiseño Indians, their meaning is said to be: 'A chief died here. These are his plumes, his portrait, his sign, and the animals sacred to him.' The Luiseño Indians who lived in Temescal Valley belonged to the Shoshoean linguistic group. The rock has been damaged by vandals. It is located on the east side of Temescal canyon, 8 miles (13 km) south of Corona.
- Serrano Boulder (California Historical Landmark (#185). Boulder marks the site of the first house in Riverside County, erected by Leandro Serrano about May 1824.
- Old Temescal Road, (California Historical Landmark #638) - This route was first used by Luiseño and Gabrieleno Indians, whose villages were nearby. Leandro Serrano established a home here in 1820. Jackson and Warner traveled this route in 1831, and Frémont in 1848. It was the Southern Emigrant Road for gold seekers in 1849 and other immigrants to California from then on. It was the Butterfeild Overland Mail route from 1858 to 1861, part of the military road between Los Angeles and Fort Yuma from 1861 to 1866. With the advent of the automobile it was paved, becoming Highway 71. The landmark is located on Old Hwy 71, 0.9 miles (1 km) South of I-15 and Temescal Canyon Rd interchange, 11 miles (18 km) south of Corona.
- Serrano Tanning Vats, (California Historical Landmark #186). Two vats used in making leather from cow hides, built in 1819 by the Luiseño Indians under the direction of Leandro Serrano.
- Ruins of Third Serrano Adobe (California Historical Landmark #224) 8 miles (13 km) southeast of Corona. Leandro Serrano set out orchards and vineyards and cultivated some of the fertile lands of the Temescal Valley. In the 1840s he built his third adobe, which the Serrano family occupied until 1898.
- Butterfield Stage Station (California Historical Landmark #188). Site of the Temescal Butterfield stage station on the lands of Rancho Temescal where mail was delivered and horses changed. The first stage carrying overland mail left Tipton, Missouri on September 15, 1858 and, passing through Temescal, arrived in Los Angeles October 7, 1858. Marked by California Historical Landmark No. 188 on June 20, 1935, the marker has since been recently removed, apparently sometime during the period when the orange orchard it was near was replaced by a housing development or when Temescal Canyon Road was widened. The Station site was at 20730 Temescal Canyon Rd, 7 mi S of Corona. The site now appears to be near where Breezy Meadow Lane intersects Temescal Canyon Road.
- Corona Founders Monument,(California Historical Landmark #738). Taylor, Joy, Merrill, Garretson, and Rimpau, having purchased Rancho La Sierra of Bernardo Yorba and Rancho Temescal of Leandro Serrano on May 4, 1886, founded the citrus colony and town of Corona.

== See also ==
- List of Riverside County Historical Landmarks
