= Lemon Capital of the World =

The title of Lemon Capital of the World has been give to these places, for growing large amounts of lemons:

- South Riverside Land and Water Company now Corona, California. (1887 to 1980s).
- Chula Vista, California (1888 to present)
- Ventura County, California (1938 to present)
- Santa Paula, California (1938 to present) also called Citrus Capital of the World
- Saticoy, California (1938 to present)
- Florida
- Mexico
- India

Lemons need a minimum temperature of around 7 °C (45 °F), so the list is all places with mild winters.

== See also ==
- Citrus production
- Citrus rootstock
- List of citrus diseases
- Mother Orange Tree

== Gallery ==
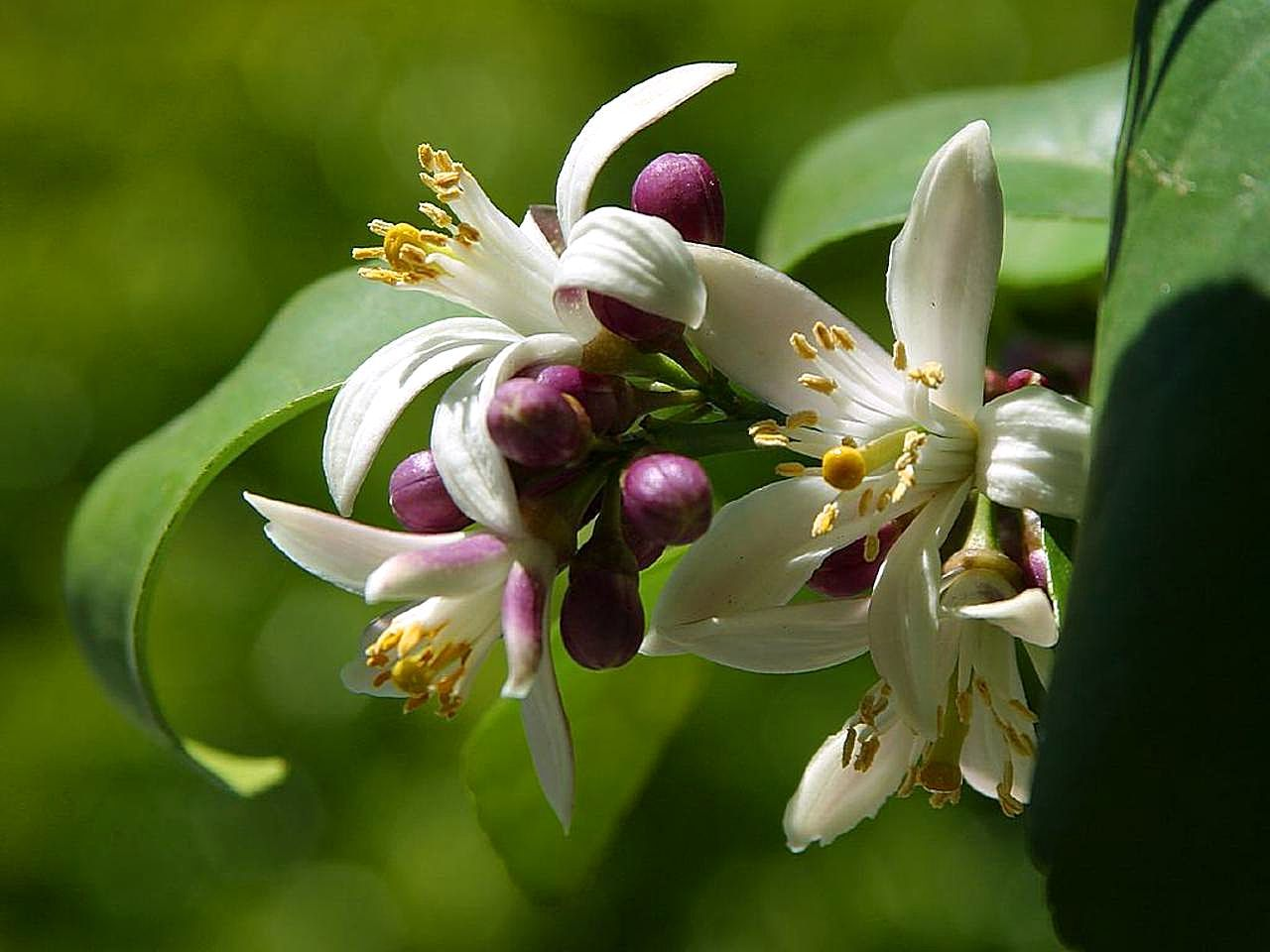
Flower

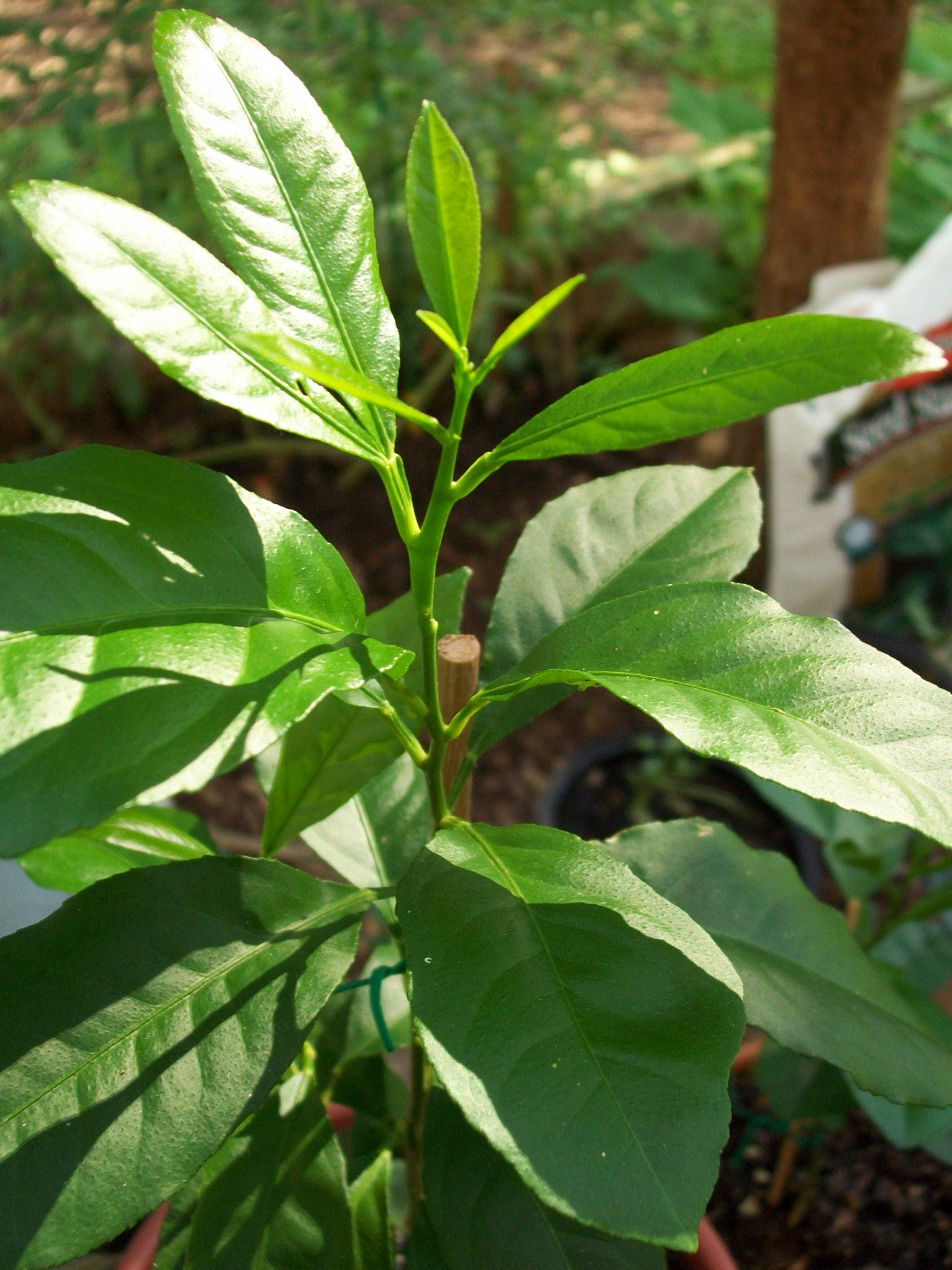
Lemon seedling

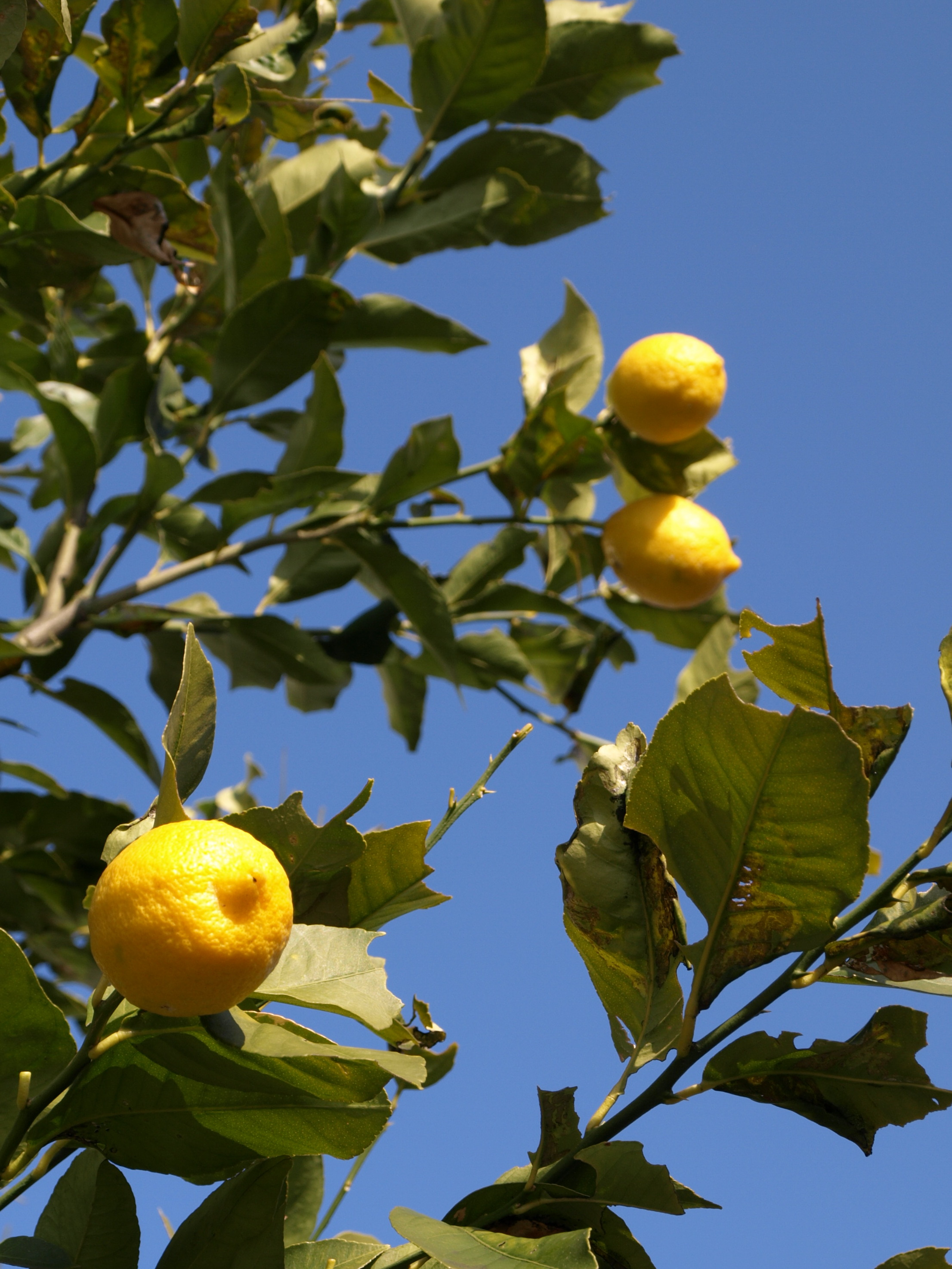
Mature lemons

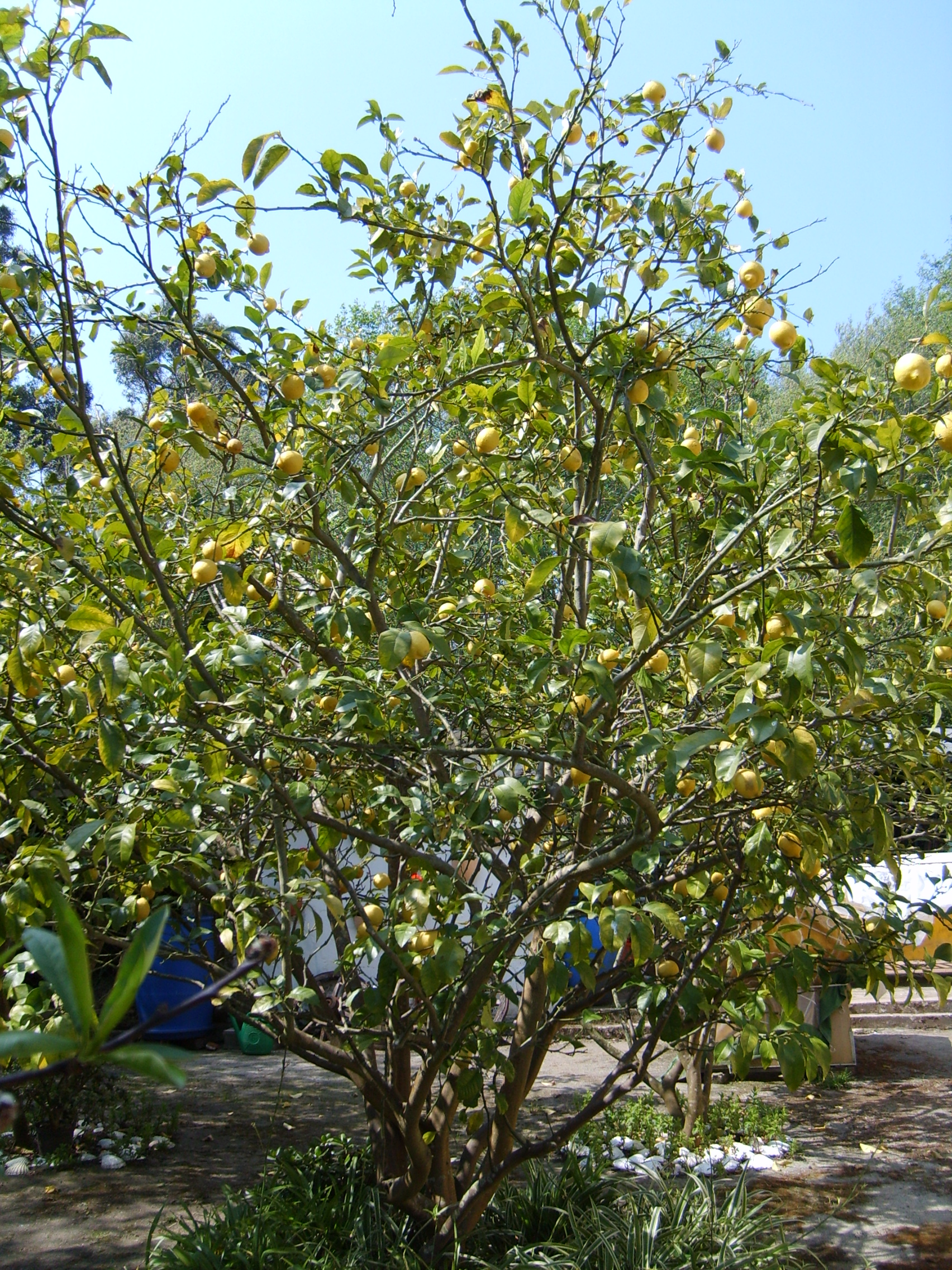
Full-sized tree

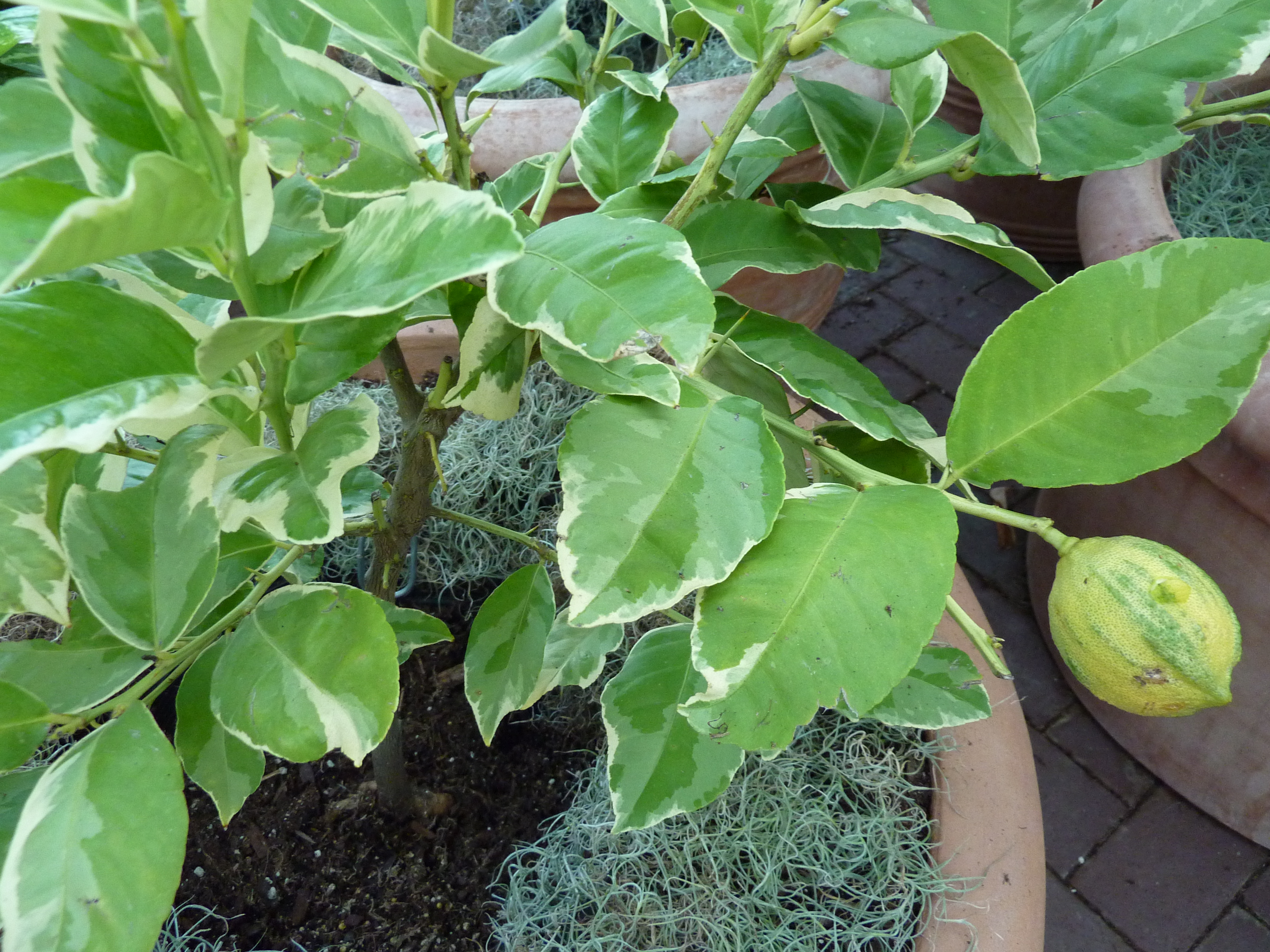
Variegated pink lemon
