= Corona Founders Monument =

California Historic Landmark

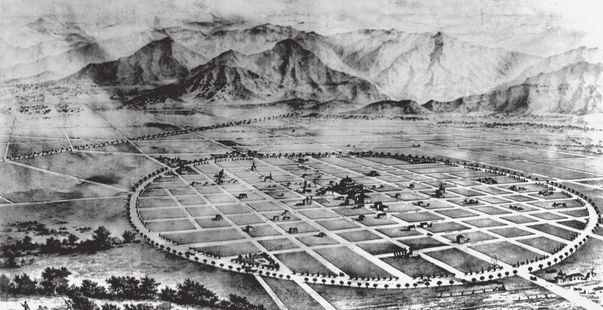
- South Riverside - Corona California in 1887

- Location within California Location within the United States
- 33°52′30″N 117°33′21″W
- Location: near Corona, California

History
- Built: 1936

California Historical Landmark
- Designated: June 6, 1960
- Reference no.: 738

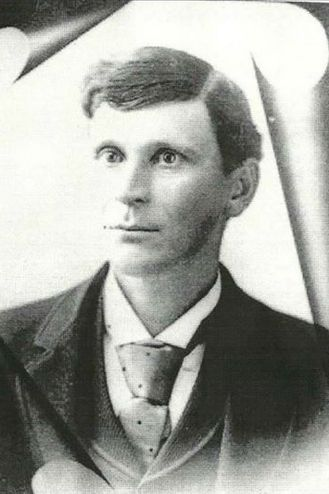
Founder: Robert B. Taylor

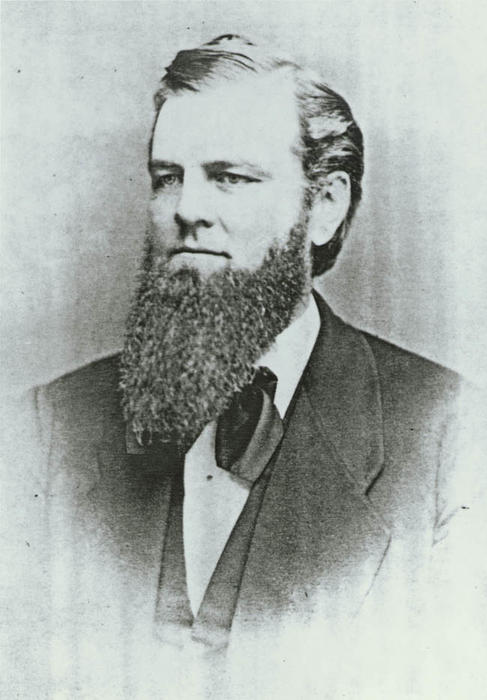
Founder: George . Joy

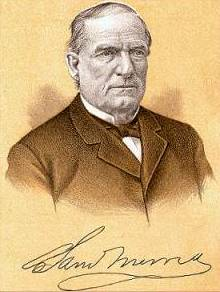
Founder: Samuel Merrill

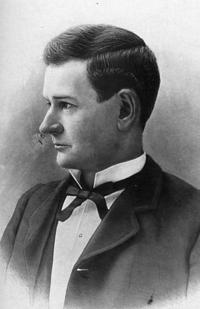
Founder: A.S. Garretson

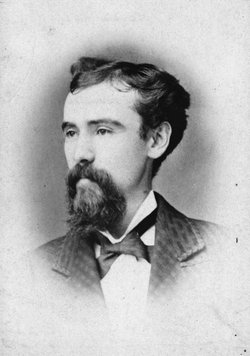
Adolph Rimpau

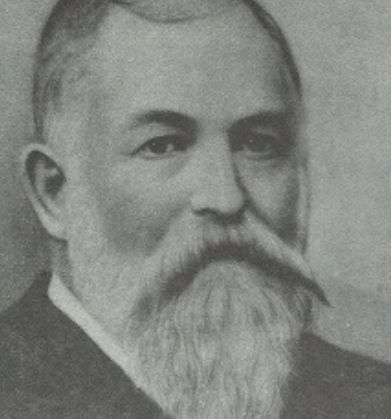
H.C. Kellogg, Chief civil engineer

The Corona Founders Monument is a monument built in 1936 to the founding fathers of the City of Corona in Riverside County, California. The monument was designated a California Historic Landmark (No.738) on June 6, 1960. The monument is in the Corona City Park in the 100 block of 6th Street of Corona, California. The founding fathers at first called the city South Riverside after the company they started the South Riverside Land and Water Company.

The founding fathers of the City of Corona on May 4, 1886, bought land from the Rancho La Sierra and the Rancho Temescal Mexican land grants. On this land the founding fathers planted orange trees and lemon trees. By 1912 Corona have 5,000 acres of lemon, orange, grapefruit, limes and tangerines groves. With the groves came packing and processing plants. In Corona about 80% of all job were in the citrus industry. The citrus industry continued in Corona into the 1980s. Corona had the title of Lemon Capital of the World, but lost it to Ventura County, California. Corona Heritage Park & Museum at 510 W Foothill Parkway, Corona, California had displays about the Corona citrus industry. On July 13, 1896, South Riverside incorporate and changed the city name to Corona. Corona is Spanish for “Crown”. H.C. Kellogg laid the city out in a one-mile diameter circle in 1887, with Grand Boulevard three miles around it. To the North of the circle was a railroad station and citrus packing houses. To the South acres of citrus groves of what was called "Queen Colony'.

On May 4, 1886, for $110,000 they started the South Riverside Land and Water Company with the purchase of:

- From Rancho La Sierra 11,5100 acres from the Yorba family.
- From Rancho Temescal 5,000 acres from the Serrano family.

Counting for inflation, $110,000 in 1886 has the same purchasing power as $3,942,914.89 in 2026 (USD).

== Founding fathers ==
The founding fathers of South Riverside - City of Corona are:

- R. B. Taylor - Robert B. Taylor (1849–1940) Born in Millbrook, Ohio, married Emma S. Mason in 1873, came to California in 1886. Hired H.C. Kellogg. Donated land for the all cities churches.
- George L. Joy (1832–1896)- Born in Vermont, lived in St. Louis for a while, president Sioux National Bank, came to Corona in 1887 with wife Ella, president of South Riverside for 3 years, Vice president of Citizens Bank, helped build the First Baptist Church in 1894, grew oranges, Leader of the founders from Iowa.
- Samuel Merrill (1822–1899) - Born in Maine, a civil war veteran from Iowa 21st Infantry, 7th Governor of Iowa, also a founder of the City of Rialto.
- A. S. Garretson - a Sioux City banker-Sioux National Bank, VP Sioux Rail, part owner of the Sioux City Boston Block and Peavey Grand Opera House. Built the fancy large 5 story Temescal Hotel. Lost much in the financial crash of 1893.
- Adolph Rimpau (1857–1916)- Married Natalia Carrillo in 1875, native Californian, with brother Fred Rimpau owned Rimpau Estate Company. Pioneer of Anaheim, California also.

=== H.C. Kellogg ===
H.C. Kellogg (1855–1921) South Riverside's chief civil engineer, architect and construction builder. Born in Napa Valley, California, parents were pioneers in Illinois. Parents and family move to Anaheim, California in 1869 to farm land. Attended Wilson College, California, coed opened by Benjamin Davis Wilson and the Methodist Church, start in 1874 at Drum Barracks, closed in 1877 and reopened in 1880, later became as University of Southern California. Graduating as a civil engineer and worked in Anaheim. Became member of the Anaheim Union Water Company till 1921. IN 1885 became Deputy County Surveyor of Los Angeles County. In 1886 became working on design of South Riverside, the unique "Circle City". Next he worked on the Gila River Dam in Arizona. Then he became the City Engineer of Santa Ana. Then worked in Hawaiian Islands, he then returned and worked back in Corona in 1908.

== Marker ==
Marker in the City of Corona, California site reads:

- R. B. Taylor, George L. Joy, Samuel Merrill, A. S. Garretson, and Adolph Rimpau, after purchasing lands of La Sierra Rancho and El Temescal grant, founded the citrus colony and town of Corona on May 4, 1886.

== See also ==
- California Historical Landmarks in Riverside County, California
- List of California Ranchos
- Ranchos of Los Angeles County, California
- Temescal Valley (California)
- Temescal Creek (Riverside County)
- Santa Ana Mountains
- List of tributaries of the Santa Ana River
