= Pochea =

California Historic Landmark

Pochea Indian village site
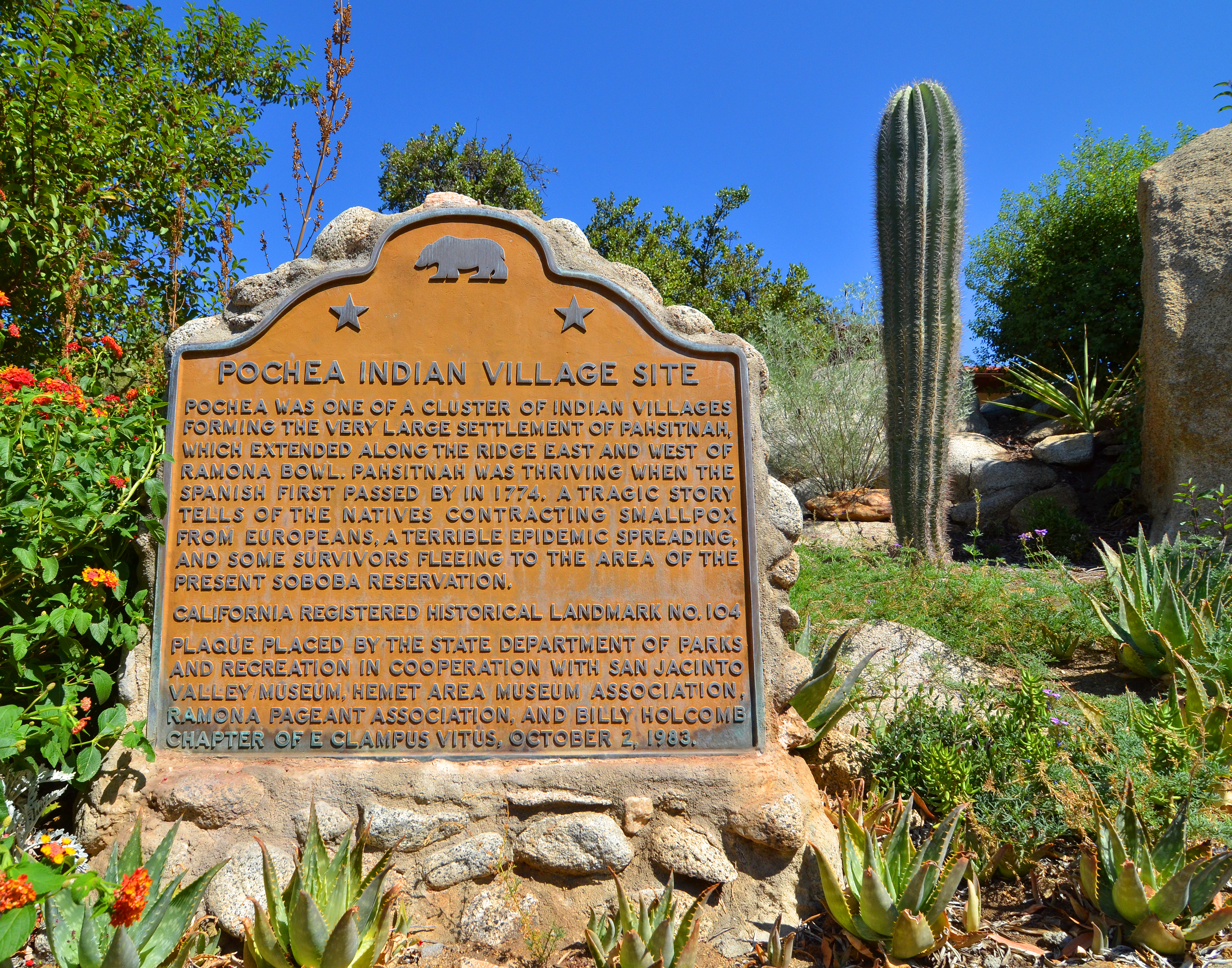
- Pochea Indian village site marker

- Location within California
- 33°43′12″N 116°56′58″W
- Location: Ramona Bowl, 27400 S Girard Street, Hemet, California

History
- Built: Prehistory – outbreak 1774

California Historical Landmark
- Designated: March 29, 1933
- Reference no.: 104

The Pochea Indian village site was the home of the Pochea Indians in what is now Hemet, California in Riverside County, California. The Pochea Indian village site was designated a California Historic Landmark (No.104) on March 29, 1933. The site of the Pochea Indian village is currently at the Ramona Bowl at 27400 Ramona Bowl, Hemet, California. The Pochea Indians lived in a small groups. These groups made up the indigenous peoples of California group called Pahsitnah.

In 1774 the Juan Bautista de Anza expedition stopped at the Pochea Indian village during the expedition. Someone in the expedition had smallpox that was passed to a Pochea member. A smallpox epidemic broke out and spread. Those that did not die moved to the present day Soboba Reservation, home of the Soboba Band of Luiseno Indians.

Juan Bautista de Anza was the leader of an exploratory expedition on January 8, 1774, with 3 padres, 20 soldiers, 11 servants, 35 mules, 65 cattle, and 140 horses set forth from Tubac south of present-day Tucson, Arizona. They went across the Sonoran desert to California from Mexico by swinging south of the Gila River to avoid Apache attacks until they hit the Colorado River at the Yuma Crossing—about the only way across the Colorado River. The friendly Quechan (Yuma) Indians (2–3,000) he encountered there were growing most of their food, using irrigation systems, and had already imported pottery, horses, wheat and a few other crops from New Mexico.

After crossing the Colorado to avoid the impassable Algodones Dunes west of Yuma, Arizona, they followed the river about 50 miles (80 km) south (to about the Arizona's southwest corner on the Colorado River) before turning northwest to about today's Mexicali, Mexico and then turning north through today's Imperial Valley and then northwest again before reaching Mission San Gabriel Arcángel near the future city of Los Angeles, California. It took Anza about 74 days to do this initial reconnaissance trip to establish a land route into California. On his return trip he went down the Gila River until hitting the Santa Cruz River (Arizona) and continuing on to Tubac. The return trip only took 23 days, and he encountered several peaceful and populous agricultural tribes with irrigation systems located along the Gila River.

== Marker ==
Marker at Pochea Indian village site reads:

- NO. 104 SITE OF INDIAN VILLAGE OF POCHEA – Pochea was one of a cluster of Indian villages forming the very large settlement of Pahsitnah, which extended along the ridge east and west of Ramona Bowl. Pahsitnah was thriving when the Spanish first passed by in 1774. A tragic story tells of the natives contracting smallpox from Europeans, a terrible epidemic spreading, and some survivors fleeing to the area of the present Soboba Reservation.

== See also ==
- California Historical Landmarks in Riverside County, California
