= Temescal Valley, California =

Temescal Valley
- Census-designated place
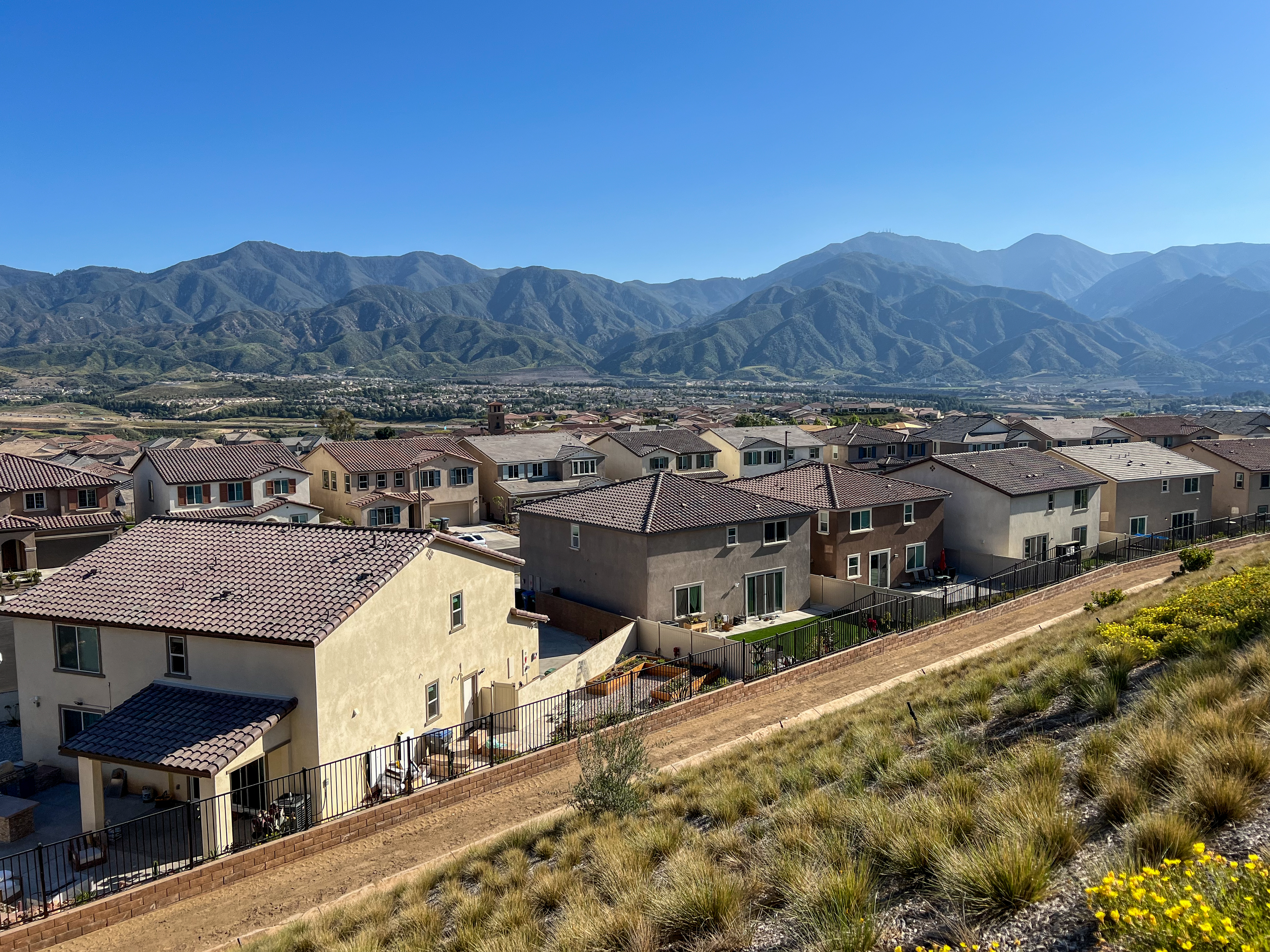
- Temescal Valley homes with Santa Ana Mountains in the background
- Interactive map of Temescal Valley
- Location in California
- Coordinates: 33°45′28″N 117°28′03″W
- Country: United States
- State: California
- County: Riverside

Area
  - Total: 19.377 sq mi (50.186 km^{2})
  - Land: 19.341 sq mi (50.094 km^{2})
  - Water: 0.036 sq mi (0.092 km^{2}) 0.18%
- Elevation: 1,138 ft (347 m)

Population (2020)
  - Total: 26,232
  - Density: 1,356.3/sq mi (523.66/km^{2})
- Time zone: UTC-8 (Pacific (PST))
  - Summer (DST): UTC-7 (PDT)
- GNIS feature ID: 2629134

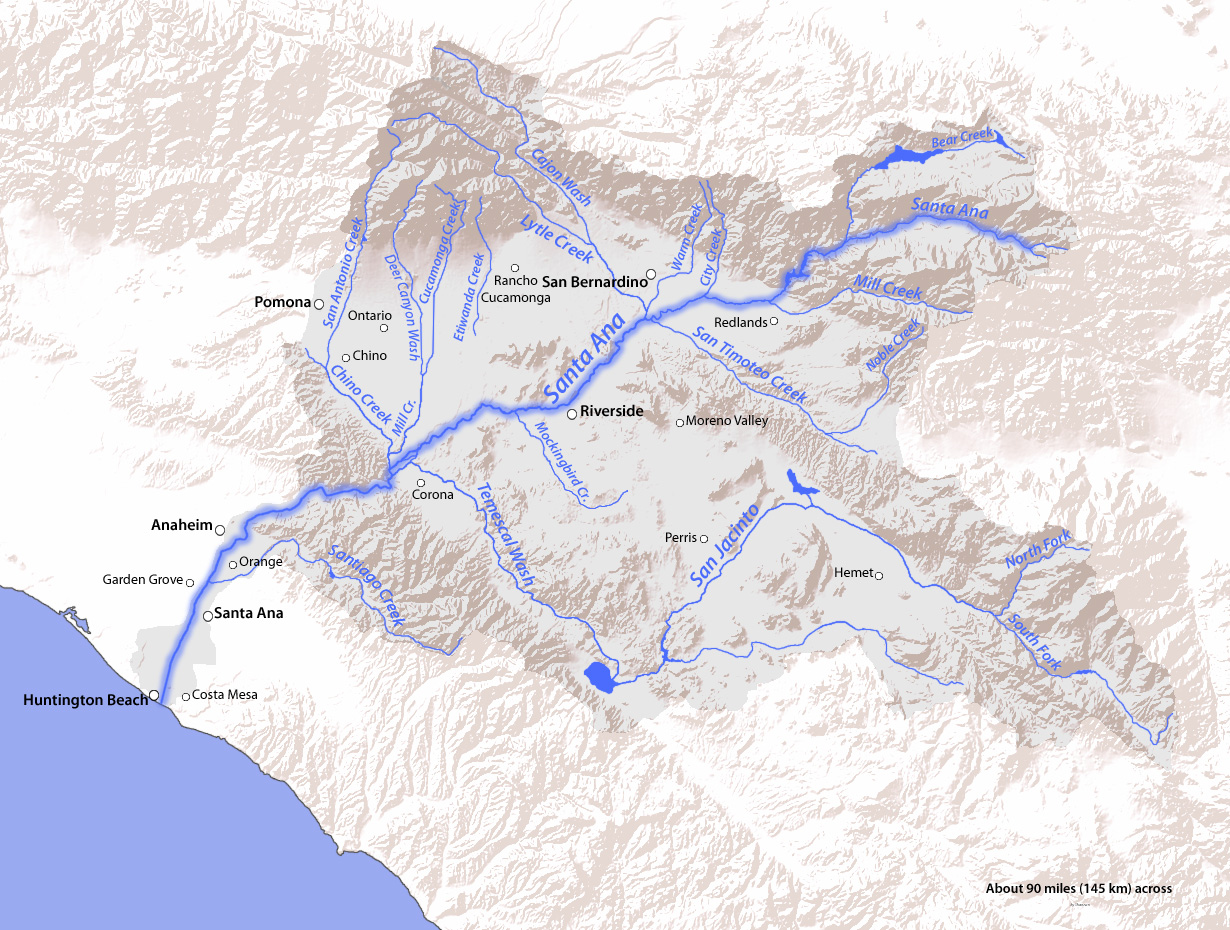
map with Temescal Valley, California

Temescal Valley (Temescal, Spanish for "sweat lodge") is a census-designated place in the Inland Empire region of Riverside County, California. Temescal Valley sits at an elevation of 1,138 feet (347 m). The 2020 United States census reported Temescal Valley's population was 26,232.

== History ==
=== Rancho Temescal ===
Temescal Valley takes its name from the Rancho Temescal established by Leandro Serrano. Serrano received the written permission of the priest of the Mission San Luis Rey de Francia, or of the military commander of San Diego, to occupy the five square league Rancho Temescal on land belonging to Mission of San Luis Rey. He took possession in about 1818 or 1819 under a grant given by Governor José María de Echeandía to Leandro Serrano. The Serrano Boulder (California Historical Landmark (#185), marks the site of the first house erected by Leandro Serrano about May 1824. The grant extended along the Temescal Valley south of present-day Corona and encompassed El Cerrito and Lee Lake. The Serrano family held the land until they lost the court case validating their title to the land in 1866. Meanwhile, squatters settled on the land in anticipation of this result in 1855.

=== Temescal ===
==== Temescal Station and Settlement ====
In 1857, the Temescal Station of the Butterfield Overland Mail stage line was established five miles north of the Temescal Hot Springs, ten miles north of Rancho La Laguna station and twenty miles south of the Chino Rancho station. The Temescal Overland station was "at the foot of the Temescal hills, a splendid place to camp, wood and water plenty, and protected from the winds." Around this location the settlement of Temescal grew over the next few decades. By 1860, Greenwade's Place in Temescal Canyon, 3 miles north of the stage station, was a polling place for southwestern San Bernardino County. It was a Post Office from February 12 until November 12, 1861, when the American Civil War shut down the Butterfield stage operations.

In 1866, the Temescal School District was organized, the fifth in San Bernardino County. Its school house was built under a huge sycamore tree and served until 1889, when a new building took its place in the early 1900s. During the 1870s, orchards and bee hives began to replace cattle and sheep ranching. The bees were first brought into the valley in the early seventies and became an important source of income in the valley. From October 29, 1874, Temescal again had its own post office.

==== Temescal Tin Mine ====
In 1856, Abel Stearns was convinced that the rancho's property contained tin ores and bought an interest in Rancho Temescal from Serrano's widow for 200 cattle. He was forced by his losses in the drought of 1863–64 to sell off his interest in the Temescal Rancho in 1864, for $100,000. The tin mine, located east of Temescal, was developed after the 1866 ruling and produced tin by 1869. However the land title remained in dispute and no more development to the mines happened until an 1888 Supreme Court ruling settled the title.

After the Supreme Court ruling, experts from England examined the tin district, and made favorable reports which encouraged the California Mining and Smelting Company to be incorporated in London, on July 24, 1890, also another corporation, the San Jacinto Estate, Limited, was formed, by prominent financiers of London, including some of the men interested in the Welsh tin mines. The Rancho San Jacinto Sobrante, on which the mine was now located, was purchased, and the Temescal Tin Mine was at last opened up operating for the next two years. Temescal grew large with the influx of the miners, enough to have its own post office. Up to July 1892, 136 tons of tin were produced; the first shipment reached New York on March 30, 1892. This was the first and last shipment; the Temescal tin mines were soon closed down in 1892, the valuable equipment and machinery were later sold and no effort has since been made to work the mine.

==== South Riverside, Corona and the decline of Temescal ====
In May 1886, the South Riverside Land and Water Company was incorporated, its members including ex-Governor of Iowa Samuel Merrill, R. B. Taylor, George L. Joy, A. S. Garretson, and Adolph Rimpau; as a citrus growers' organization, it purchased the lands of Rancho La Sierra of Bernardo Yorba, and the Rancho Temescal grant and the colony of South Riverside was laid out. They also secured the water rights to Temescal Creek, its tributaries and Lee Lake. Dams and pipelines were built to carry the water to the colony. In 1889, the Temescal Water Company was incorporated, to supply water for the new colony. This company purchased all the water-bearing lands in the valley and began drilling artesian wells. The first wells flowed, at a depth of 300 feet. However, pumping plants soon had to be installed. In time, all the water of both Temescal and Coldwater Creeks was diverted into pipe lines. Cienagas and springs were drained, and, gradually, the valley became dry and desolate. Farms and orchards in the central part of the Temescal Valley were abandoned, and the old adobes along the stage route crumbled and disappeared. By November 30, 1901, the Temescal post office was closed and postal operations moved to the Corona post office.

== Geography and climate ==
According to the United States Census Bureau, the CDP covers an area of 19.3 square miles (50.1 km^{2}), 99.82% of it land and 0.18% of it water.

Climate data for Temescal Valley, California
Month	Jan	Feb	Mar	Apr	May	Jun	Jul	Aug	Sep	Oct	Nov	Dec	Year
Record high °F (°C)	85 (29)	86 (30)	90 (32)	95 (35)	103 (39)	108 (42)	108 (42)	110 (43)	114 (46)	102 (39)	93 (34)	82 (28)	114 (46)
Mean daily maximum °F (°C)	63 (17)	65 (18)	67 (19)	73 (23)	79 (26)	87 (31)	94 (34)	95 (35)	89 (32)	80 (27)	70 (21)	63 (17)	77 (25)
Mean daily minimum °F (°C)	37 (3)	38 (3)	40 (4)	43 (6)	48 (9)	53 (12)	57 (14)	58 (14)	55 (13)	48 (9)	40 (4)	36 (2)	46 (8)
Record low °F (°C)	24 (−4)	22 (−6)	24 (−4)	28 (−2)	38 (3)	39 (4)	46 (8)	46 (8)	42 (6)	32 (0)	28 (−2)	23 (−5)	22 (−6)
Average precipitation inches (mm)	3.42 (87)	3.52 (89)	2.52 (64)	0.83 (21)	0.28 (7.1)	0.06 (1.5)	0.03 (0.76)	0.24 (6.1)	0.30 (7.6)	0.41 (10)	1.22 (31)	1.94 (49)	14.77 (375)

== Demographics ==
Historical population
Census	Pop.	Note	%±
2010	22,535		—
2020	26,232		16.4%
U.S. Decennial Census; 1860–1870 1880-1890; 1900 1910 1920; 1930 1940 1950; 1960 1970 1980; 1990 2000 2010

Temescal Valley first appeared as a census designated place in the 2010 U.S. census.

=== Racial and ethnic composition ===
Temescal Valley CDP, California – Racial and ethnic composition Note: the US Census treats Hispanic/Latino as an ethnic category. This table excludes Latinos from the racial categories and assigns them to a separate category. Hispanics/Latinos may be of any race.
Race / Ethnicity (NH = Non-Hispanic)	Pop 2010	Pop 2020	% 2010	% 2020
White alone (NH)	11,380	10,778	50.50%	41.09%
Black or African American alone (NH)	1,446	1,988	6.42%	7.58%
Native American or Alaska Native alone (NH)	53	62	0.24%	0.24%
Asian alone (NH)	2,107	2,861	9.35%	10.91%
Native Hawaiian or Pacific Islander alone (NH)	61	47	0.27%	0.18%
Other race alone (NH)	25	168	0.11%	0.64%
Mixed race or Multiracial (NH)	710	1,257	3.15%	4.79%
Hispanic or Latino (any race)	6,753	9,071	29.97%	34.58%
Total	22,535	26,232	100.00%	100.00%

=== 2020 census ===
As of the 2020 census, Temescal Valley had a population of 26,232. The population density was 1,356.3 inhabitants per square mile (523.7/km^{2}). The census reported that 99.97% of residents lived in households, 8 people (0.03%) lived in non-institutionalized group quarters, and none were institutionalized. 95.2% of residents lived in urban areas, while 4.8% lived in rural areas.

The median age was 39.7 years; 25.6% of residents were under the age of 18 and 16.1% were 65 years of age or older. For every 100 females there were 94.7 males, and for every 100 females age 18 and over there were 91.2 males age 18 and over.

There were 8,248 households, of which 41.5% had children under the age of 18 living in them. Of all households, 66.9% were married-couple households, 4.9% were cohabiting couple households, 18.3% had a female householder with no spouse or partner present, and 9.9% had a male householder with no spouse or partner present. About 13.2% of all households were made up of individuals and 7.5% had someone living alone who was 65 years of age or older; the average household size was 3.18. There were 6,868 families (83.3% of all households).

There were 8,475 housing units at an average density of 438.2 units per square mile (169.2 units/km^{2}), of which 8,248 (97.3%) were occupied. Of the occupied units, 86.5% were owner-occupied and 13.5% were occupied by renters. The homeowner vacancy rate was 1.1% and the rental vacancy rate was 2.1%.

Racial composition as of the 2020 census
Race	Number	Percent
White	12,633	48.2%
Black or African American	2,077	7.9%
American Indian and Alaska Native	255	1.0%
Asian	2,951	11.2%
Native Hawaiian and Other Pacific Islander	56	0.2%
Some other race	3,477	13.3%
Two or more races	4,783	18.2%

== Education ==
Most of it is in the Corona-Norco Unified School District. A portion is in the Lake Elsinore Unified School District.
