= Mirror Building =

California historic landmark

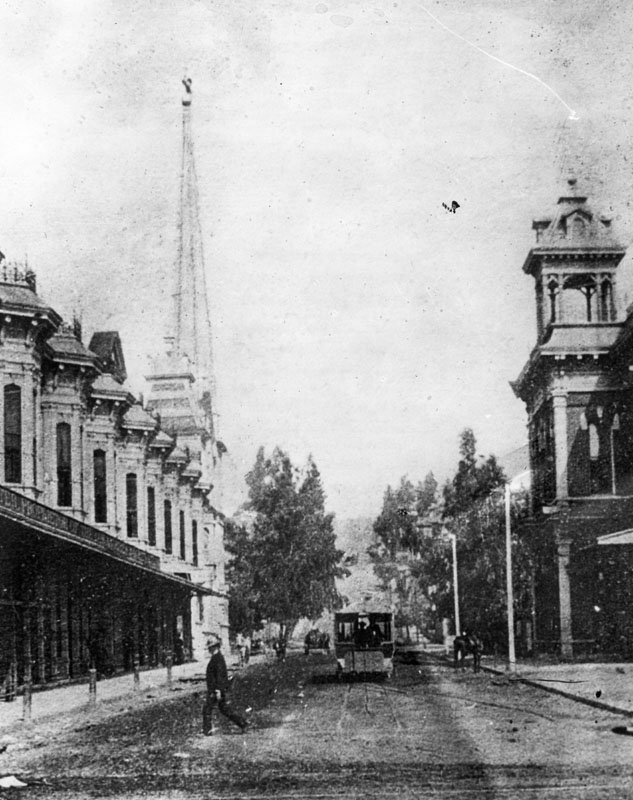
- Second Street Mirror Building on the right in 1886

- Location within the Los Angeles metropolitan area
- 34°03′07″N 118°14′43″W
- Location: Second Street and 145 S Spring St, Los Angeles, California, U.S.

History
- Built: 1858

California Historical Landmark
- Designated: July 05, 1960
- Reference no.: 744

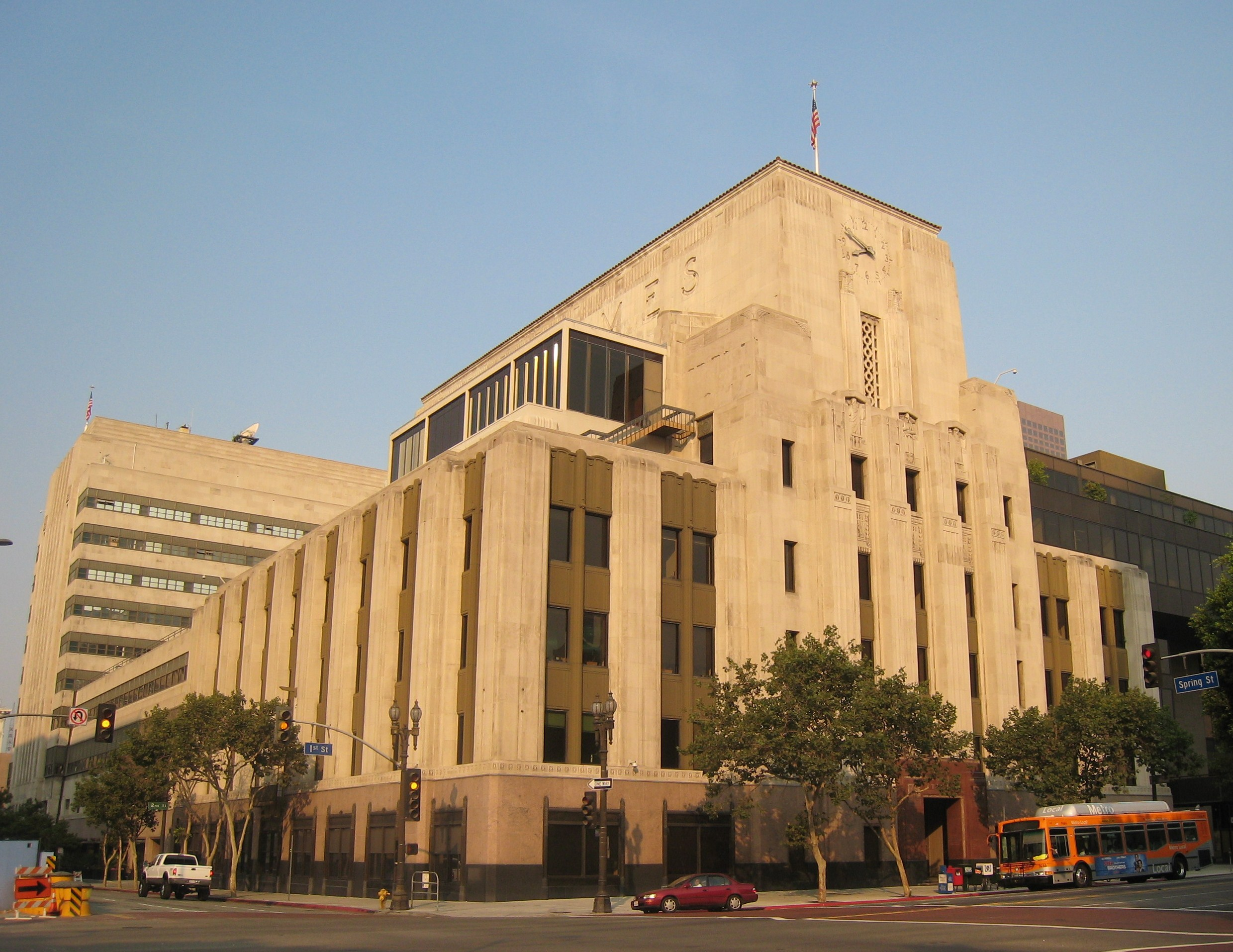
The LA Times Building in 1935 on the site of the former Mirror Building

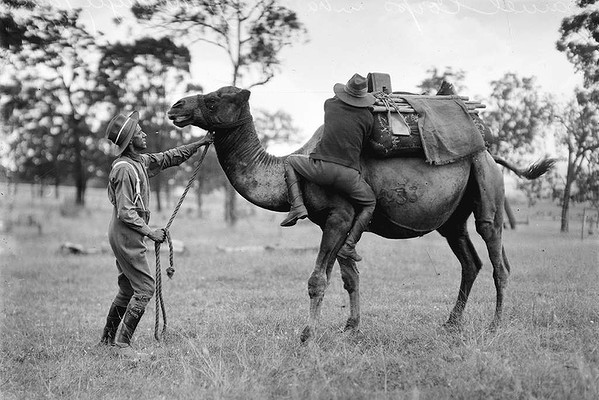
Office of U.S. Quartermaster, Army Camel Corps training

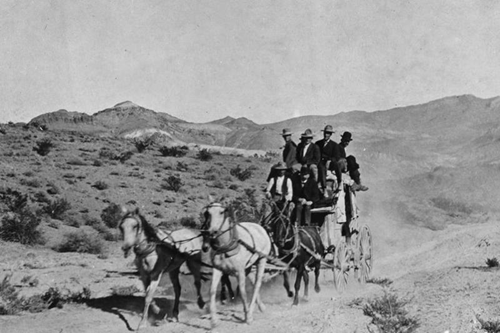
Butterfield Stage in 1860

The Mirror Building also called the Butterfield Overland Mail Company Los Angeles Building was a large brick building in Los Angeles built by Butterfield Overland Mail Company in 1858. The Mirror Building was designated a California Historic Landmark (No.744) on July 5, 1960. The Mirror Building had business offices and housing space for traveling workers. There was a large stable in the back of the buildings for the horses, along with a large workshop to repair the stagecoaches. The first Butterfield Overland Mail stagecoach from St. Louis to arrive was on October 7, 1858. The Butterfield Overland Mail Company was founded by John Butterfield, who later founded American Express.

While the Mirror Building was being built the Butterfield Overland Mail Company rented space from the Bella Union Hotel. The Los Angeles Butterfield Overland Mail Company closed in 1861.

In 1861, the Mirror Building became the Office of U.S. Quartermaster. The U.S. Quartermaster use the stable for army horses and mules. The stable also had space to support the camels used at Fort Tejon and other west outpost. From 1858, Fort Tejon was the western terminus of the experimental U.S. Camel Corps, which used imported camels in an effort to carry supplies across arid regions in the Southwest. The soldiers found the camels hardy, but temperamental, and they spooked the horses used by the cavalry.

From 1884 to 1888, the Mirror Building was used as Los Angeles City Hall. The site of the former Mirror Building is now Los Angeles Times building at 202 West 1st Street built in 1935. The current Times Building has a small museum about the Mirror Building and other offices that were on the site, located at 125 South Spring Street. The 1947 New Times Building, is sometimes called Mirror Building due to the site of the original Mirror Building.

The Mirror Building received its name later from the Mirror Printing Office and Book Bindery. Mirror Printing Office became the owners of Los Angeles Daily Times in 1882.

The downtown Los Angeles block that the Mirror Building was on is also the location of the Los Angeles School No. 1 built in 1855. This was the first brick school house in Los Angeles. The School was paid for by the new California education property tax assessment started in 1852, which gave schools five cents per $100 of taxable property value. The school was at the northwest corner of Spring and Second streets and cost $6,000 to build. The two story School opened on March 19, 1855.

Route divisions of Butterfield Overland Mail route
Division	Route	Miles	Hours
Division 1	San Francisco to Los Angeles	462	80
Division 2	Los Angeles to Fort Yuma	282	72.20

== Markers ==
- State Marker on the site reads (The historical plaque is located around the on Second Street. ):
- NO. 744 THE MIRROR BUILDING (SITE OF BUTTERFIELD STAGE STATION) – The Butterfield Overland Mail Company took an option on this piece of property in August 1858 and acquired it on December 7, 1859. A large brick building containing offices and living quarters, with shops and stables in the rear, was completed in 1860. With the exception of the station at El Paso, Texas, this was the largest and best equipped station on the entire route."
- A 1949 marker placed the by Native Daughters of the Golden West reads:

This block is the site of:
First brick school house in Los Angeles known as School No. 1, built 1854–1855;
Butterfield Overland Mail Company office and corral, 1858–1861;
Office of U.S. Quartermaster, 1861;
Corral for camels from Fort Tejon, 1861;
and Los Angeles City Hall, built 1884.

== See also ==
- California Historical Landmarks in Los Angeles County
- List of California Ranchos
- Ranchos of Los Angeles County, California
- Times Mirror Company
- Butterfield Overland Mail in California
- Stockton - Los Angeles Road
- Central Business District, Los Angeles (1880s-1890s)
- Temescal Butterfield stage station
- Los Angeles Times building
