= Boston Block =

- U.S. National Register of Historic Places
- U.S. Historic district – Contributing property
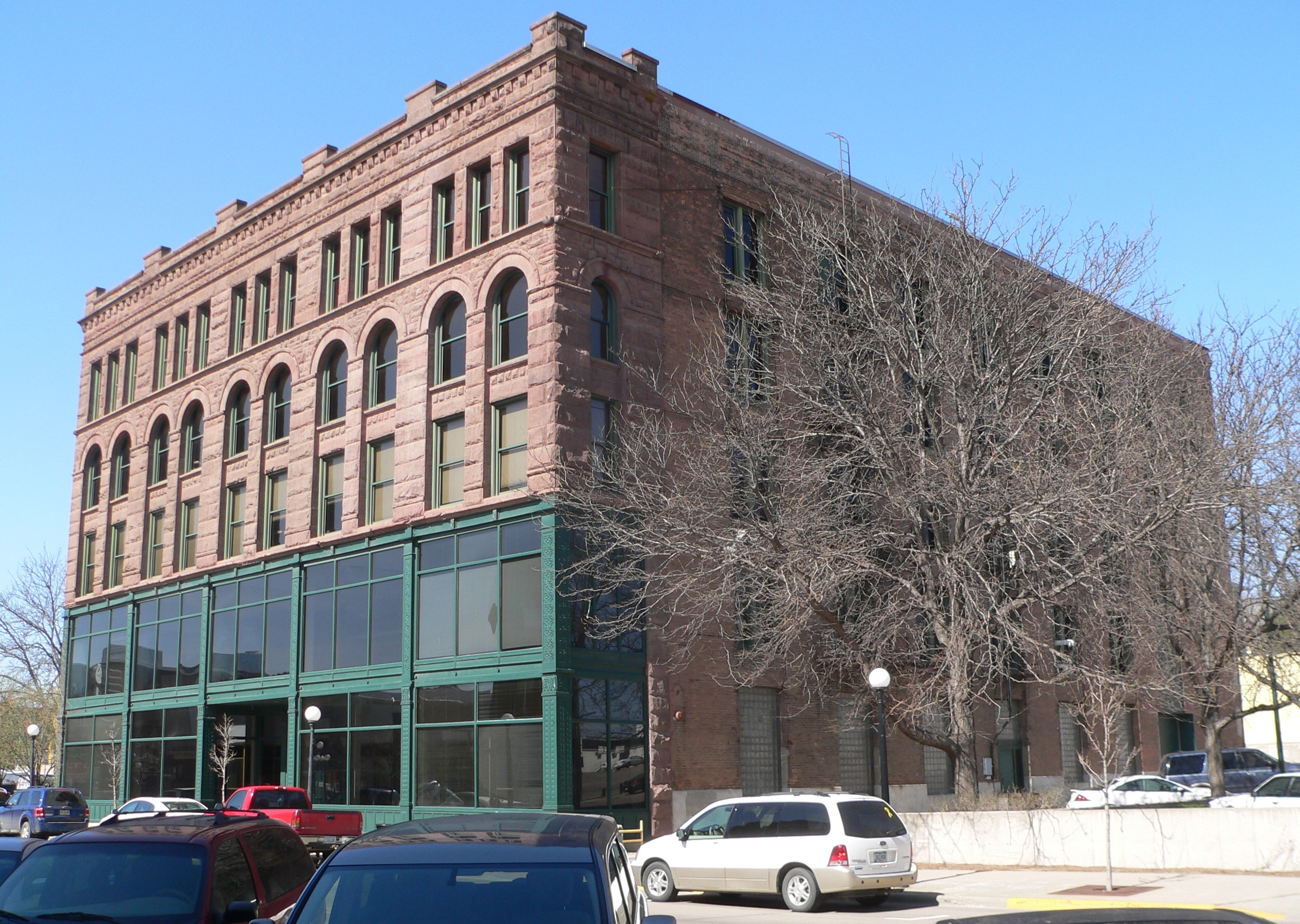

- Location within Iowa Location within the United States
- Location: 1005-1013 E. 4th St. Sioux City, Iowa
- Coordinates: 42°29′40.2″N 96°23′50.4″W
- Area: less than one acre
- Built: 1890-1891
- Architect: John G. Mainland (Supervising Architect)
- Architectural style: Romanesque Revival
- Part of: Fourth Street Historic District (ID95000966)
- NRHP reference No.: 85000010
- Added to NRHP: January 3, 1985

The Boston Block, also known as Aalfs Manufacturing Company, is a historic building located in Sioux City, Iowa, United States. The city experienced a building boom that began in the late 1880s and continued into the early 1890s. One of the major players in that building boom was the Boston Investment Company, a company on the East Coast who built four large commercial blocks in Sioux City simultaneously. Construction on the four buildings began in 1890 and they were completed the following year. In addition to the commercial blocks, they also built a steam heating plant that provided steam and light to three of the buildings as well as to neighboring buildings. The Massachusetts Block (no longer extant) on the southwest corner of Fourth and Jackson was six stories tall and had a similar facade as the Boston Block, which is five stories tall on the northeast corner of Fourth and Virginia. The Plymouth Block on the southeast corner of Fourth and Locust was also five stories tall, and the Bay State Block on Fourth Street is the shortest at four stories. Among the building's tenants was the Aalfs Manufacturing Company, which used the building as its headquarters.

The architect of the four buildings is unknown, but John G. Mainland served as supervising architect. The Boston Block is a Richardsonian Romanesque structure that features rusticated stone veneer with a two-story iron and glass storefront. The original storefront was extensively altered in 1948, and it was altered again in 1984. The building was individually listed on the National Register of Historic Places in 1985, and as a contributing property in the Fourth Street Historic District in 1995.
