= Fourth Street Historic District (Sioux City, Iowa) =

Historic district in Iowa, United States

- U.S. National Register of Historic Places
- U.S. Historic district
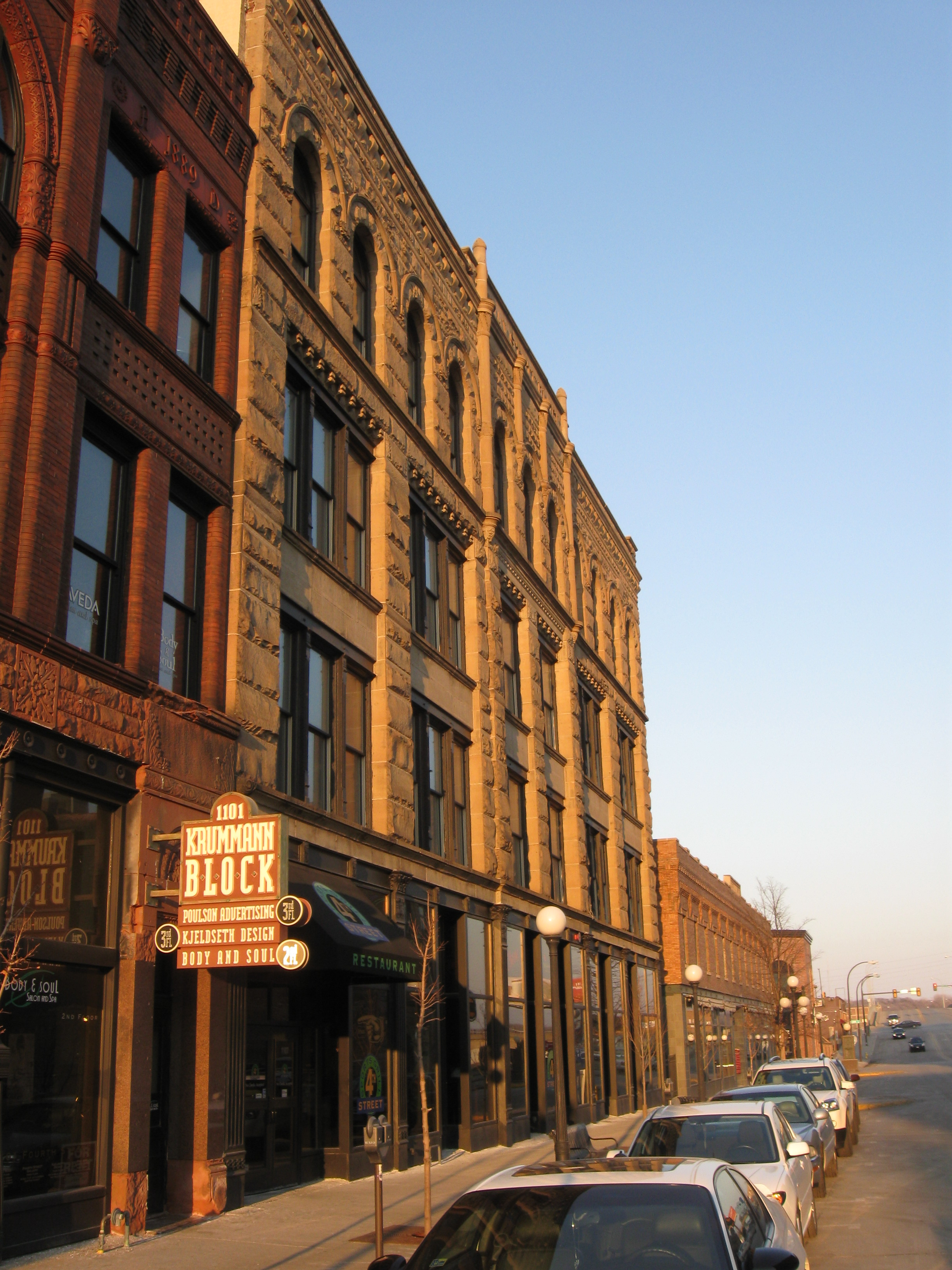

- Location within Iowa Location within the United States
- Location: 1002--1128 Fourth St., Sioux City, Iowa
- Coordinates: 42°29′39″N 96°23′46″W
- Built: 1889
- Architect: Charles P. Brown; E. W. Loft et al.
- Architectural style: Romanesque
- NRHP reference No.: 95000966
- Added to NRHP: August 15, 1995

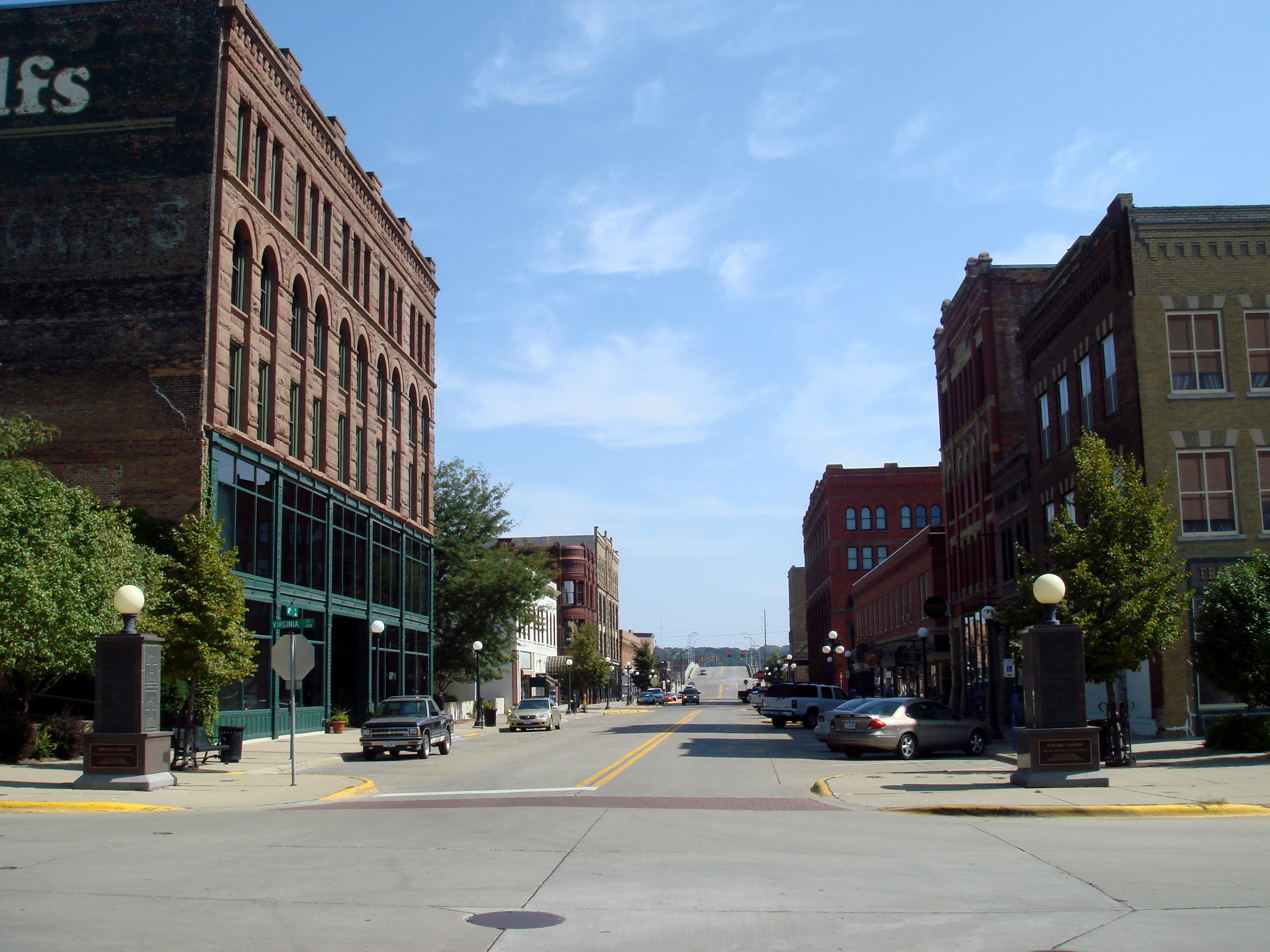
Fourth Street, facing east.

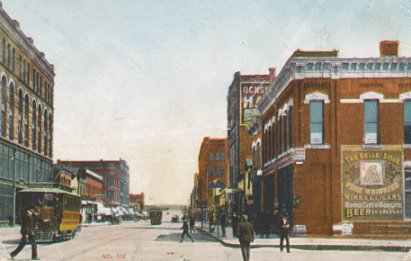
Sioux City at the start of the 1900s; 4th Street, looking east from Virginia

The Fourth Street Historic District is a historic district in Sioux City, Iowa, United States. It consists of a concentration of fifteen late-nineteenth-century commercial buildings between Virginia and Iowa Streets that date from 1889 to approximately 1915. Many of the buildings are significant for their elaborate Romanesque Revival architecture. The area is now a local center of restaurants, bars, and specialty shops.
