= Martha McLean – Anza Narrows =

Regional park in California, United States

Martha McLean - Anza Narrows
- Interactive map of Martha McLean - Anza Narrows
- Type: Public park
- Location: 5759 Jurupa Ave; Riverside, California
- Coordinates: 33.96281°N 117.42840°W
- Area: 40 acres (160,000 m^{2})
- Created: 1990; 36 years ago
- Operator: City of Riverside - Parks Recreation and Community Services Department
- Status: Open all year
- Website: https://www.riversideca.gov/park_rec/parks-map

Martha McLean – Anza Narrows is a 40-acre (0.16 km^{2}; 0.063 sq mi) regional park located along the Santa Ana River in Riverside, California, United States. The park is operated by the City of Riverside - Parks Recreation and Community Services Department. A plaque in the northwest corner of the park marks the point at which the Juan Bautista de Anza party, the first Europeans to traverse the Riverside area, crossed the river in 1774 and again in 1776.

== History ==
The park was named for Martha McLean, an activist who worked with her friend Ruth Anderson to save the Santa Ana River from being channelized, as proposed by the US Army Corps of Engineers in the 1960s.

The park is located at a section of the Santa Ana River referred to as the Anza Narrows, in reference to the crossing point where the Juan Bautista de Anza Expedition crossed the river in 1774 and 1776. A marker in the park commemorates the crossing, which is part of the Juan Bautista de Anza National Historic Trail that stretches across Southern California.

== Amenities ==
The park contains picnic facilities, hiking, bicycle and equestrian trails as well as an eighteen-hole disc golf course. Group picnicking with reservations is available. The 40-acre (160,000 m^{2}) park sits atop a shady bluff along the Santa Ana River with sweeping views of the river.

The landscape, which includes a mix of shaded picnic areas and open turf, terminated at the bluffs that drop to the river.
