= Temescal Butterfield stage station =

Blythe Intake
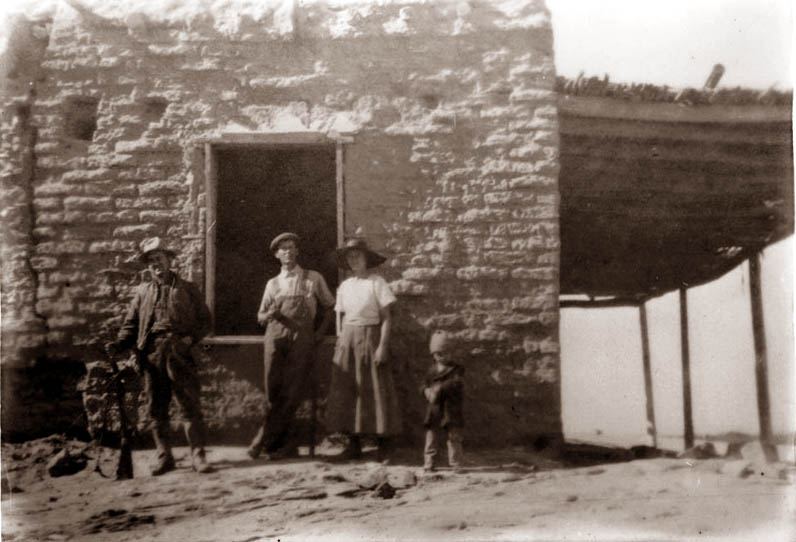
- Butterfield stage station Corona in 1860

- Location within California
- 33°48′59″N 117°30′31″W
- Location: 20730 Temescal Canyon Rd, Corona, California

History
- Built: 1858

California Historical Landmark
- Designated: June 20, 1935
- Reference no.: 188

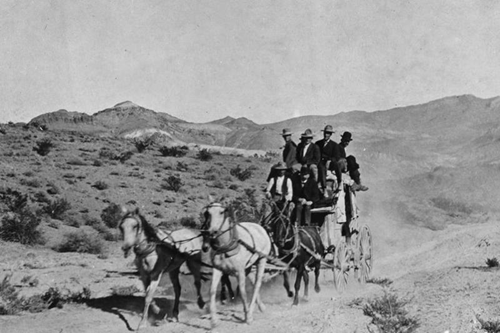
Butterfield Stage Stop Temecula in 1860

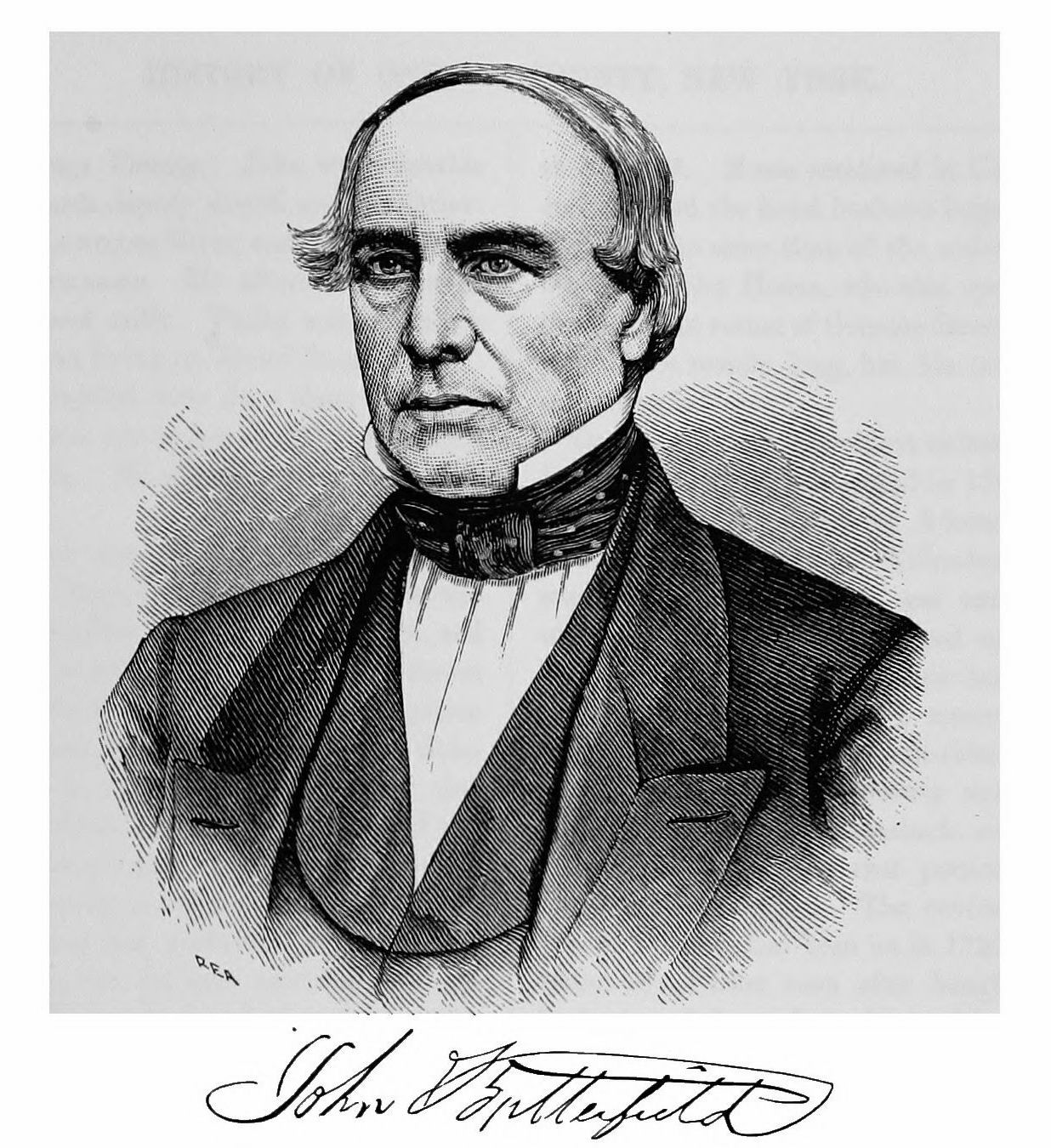
Butterfield and his signature

The Temescal Butterfield stage station is the site where the Butterfield Overland Mail stagecoach stopped to deliver mail and get fresh horses in what is now Riverside County, California. The Temescal Butterfield stage station was designated a California Historic Landmark (No.188) on June 20, 1935. The site of the Temescal Butterfield stage station is currently near the City of Corona along Temescal Canyon Road. The first stagecoach with mail and passengers departed Tipton, Missouri on September 15, 1858. The stagecoach stopped at the Temescal Butterfield stage station and arrived at the Butterfield Overland Mail Company Los Angeles Building on October 7, 1858. The Butterfield Overland Mail Company closed in 1861.

The Temescal Butterfield stage station was built five miles (8 km) north of the Temescal Hot Springs, ten miles (16 km) north of Rancho La Laguna station and twenty miles (32 km) south of the Chino Rancho station. The Temescal Butterfield stage station was "at the foot of the Temescal hills, a splendid place to camp, wood and water plenty, and protected from the winds." Temescal had its own post office from February 12, 1861, to November 12, 1861. Around this location, the settlement of Temescal grew over the next few decades. By 1860, Greenwade's Place at Temescal, three miles (4.8 km) north of the stage station, was a polling place for southwestern San Bernardino County. Voting irregularities there that year resulted in a court case between the candidates for a California State Assembly seat. The trial was so contentious it included the shooting of Bethel Coopwood, one of the opposing lawyers by the other in court, before the results could be determined.

== Marker ==
Marker on the site, 20730 Temescal Canyon Road, Corona, reads:

- NO. 188 BUTTERFIELD STAGE STATION - Site of Butterfield Stage Station where mail was delivered and horses changed. The first stage carrying overland mail left Tipton, Missouri on September 15, 1858 and, passing through Temescal, arrived in Los Angeles October 7, 1858.

== See also ==
- California Historical Landmarks in Riverside County, California
- List of California Ranchos
- Ranchos of Los Angeles County, California
