= Rancho La Laguna =

Mexican land grant in California

Coordinates: 33.640°N 117.350°W

Rancho La Laguna was a 13,339-acre (53.98 km^{2}) Mexican land grant in present-day Riverside County, California given in 1844 by Governor Manuel Micheltorena to Julian Manriquez. The rancho lands are included in the present day city of Lake Elsinore and Wildomar. At the time of the US Patent, Rancho Laguna was a part of San Diego County. The County of Riverside was created by the California Legislature in 1893 by taking land from both San Bernardino and San Diego Counties.

== History ==
Julian Manriquez received the land grant in 1844. His adobe ranch house lay at the north end of the west side of the lake. He sold the land to Abel Stearns in 1851.

With the cession of California to the United States following the Mexican-American War, the 1848 Treaty of Guadalupe Hidalgo provided that the land grants would be honored. As required by the Land Act of 1851, a claim for Rancho La Laguna was filed with the Public Land Commission in 1852, and the grant was patented to Abel Stearns in 1872.

Stearns subsequently sold Rancho Laguna to Augustin Machado in 1858. Augustin Machado built his house and outbuildings near the southwest corner of the Lake. From 1857 to 1861 the rancho was a stop on the Butterfield Overland Mail between Los Angeles and Fort Yuma. The old Manriquez adobe was used as the site of the stage station.

In 1862, during the American Civil War the rancho provided the site for the Union Army Camp Laguna Grande, a which was used for grazing horses. After Augustin Machado's death in 1865, his eldest son, Juan Bautista Machado inherited the property.

In 1873, all but 500 acres (2.0 km^{2}) of the rancho was sold to Charles A. Sumner, an English settler. Juan Machado retained the 500 acres (2.0 km^{2}) on the west corner of the lake where his house still stands. Sumner moved into the rancho with his wife and two children. He lived in a ranch house that was a frame building, with rooms on a verandah with a small building one hundred feet away as a kitchen.

Franklin Heald, along with Donald Graham and William Collier, purchased the Rancho Laguna from Sumner in 1883. They developed a community that was incorporated as the city of Elsinore in 1888.

== Historic sites of the Rancho ==
=== Manriquez Adobe, Laguna Grande Butterfield Stage Station site ===
The first adobe building was built on the south side of the lake and the building and the lake was described in the "Pioneer notes from the diaries of Judge Benjamin Hayes, 1849-1875" when he stayed there overnight on December 27–28, 1850 during his journey into California:

In about 15 miles reach some timber where the hills approach near, apparently the termination of the valley of Temecula, a sort of low divide over which we enter into another valley. In both these is much good soil, although in the latter more of the wiry grass and more marshy, some little evergreen oak among the hills.

Come to the Laguna, two miles from the divide. Some good young grass, great deal of elder on its banks; as we rode along frequent flocks of geese rose from the shore; many shots at them; none brought down. The water of the Laguna is saltish, the animals cannot drink it; if they could, such a sheet of fresh water here would be invaluable to the owner of this land. As we were moving along the lake, an Indian overtook us, running as if to catch up with us; said he was from Temecula and going to the mines; had a little pinole tied up in a handkerchief; spoke Spanish, seemed disposed to be communicative.

At sunset the moon rises behind the snowy peaks to the eastward and is reflected on the lake. Wild sage; the lake has evidently once, near the house, been with a much broader basin. How is it supplied with water? Clover around it. The house is a substantial adobe. A small stream seems to enter it on the east. A low range of hills nearly surrounds the lake, higher where we are encamped on the southern side. The lake valley seems to be higher than that of Temecula. ... Two or three men at this house; their wives seem to be Indians.

Road firm and good, gently ascending for a mile or more from the lake; then uneven, occasionally sandy, to Temescal.

Manriquez sold out to Abel Sterns in 1851, and in 1858 Sterns sold the rancho to Augustin Machado, just in time for Augustin Machado's Rancho La Laguna to become the site of the Laguna Grande station of the Butterfield Overland Mail stage line, 20 miles north northwest of the Temecula station and 10 miles south of the Temescal station. The station may have been the former Manriquez Adobe and was located at the site where a seven-room adobe house and an outbuilding stood until they were razed in 1964, at 32912 Macy Avenue, on the north end of the west side of the Lake. Over the years a frame addition and frame second story had been added to it and it was used as the Willard post office at the turn of the century. Today three palm trees still grow in front of the site along Macy Avenue in front of the property, now a vacant lot. The description by Benjamin Ignatius Hayes of the site of the adobe of the Manriquez rancho where he stayed overnight in January 1850, seems to match the location of this adobe.

=== Machado House ===
Juan Machado built an adobe home on the south-west side of the west corner of the lake at 15410 Grand Avenue east of the junction of Grand Avenue and Riverside Drive in Lake Elsinore. This was the home built by Juan the son of Augustin Machado, on the small piece of the rancho he retained in the western corner of the lake, after he had sold the rest to Sumner. It was later incorporated into a larger frame home but recently had been restored in its original form as a two-room adobe. This adobe is located a short distance northwest of the old Laguna Grande Station site.

On September 2, 2017 the building was destroyed by fire. In recent years, the property had been unoccupied and homeless people were rumored to be camping on the property. Civic leaders in Lake Elsinore launched a campaign to raise money for a reward for someone who provides a tip leading to the arrest and conviction of whoever was responsible for the fire that damaged the historical Machado Adobe. Funds may also be used for preservation and restoration efforts.

=== Willard, California ===
Willard is a former populated place in Riverside County, California. It was located at the west corner of Lake Elsinore. It had its own post office located in the former Laguna Butterfield Stage Station, on at 32912 Macy Avenue, from November 18, 1898, until September 30, 1902, when it was absorbed by the Elsinore post office. Willard was later incorporated into the City of Lake Elsinore. The old post office was torn down in 1964. Today three palm trees still grow in front of the site along Macy Avenue in front of the property.

The Willard Fault, part of the Elsinore Fault Zone is named for this former town.
