= Arthur Samuel Garretson =

American banker (1851–1917)

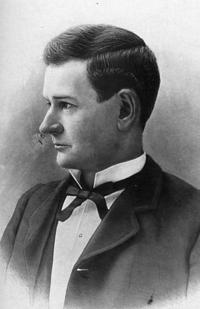
- Born: November 7, 1851; Morgan County, Ohio, U.S.
- Died: February 20, 1917 (aged 65); Vilas, South Dakota, U.S.
- Occupations: Banker, businessman, politician

Arthur Samuel Garretson (November 7, 1851 – February 20, 1917) was an American banker, businessman, and politician in Sioux City, Iowa. Garretson had a part in several major aspects of Sioux City's growth. Garretson, South Dakota, was named after him.

== Personal life ==
Garretson was born on November 7, 1851, on a farm in Morgan County, Ohio. Garretson lived in Morgan County for 17 years, and he attended school there.

He married Belle Smith in 1870, and they had eight children. The Garretsons had a mansion built in the Morningside neighborhood of Sioux City by Peter's Park, and they owned the building until 1906, when Morningside College purchased it. The Sioux City Public Library purchased the mansion in 1931 to construct it as the Morningside Branch Library. The mansion was torn down in 1967 after a vote by the Library Board, and a new building was built in its place.

== Career ==
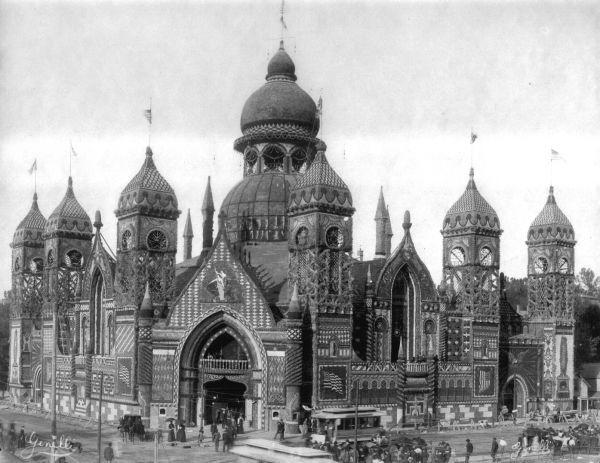
1890 Corn Palace

He moved to Taylorville, Illinois, in 1869, and worked there as a bookkeeper. In 1874, Garretson became a clerk and bookkeeper at the Sioux City Savings Bank in Sioux City, Iowa, and he worked there until 1878. He was a teller and a director at First National Bank from 1878 to 1880. Garretson founded the Sioux National Bank of which he was the cashier until 1890.

Garretson bought 1,200 farm acres, the Sioux City & Northern railway, the Pacific Short railway, factories, the Sioux City stockyard, mercantile corporations, and a California fruit farm. Garretson and four other men created the Sioux City and Northern Railway. In 1887, Garretson founded the Union Stock Yards in Sioux City with five other people. He was a Boston Investment Company organizer, and the company was an investor of over $2 million to Sioux City. Many of Sioux City's major projects were worked on by Garretson, such as the Corn Palaces, the Peavey Grand Opera House, and an elevated railway. He helped construct Garretson Hotel on Fifth and Pierce streets in Sioux City. Garretson promoted Morningside College and Sioux City's library building. He was the treasurer of Morningside College. He paid to have a train bring Boston capitalists to the 1890 Corn Palace.

Garretson became a Democratic Party candidate for Iowa's 4th congressional district in 1898. He received support from multiple prominent people including a judge and the Sioux City chief of police. Republican Gilbert N. Haugen won the election in 1899. In 1903, Garretson ran against John H. Jackson as the Democratic candidate for senator, but he lost by 34 votes. Garretson, South Dakota, was named after him.

He died at his home in Vilas, South Dakota, on February 20, 1917.
