= Temescal Valley (California) =

Graben rift valley in western Riverside County, California

Geographic Center of Temescal Valley

Temescal Valley (Temescal, Spanish for "sweat lodge") in California is a graben rift valley in western Riverside County, California, a part of the Elsinore Trough. The Elsinore Trough is a graben between the Santa Ana Mountain Block to the southwest and the Perris Block on the northeast. It is a complex graben, divided lengthwise into several smaller sections by transverse faults. The Temescal Valley is one of these grabens, at the northern end of the trough. The Temescal Valley graben is bounded on its northeast side by the Lee Lake longitudinal fault, and similarly on the southeast by the Glen Ivy Fault.

The middle reach of Temescal Creek flows through Temescal Valley from Lee Lake to its confluence with the Santa Ana River. According to the Geographic Names Information System the valley head lies just west of Lee Lake, between the Santa Ana Mountains and the Temescal Mountains to the east, and runs to the vicinity of the confluence of Temescal Creek with Brown Canyon Creek where the mountains closed in to create a narrows.

- Head of Temescal Valley 33°44′11″N 117°27′21″W
- Mouth of Temescal Valley 33°47′27″N 117°30′14″W

== See also ==
- Temescal Butterfield stage station
