= Sedco Hills =

Sedco Hills can mean:

- Sedco Hills, California, a former census-designated place (CDP) in Riverside County, California.
- Sedco Hills (California), the section of the Temescal Mountains east of Sedco Hills, California, in Riverside County, California.
