= Eagle Valley =

Eagle Valley may refer to:

- Eagle Valley, British Columbia, Shuswap, around Sicamous.
- Eagle Valley (California), Riverside County
- Eagle Valley, Colorado, in the Vail area
- Eagle Valley Township, Minnesota
- Eagle Valley (Nevada), in the Carson City area
- Eagle Valley Dam and Reservoir, Spring Valley State Park, Nevada
- Eagle Valley (Oregon), Baker County
- Eagle Valley, Pennsylvania, Jefferson County
- Valley Eagle, passenger train of Missouri Pacific Railroad (Houston-Brownsville-Mission, TX)
