= Norco =

Norco may refer to:

== Places ==
- Norco, California, U.S.
  - Norco Hills, or La Sierra Heights, section of the Temescal Mountains
- Norco, Louisiana, U.S.

== Other uses ==
- Norco Bicycles, a Canadian bicycle manufacturer
- Norco Co-operative, an agricultural supply and marketing co-operative, New South Wales, Australia
- Northern Co-operative Society (Norco), a defunct Aberdeen, Scotland co-operative society
- Norco, a brand name for the fixed-dose combination opioid pain medication hydrocodone/paracetamol
- NORCO (video game), a point-and-click video game set in a fictional version of Norco, Louisiana

== See also ==
- Norco shootout
