= Beacon Hill (California) =

Hill in California, United States

- Location within California Location within the United States

Highest point
- Elevation: 1,019 ft (311 m) NAVD 88
- Prominence: 377 ft (115 m)
- Coordinates: 33°56′04″N 117°33′39″W

Geography
- Location: Riverside County, California, U.S.
- Parent range: Temescal Mountains
- Topo map(s): USGS Corona North, CA

Geology
- Rock age: Cretaceous
- Mountain type: Granitic

Beacon Hill, formerly known as Chocolate Drop Mountain, is the tallest summit of a range of granite hills surrounding and running northeastward from Lake Norconian, at the extreme northwest of the Temescal Mountains, in Norco, California.

Rex Clark, owner of the Norconian Resort, sought to draw attention to his resort by building a 38-feet tall lighthouse with a powerful revolving light atop the hill. That beacon gave the name to that hill known today as Beacon Hill but once known as Chocolate Drop Mountain, near what is now the town center of Norco.
