= La Sierra Heights =

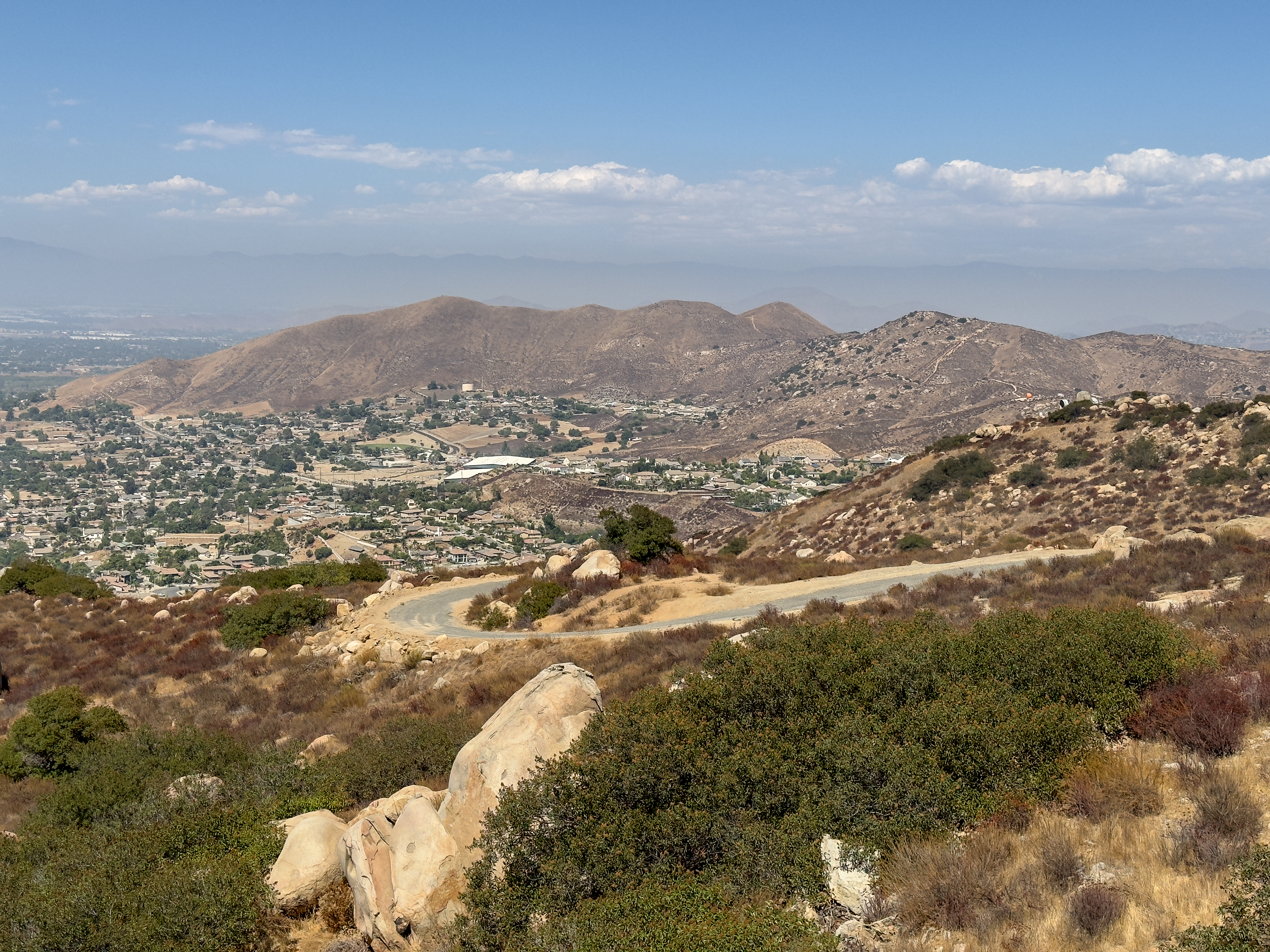
La Sierra Summit can be seen in the distance, along with a road that leads to a radio facility.

La Sierra Heights, La Sierra Hills, and Norco Hills are informal names for the northernmost section of the range known as the Temescal Mountains, located in northwestern Riverside County, California. The section begins on the south bank of the Santa Ana River and extends southward between the valleys occupied by the City of Riverside to the east and the cities of Norco and Corona to the west. A gap or portezuela connects these valleys and separates this range from Arlington Mountain and the balance of the range to the south.

These heights vary in height between the informally named La Sierra Summit, at just over 1,500 feet (460 m), to the hill at Grape Benchmark at 1,084 feet (330 m). Other summits include Hole Benchmark (1,261 feet; 384 m), Linn Benchmark (1,495 feet; 456 m), and the informally named Rattlesnake Peak (1,421 feet; 433 m.)
