= Temescal Mountains =

Mountain range of the Peninsular Ranges in Southern California

- Gavilan Mountains, Gavilan Hills
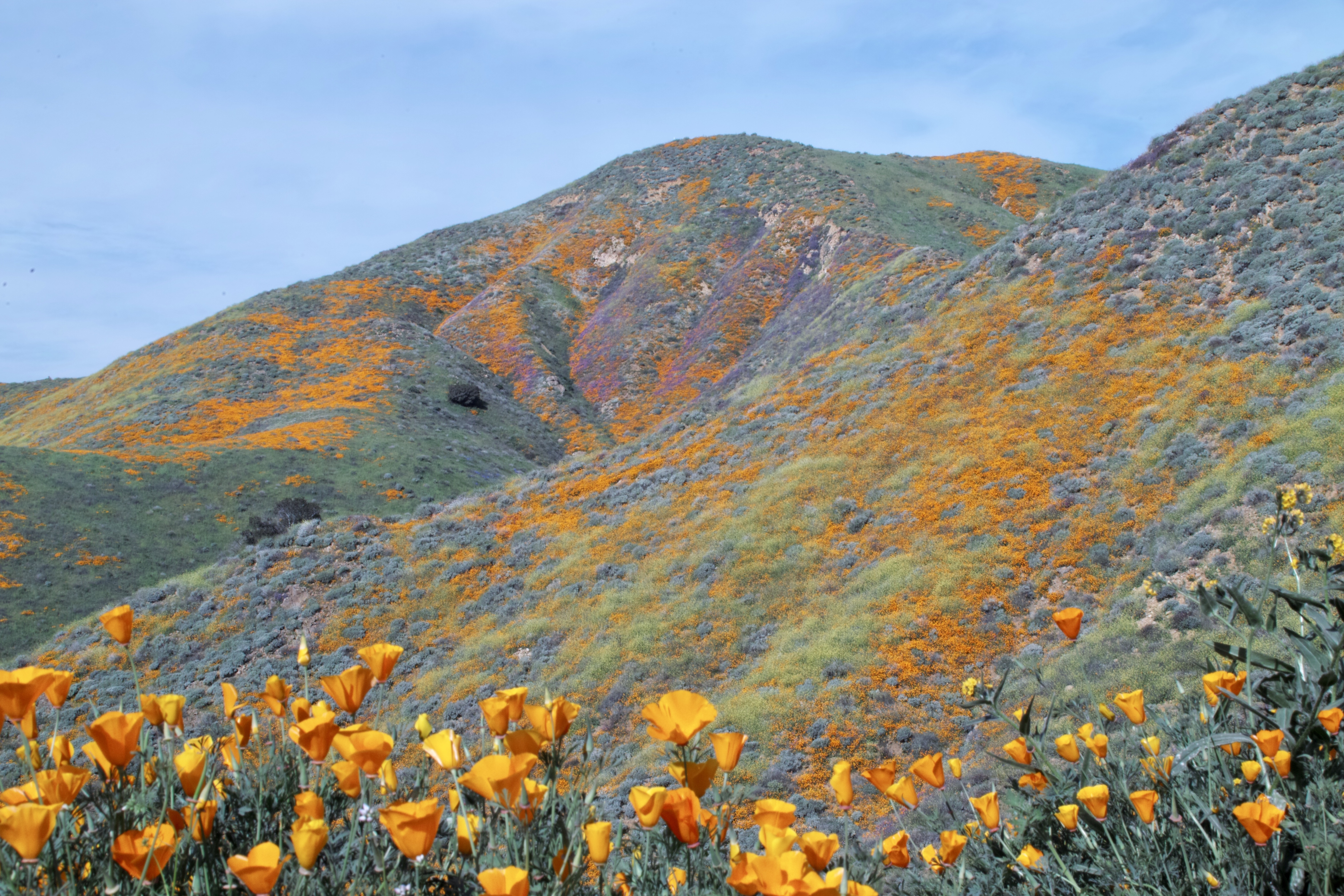

Highest point
- Peak: Estelle Mountain
- Elevation: 2,762 ft (842 m)
- Coordinates: 33°46′13″N 117°20′6″W

Dimensions
- Length: 25 mi (40 km) SE
- Width: 10 mi (16 km) E

Naming
- Native name: Sierra Temescal (Spanish)

Geography
- Location within California
- Country: United States
- State: California
- County: Riverside
- Settlements: Canyon Lake, Corona, El Sobrante, Good Hope, Lake Elsinore, Lake Mathews, Mead Valley, Meadowbrook, Menifee, Murrieta, Norco, Riverside, Wildomar and Woodcrest
- Parent range: Peninsular Ranges
- Borders on: Santa Ana River, Sycamore Canyon, Elsinore Trough, Temecula Basin, San Jacinto Basin (Menifee Valley, Paloma Valley, Perris Valley) and Warm Springs Creek

Geology
- Rock type(s): Fault-block, igneous, batholith

The Temescal Mountains, also known as the Sierra Temescal (Spanish for "sweat lodge range"), are a mountain range of the Peninsular Ranges in western Riverside County, in Southern California in the United States. One of the northernmost Peninsular ranges, they extend for approximately 25 mi (40 km) southeast of the Santa Ana River east of the Elsinore Fault Zone to the Temecula Basin and form the western edge of the Perris Block.

The Santa Ana Mountains lie to the west, the Elsinore Mountains to the south and the Perris Valley and Lakeview Mountains to the east.

== History ==
The Temescal Mountains were originally named by the Spanish as Sierra Temescal (perhaps from the nearby Rancho Temescal), a name which appears on the Rail Road Route survey map made by the U. S. Army Pacific Railroad Surveys in 1854–55. The Temescal Mountains are one of the northernmost of Peninsular Ranges of California, running from the south side of the Santa Anna River, southeast nearly parallel with the Santa Ana Mountains, from which it is separated by the Temescal Valley and Elsinore Valley sections of the Elsinore Trough. The Temescal Mountains were originally considered to be bounded on the south by the San Jacinto River, by J. D. Whitney in his 1865 Geological Survey of California. A later study by Rene Engel, considers the Sedco Hills and the other mountains that extend to the southeast of the San Jacinto River east of Lake Elsinore and north of the Temecula Basin, in Murrieta to be part of the same range forming the natural continuation of the mountains. The Murrieta Hogbacks are the southeasternmost heights of the range, overlooking the Warm Springs Creek Canyon.

== Geology ==
As part of the Perris Block, the Temescal Mountains are part of its eroded mass of Cretaceous and older granitic rocks of the Peninsular Ranges Batholith and metasedimentary basement rocks. Most of this basement rock that once overlay the granitic plutons that rose up into it, has been eroded away, the remainder being found between the similarly eroded plutons of granitic rock.

== Natural resources ==
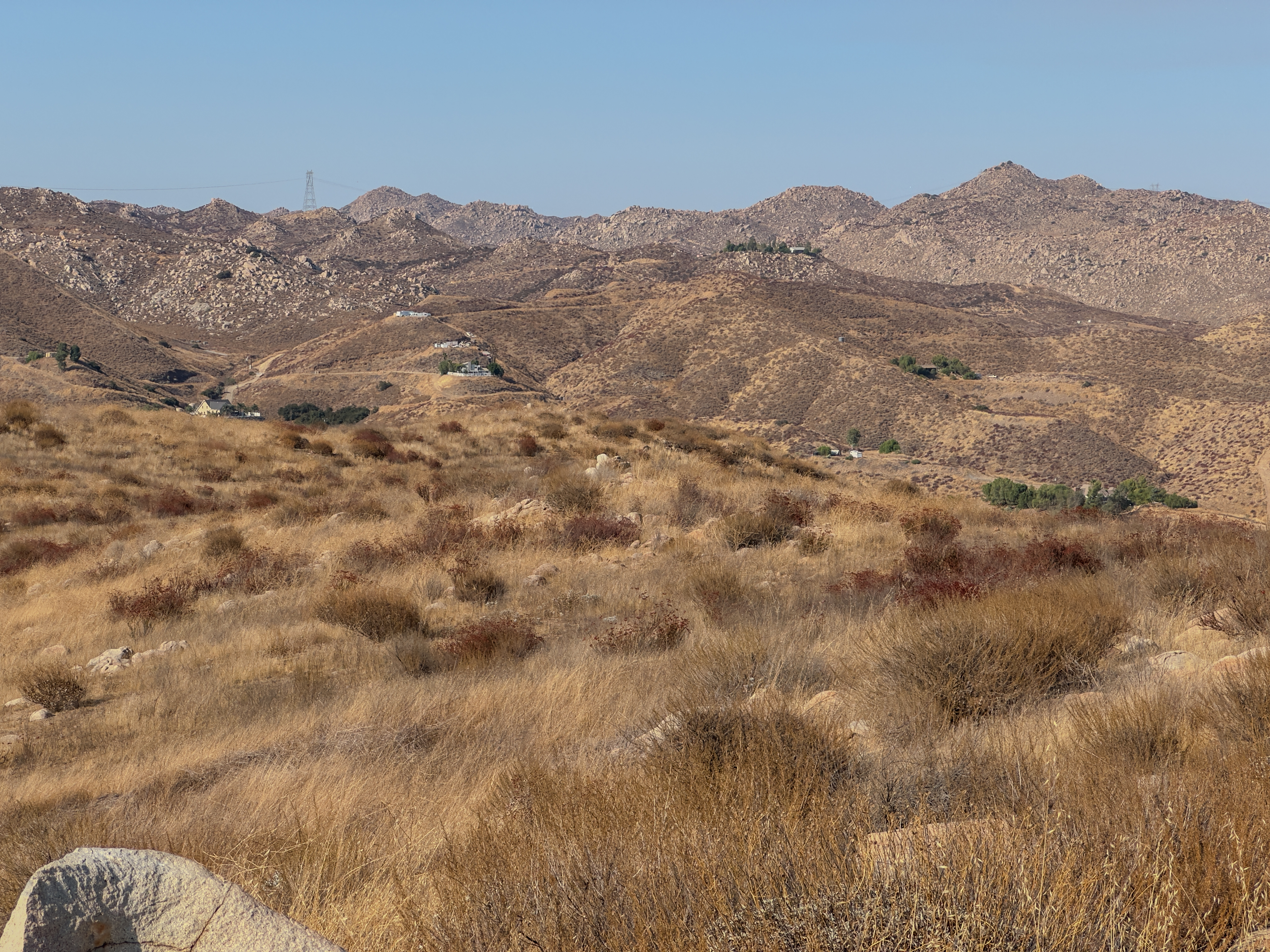
Temescal Mountains in Summer near El Toro Cutoff Road, Lake Elsinore, California

Flora
As part of the California Floristic Province, the Temescal Mountains host a diverse array of plant species within distinctive natural (plant) communities, including coastal sage scrub, chaparral, riparian woodland, southern oak woodland, rocky outcrop and valley grassland. Rare flowers like the intermediate mariposa lily, grow there. Fragrant sages, evergreen shrubs and trees, perennial bunchgrasses, Dudleya species of succulents, fire-following flowers and other wildflowers adorn the terrain.

Fauna
Wildlife species found include mountain lion, mule deer, bobcat, coyote, raccoon, gray fox, American badger, spotted skunk, kangaroo rat, bats, ravens, red tailed hawk, mountain quail, canyon wren, speckled rattlesnake, Pacific rattlesnake, common kingsnake, gopher snake, two-striped garter snake, rosy boa, San Diego night snake, granite spiny lizard, arroyo toad, western spadefoot toad, various Aphonopelma species of tarantula, Quino checkerspot butterfly and many more. Gray wolf, pronghorn, and California condor were also once found in the range.

Commercial uses
A number of mineral resources have been mined in the range. Commercial resources collected since the 1840s have included the metals tin and gold, and the non-metals clay, coal, and granite. Parts of the range have been used to graze domestic livestock from the early 19th century. The little water found in the range has become a particularly valued resource.

== Geographic features ==
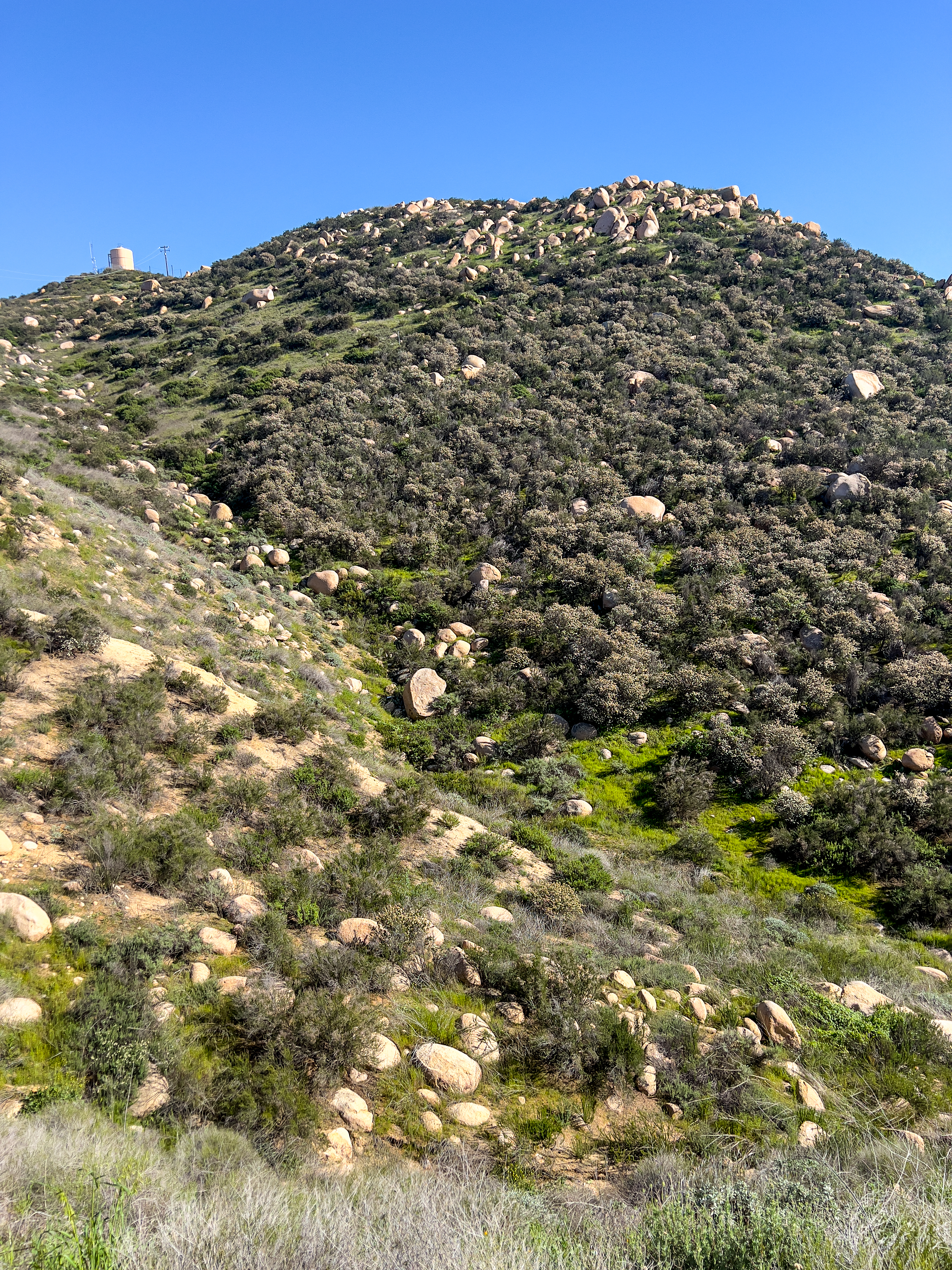
Sedco Hills viewed from Wildomar, California

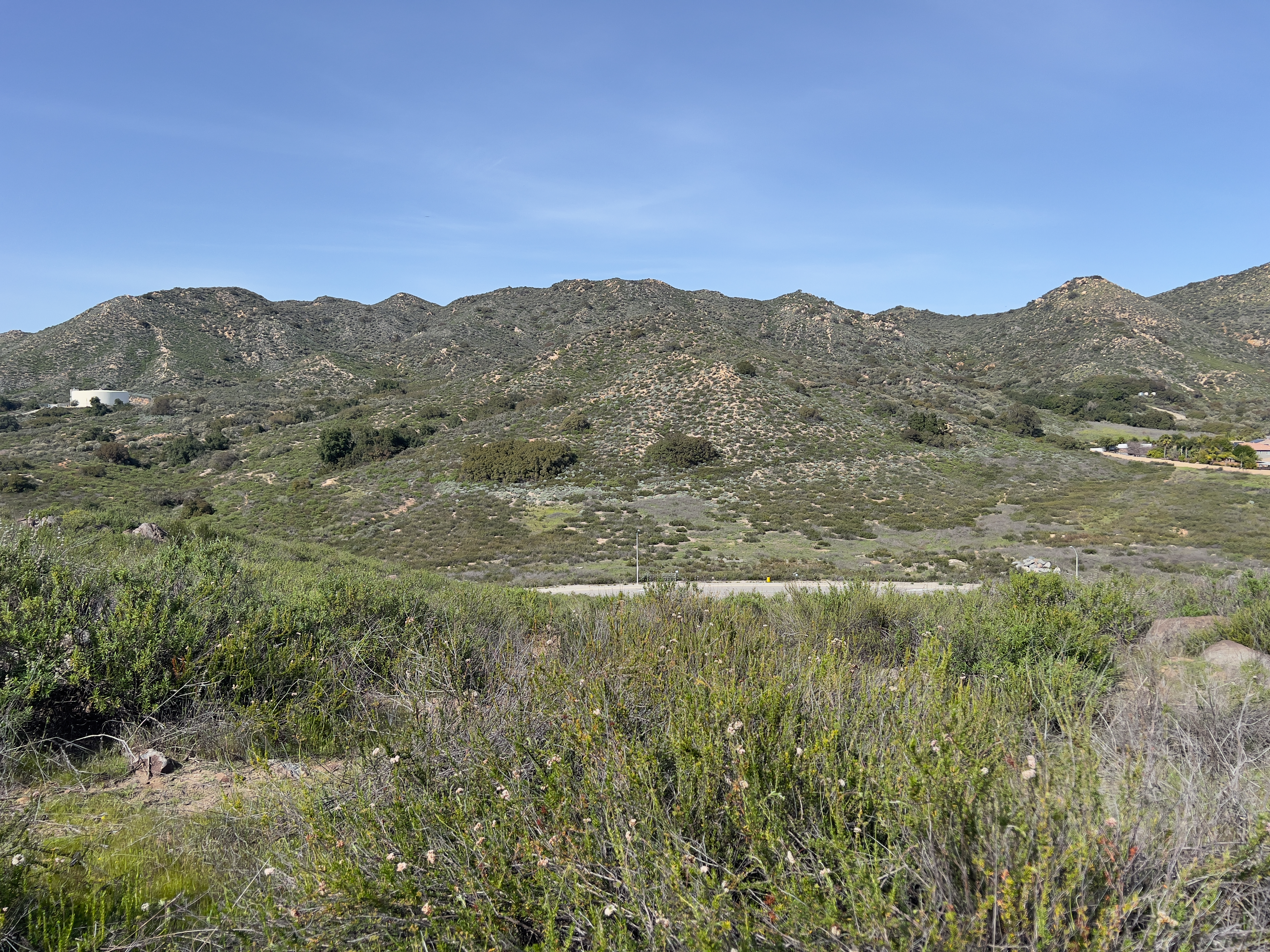
Temescal Mountains viewed from Iodine Springs Reserve

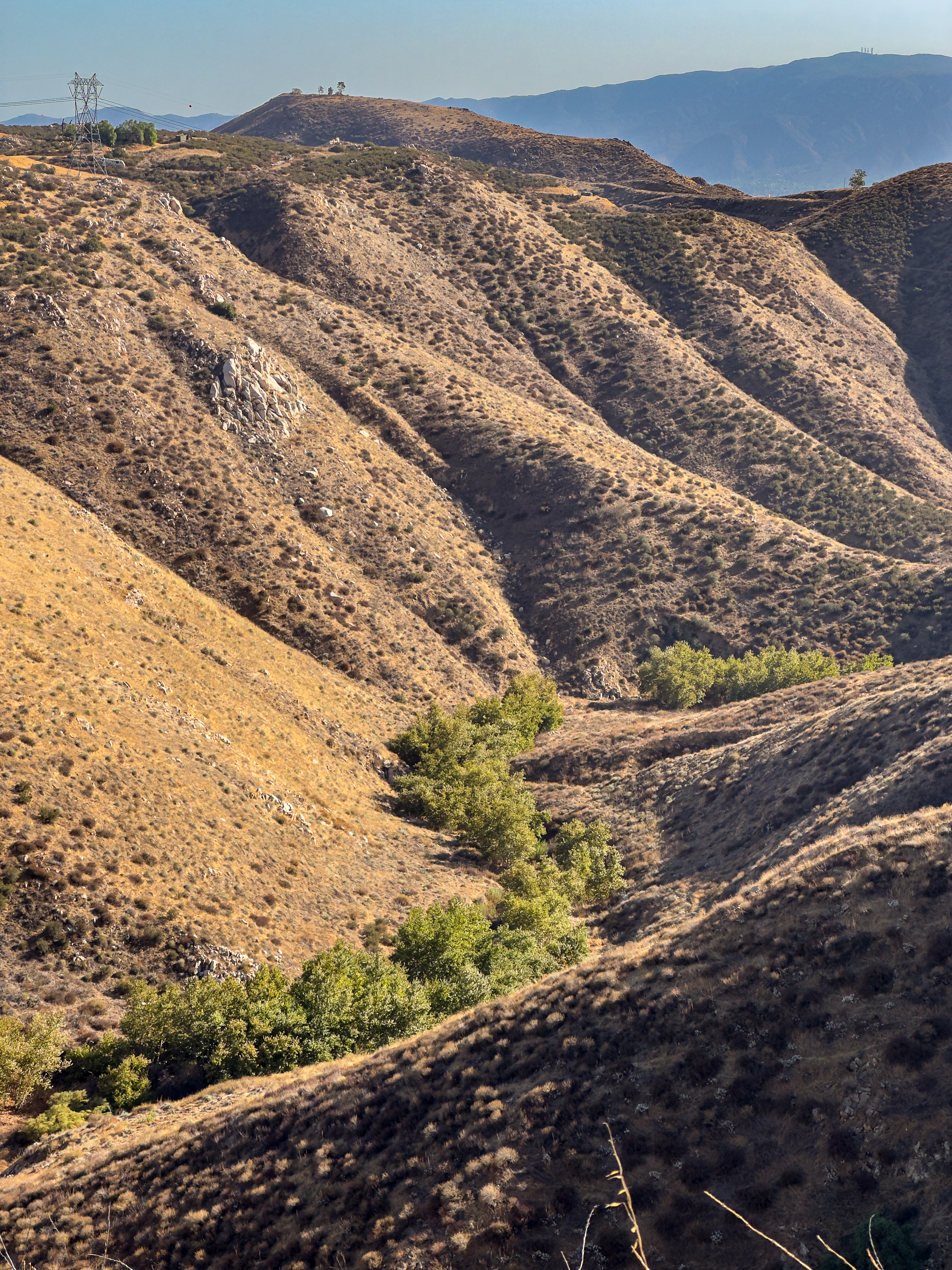
Tributary of Temescal Creek

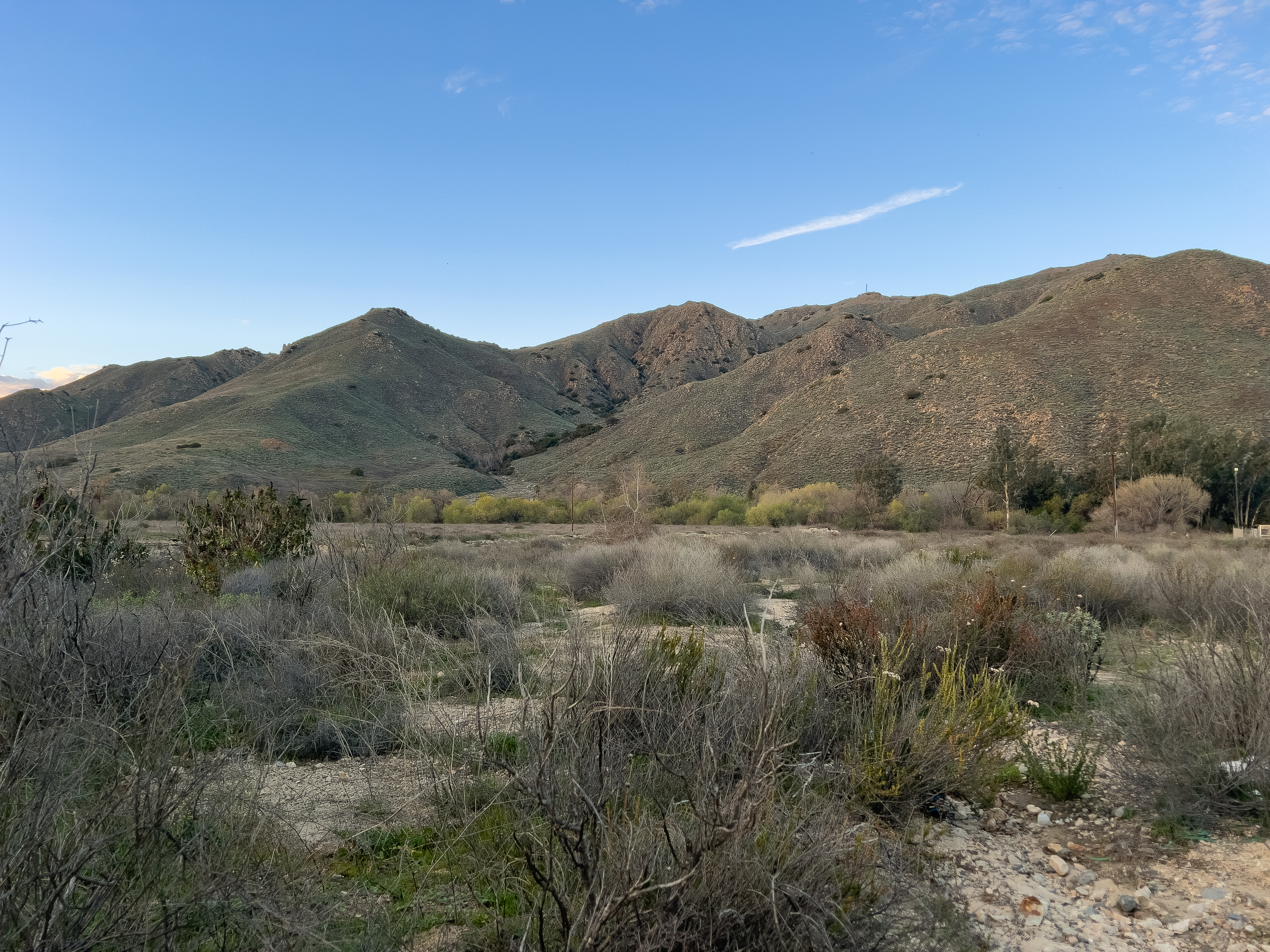
Temescal Mountains viewed from Temescal Valley

Geographic features, northwest to southeast, include:

- Beacon Hill
- Lake Norconian
- La Sierra Heights or Norco Hills
  - Hole Benchmark
  - Linn Benchmark
  - Rattlesnake Peak (Riverside County, California)
  - La Sierra Summit
  - Grape Benchmark
- Riverside Valley
  - Pedley Hills
  - Lake Evans reservoir
    - Spring Brook
  - North Hill
  - Mount Rubidoux
  - Tequesquito Arroyo
    - Box Springs Canyon
    - Sycamore Canyon
  - Pachappa Hill
  - Victoria Hill
  - Alessandro Arroyo
  - Quarry Hill
  - Prenda Arroyo
  - Woodcrest Arroyo
  - Mockingbird Canyon
- Arlington Mountain
- Eagle Valley
- Three Sisters
- Cajalco Canyon Creek
  - Cajalco Canyon
  - Lake Mathews
  - Cajalco Valley
  - Harford Spring Canyon
  - Mead Valley
- Olsen Canyon
- Black Rocks
- Monument Peak
- Gavilan Peak
- Gavilan Plateau
- Gavilan Hills
  - Summit 2557
  - Santa Rosa Mine Ridge
  - Steele Peak
- Steele Valley
- Dawson Canyon
- Estelle Mountain
- Summit 2729
- Summit 2615
- Summit 2625
- Ceramic Factory Canyon
- Alberhill Canyon
- Gavilan Wash
- Walker Canyon
- Alberhill Summit
- Clevelin Hills
- Warm Springs Valley
- Stovepipe Canyon
- Arroyo del Toro
- Rosetta Canyon
- Wasson Canyon
- Railroad Canyon
  - Canyon Lake reservoir
  - City of Canyon Lake
- Quail Valley
- Gripp Hill
- Cottonwood Canyon
- Sedco Hills
  - Guadalupe Hill
  - Wildomar Peak
- Bundy Canyon
- Iodine Spring Summit
  - Iodine Spring
- Adelaide Peak
- Murrieta Hogbacks
