= Sedco Hills, California =

- CDP
- Location in Riverside County and the state of California
- Coordinates: 33°38′26″N 117°17′9″W
- Country: United States
- State: California
- County: Riverside

Area
  - Total: 1.6 sq mi (4.2 km^{2})
  - Land: 1.6 sq mi (4.2 km^{2})
  - Water: 0 sq mi (0 km^{2})
- Elevation: 1,276 ft (389 m)

Population (2000)
  - Total: 3,078
  - Density: 1,898/sq mi (732.9/km^{2})
- Time zone: UTC-8 (PST)
  - Summer (DST): UTC-7 (PDT)
- ZIP code: 92595
- Area code: 951
- FIPS code: 06-70784
- GNIS feature ID: 1652794

Sedco Hills is a former census-designated place (CDP) in Riverside County, California, United States. The population was 3,078 at the 2000 census. Sedco Hills became part of the City of Wildomar upon its incorporation on July 1, 2008.

== Geography ==
Sedco Hills is located at 33°38′26″N 117°17′9″W (33.640690, -117.285842).

According to the United States Census Bureau, the CDP has a total area of 1.6 square miles (4.1 km^{2}), all of it land.

== History ==
The name Sedco comes from the South Elsinore Development Company, a land company that developed the area in the past. The name Sedco Hills has become the informal name of that section of the Temescal Mountains east of Sedco Hills, west of Cottonwood Canyon Creek and south of the San Jacinto River.

== Demographics ==
As of the census of 2000, there were 3,078 people, 1,036 households, and 735 families residing in the CDP. The population density was 1,885.3 inhabitants per square mile (727.9/km^{2}). There were 1,123 housing units at an average density of 687.8 per square mile (265.6/km^{2}). The racial makeup of the CDP was 73.9% White, 3.3% African American, 2.0% Native American, 1.1% Asian, <0.1% Pacific Islander, 16.1% from other races, and 3.6% from two or more races. Hispanic or Latino of any race were 36.3% of the population.

There were 1,036 households, out of which 35.4% had children under the age of 18 living with them, 50.4% were married couples living together, 13.9% had a female householder with no husband present, and 29.0% were non-families. 22.6% of all households were made up of individuals, and 11.8% had someone living alone who was 65 years of age or older. The average household size was 2.97 and the average family size was 3.48.

In the CDP the population was spread out, with 30.1% under the age of 18, 8.7% from 18 to 24, 26.7% from 25 to 44, 19.4% from 45 to 64, and 15.0% who were 65 years of age or older. The median age was 34 years. For every 100 females, there were 97.9 males. For every 100 females age 18 and over, there were 91.8 males.

The median income for a household in the CDP was $28,766, and the median income for a family was $35,481. Males had a median income of $32,679 versus $19,375 for females. The per capita income for the CDP was $13,101. About 16.7% of families and 18.4% of the population were below the poverty line, including 23.6% of those under age 18 and 11.3% of those age 65 or over.

== Government ==
In the California State Legislature, Sedco Hills is in the 28th senatorial district, represented by Democrat Lola Smallwood-Cuevas, and in the 67th Assembly district, represented by Democrat Sharon Quirk-Silva.

In the United States House of Representatives, Sedco Hills is in California's 42nd congressional district, represented by Democrat Robert Garcia.
