= Adelaide Peak =

Mountain peak in California, U.S.

- Location within California

Highest point
- Elevation: 2,279 ft (695 m)
- Prominence: 207 ft (63 m)
- Coordinates: 33°37′24″N 117°12′07″W

Geography
- Location: Riverside County, California, U.S.
- Parent range: Temescal Mountains
- Topo map(s): USGS Murrieta, CA

Geology
- Rock age: Cretaceous
- Mountain type: Granitic

Adelaide Peak is an unofficially named mountain peak in the southern part of the Temescal Mountains. It lies at an elevation of 2,279 feet (695 m). It is composed of Cretaceous granitic rocks of the Peninsular Ranges Batholith.

Adelaide Peak is drained on its southern slopes by an officially unnamed tributary arroyo of Murrieta Creek, tributary of the Santa Margarita River. It is drained on its northern slopes by an officially unnamed tributary arroyo of Salt Creek, itself a tributary of the San Jacinto River.
