= Eagle Valley (California) =

Valley in California, United States

Eagle Valley is a basin in the Temescal Mountains, of Riverside County, California. It has an elevation of 1,283 feet (391 meters). The basin is overlooked by summits of the Temescal Mountains on the west, north and east, the tallest is the 1,857-foot (566 m) Arlington Mountain on the northeast. The valley is drained by three streams, the primary one, has its source on the south slope of Arlington Mountain and drains southwestward into Cajalco Canyon and Cajalco Canyon Creek.

The basin and mountains were encompassed by part of the Mexican land grant of Rancho San Jacinto Sobrante. The historic Cajalco Tin Mine was located in this valley at 33°50′51″N 117°28′50″W.
