= Murrieta Hogbacks =

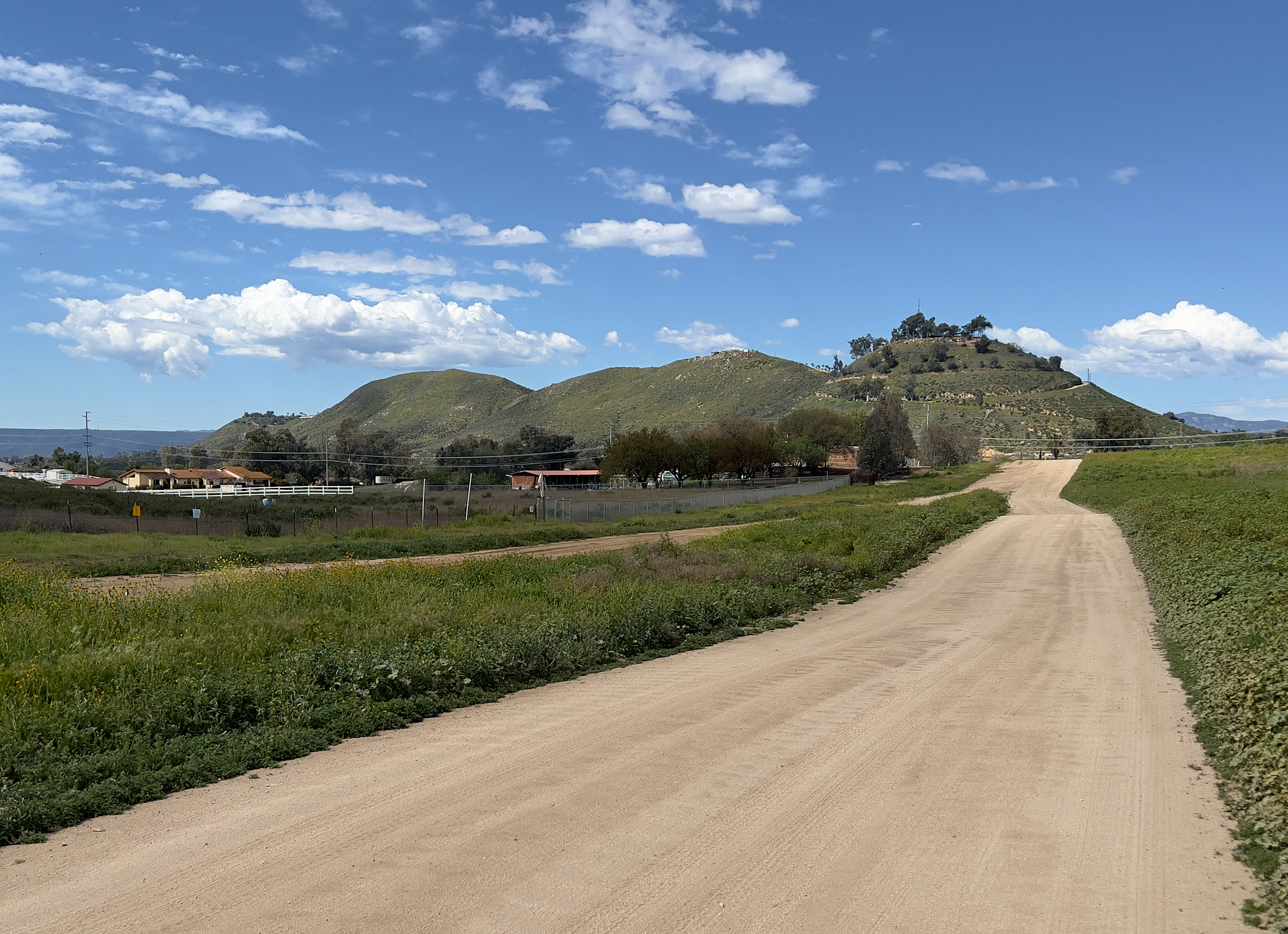
- Murrieta Hogbacks viewed from Northeast Murrieta

Highest point
- Elevation: 1,781 ft (543 m)
- Prominence: 341 ft (104 m)
- Coordinates: 33°35′09″N 117°09′14″W

Geography
- Location within California
- Location: Riverside County, California, U.S.
- Parent range: Temescal Mountains
- Topo map(s): USGS Murrieta, CA

Geology
- Rock age(s): Cretaceous, Miocene
- Mountain type(s): Granitic, Basalt

The Murrieta Hogbacks are Miocene basalt capped granitic hogbacks located in northeastern Murrieta on the southern end of the Temescal Mountains of Riverside County, California.

== Geology ==
The Murrieta Hogbacks are underlain by Cretaceous granitic rocks of the Peninsular Ranges Batholith. On the north half of the hogbacks, by foliated biotite-hornblende tonalite and on the southern half by hornblende gabbro. The basalt is potassium-argon dated to 10.4 to 10.8 million years and is a remnant of a channel-filling basalt flow, overlying a thin deposit of unconsolidated gray stream gravel, indicating that the basalt had filled in a former water course.
