= North Hill (Riverside, California) =

Hill in Riverside, California, United States

- Location within California Location within the United States

Highest point
- Elevation: 909 ft (277 m)
- Coordinates: 33°59′35.00″N 117°22′21.35″W

Geography
- Location: Riverside County, California, United States
- Topo map: USGS Riverside East

North Hill is the most northeasterly of the range of hills running in that direction from Mount Rubidoux, located within the city of Riverside, north of the city center and southeast of Lake Evans. It has an elevation of 1084 feet. This range of hills bordering the Santa Ana River and the Riverside Valley is the northernmost of several within the Temescal Mountains.
