= Victoria Hill (Riverside County) =

- Location within California

Highest point
- Elevation: 1,005 ft (306 m) NGVD 29
- Coordinates: 33°57′34″N 117°22′13″W

Geography
- Location: Riverside County, California, U.S.
- Topo map: USGS Riverside East

Victoria Hill is a hill in the city of Riverside, California which is the seat of Riverside County, California.

It has an elevation of 1,005 feet (306 m) and is located half a mile (0.6 km) east of California State Route 91, at around postmile 19, which is south of intersection with California State Route 60.
