= Sedco Hills (California) =

Section of the Temescal Mountains in Riverside County, California

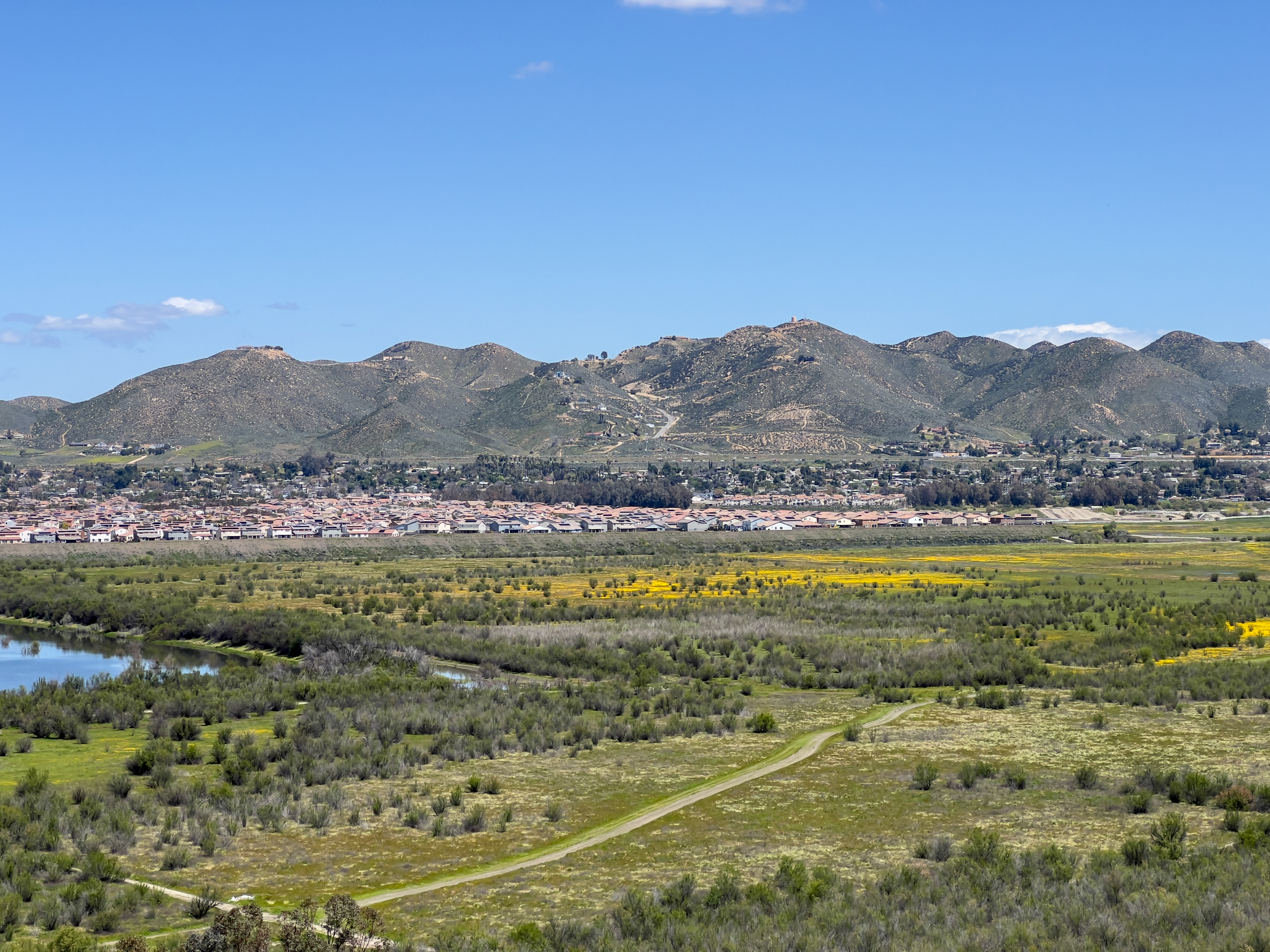
- A view of Sedco Hills from Rome Hill

Highest point
- Peak: Wildomar Peak
- Elevation: 2,432 ft (741 m)

Geography
- Location within California Location within the United States
- Country: United States
- State: California
- Region: Temescal Mountains
- District: Riverside County
- Range coordinates: 33°39′10″N 117°15′56″W
- Topo map: USGS Lake Elsinore

Sedco Hills is the informal/local name for a southern section of the Temescal Mountains, located in southwestern Riverside County, California.

They were named after the town of Sedco Hills, located on their west side and now part of the city of Wildomar. The placename Sedco was introduced by the South Elsinore Development Company, that subdivided and sold the land on the southeast side of the lake.

== Geography ==
The hills lie southeast of Lake Elsinore and the city of Lake Elsinore, south of the San Jacinto River and Canyon Lake reservoir, west of Cottonwood Canyon, and north of Bundy Canyon.

The highest elevation of the hills is 2,432 feet (741 m) Wildomar Peak at the south end of the range, overlooking Bundy Canyon. Second highest is Guadalupe Hill at 2,267 feet (691 m), in the middle of the range overlooking Cottonwood Canyon.
