= Lake Norconian =

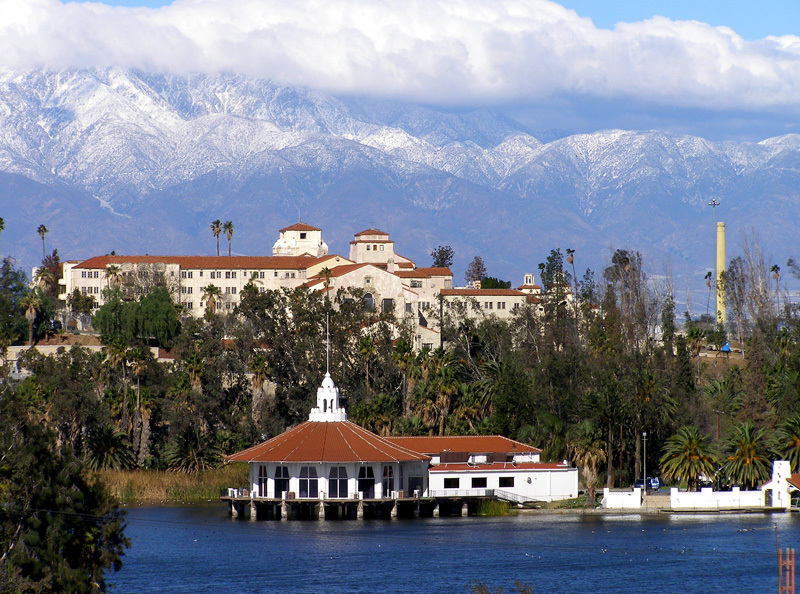
- Lake Norconian with pavilion and clubhouse/hotel in the background.

- Location within California Location within the United States
- Location: Riverside County, California
- Coordinates: 33°55′27″N 117°34′15″W
- Type: lake
- Basin countries: United States
- Max. length: 1,800 feet (550 m) (approx.)
- Max. width: 1,800 feet (550 m) (approx.)
- Surface area: 60 acres (24 ha)
- Surface elevation: 653 feet (199 m)
- Islands: one small island
- Settlements: Norco, California

Lake Norconian is an artificial lake in Norco, Riverside County, California.

Lake Norconian was created in the early 1920s as part of the Norconian Resort. This 60-acre (24 ha) lake was equipped with a boat house and pavilion. It was the site where a few 1930s movies were filmed.

The lake and resort were acquired by the US Navy in 1941; the area is operated as Naval Surface Warfare Center Corona, part of the Naval Surface Warfare Center.

== See also ==
- List of lakes in California
