= Arlington Mountain =

Mountain in Riverside County, California, United States

- Location within California

Highest point
- Elevation: 1,857 ft (566 m) NAVD 88
- Prominence: 473 ft (144 m)
- Coordinates: 33°52′17″N 117°28′18″W

Geography
- Location: Riverside County, California, U.S.
- Parent range: Temescal Mountains
- Topo map: USGS Lake Mathews

Geology
- Rock age: Cretaceous
- Mountain type: Granitic

Arlington Mountain is a 1,857-foot (566 m) high peak in the northern Temescal Mountains. It is located northwest of nearby Lake Mathews, overlooking western Riverside, in Riverside County, California.
