= List of timelines related to California =

Timelines of regions in California

This is a list of timelines related to the state of California. (Note: For a list of articles related to California history, see California history-related lists) The timelines below cover the history of California as a whole and timelines of major cities and regions.

== Lists ==
=== State ===
- Territorial evolution of California

=== Regions ===
- Timeline of Anaheim, California
- Timeline of Bakersfield, California
- Timeline of Fresno, California
- Timeline of Long Beach, California
- Timeline of Los Angeles
- Timeline of Mountain View, California
- Timeline of Oakland, California
- Timeline of Riverside, California
- Timeline of Sacramento, California
- Timeline of San Bernardino, California history
- Timeline of San Diego
- Timeline of San Francisco
- Timeline of San Jose, California
- Timeline of Santa Ana, California

== See also ==
- History of California before 1900
- History of California (1900–present)
