= Peticolas =

Peticolas is a Franco-American surname, derived from petit (little) and colas (fish). People with the surname include:

- Philippe Abraham Peticolas (1760–1841), American portrait painter
- Sherry Peticolas (1904–1956), American sculptor
