= Timeline of Los Angeles =

Los Angeles County's incorporated (grey) and unincorporated (white) areas; the limits of the city of Los Angeles are highlighted red

The following is a general historical timeline of the city of Los Angeles (LA), California, and the incorporated cities or unincorporated areas closest to LA's city limits which are part of the "Greater LA" metropolitan area—such as Santa Monica city and the unincorporated community of East Los Angeles. More distant areas of LA County, such as Santa Clarita city, are not included, as are the urban areas of "Greater LA" which fall within Riverside County and Orange County jurisdictions.

== Pre-Columbian era ==
- 8,000 BCE – Chumash and Tongva Tribes inhabited the Los Angeles Basin for thousands of years before the arrival of Europeans in the area.
  - Angeles Mesa skeletons Remains of Indigenous people discovered in Ballona Plain, 1924
  - La Brea Woman 10,250 year old BP Remains of Indigenous woman discovered in La Brea Tar Pits,1914
- 2,000 BCE to 700 CE, the Uto-Aztecan (formerly known as Shoshonean) peoples entered the LA basin, absorbing or displacing the previous Hokan-speaking peoples

== 16th century ==
=== English exploration ===
- 1542
  - October 8: Juan Rodríguez Cabrillo sails from Catalina Island to San Pedro Bay and names it Bay of Smoke.
  - October 9: Cabrillo anchors in Santa Monica Bay then departs north.
  - November 23: Cabrillo on his return trip, anchors and lands in Catalina Island to overwinter and make repairs. The Party of Explorers departed a short time later.

== 17th century ==
- 1602
  - November 20: Sebastián Vizcaíno anchors and lands in Catalina Island for a short time during his voyage northward.

== 18th century ==
=== Spanish colonization ===
- 1769
  - Late July: José Francisco Ortega scout leader for the Portolá expedition is the first non-indigenous person to explore the LA Basin via a land trail.
- 1771
  - September 8: Original San Gabriel Mission is Built near Whittier Narrows.
- 1776 – Original San Gabriel Mission is destroyed in a flash flood forcing the Priest to move the location 5 miles north, building the new Mission San Gabriel Arcángel.
- 1781
  - September 4: El Pueblo de Nuestra Señora de Los Angeles de Porciuncula founded in colonial New Spain by 44 settlers, 20 of whom were of African American or Native American descent.
- 1790's – Vicente Sanchez Adobe is built in the Eastern Foothills of Baldwin Hills.
- 1795 – Construction commences on the Casa de Rancho San Antonio completed in 1810.

== 19th century ==
=== 1800 to 1825 ===
- 1818 – Avila Adobe built.
- 1820 – Los Angeles Pueblo Population: 650
- 1821 – Rancho Rincón de los Bueyes granted

MEXICAN PERIOD

- 1821
  - September 28: In Mexico City, the Mexican Empire declares independence; news would reach California months later.
- 1822
  - Joseph John Chapman, an Anglo-American who became one of the earliest English-speaking settlers and builders of Mexican Alta California, helps to build the roof of La Iglesia de Nuestra Señora la Reina de los Ángeles.
  - April 9: A junta in Monterey headed by governor De Solá swear an oath allegiance of the Alta California Province to the Mexican Empire; in the following days, public oaths were taken in the pueblos and missions of Alta California.
  - May: José Palomares goes to Monterey as the elector selected to represent the pueblo de Los Ángeles in the election of a deputy from the province to the Congress.
- 1823
  - Rancho Las Ciénegas granted

=== 1825 to 1850 ===
- 1826
  - November 27: Jedediah Smith, an Anglo-American Explorer, arrives at Mission San Gabriel Arcángel from the Great Salt Lake area, making him the first American to reach Alta California via a land route.
- Dominguez Rancho Adobe
- 1827 – Jonathan Temple and John Rice opened the first general store in the pueblo, later followed by J. D. Leandry.
- 1828 - Rancho La Brea grant
- 1830 – Los Angeles Pueblo Population: 730.
- 1831
  - Jean-Louis Vignes bought 104 acres (0.42 km^{2}) of land located between the original Pueblo and the banks of the Los Angeles River. He planted a vineyard and prepared to make wine.
  - Rancho Rosa Castilla grant
- 1833 – Los Angeles Trade and commerce further increased with the secularization of the California missions by the Mexican Congress. Extensive mission lands suddenly became available to government officials, ranchers, and land speculators. The governor made more than 800 land grants during this period to wealthy Californios.
- 1834
  - Governor Pico married Maria Ignacio Alvarado in the Plaza church. It was attended by the entire population of the pueblo, 800 people, plus hundreds from elsewhere in Alta California.
  - Rancho San Pascual grant
  - Centinela Adobe
  - Rómulo Pico Adobe
- 1835
  - May 23: On the advice of the territory's deputy, José Carrillo, Los Angeles, is given the title of Ciudad and was declared the capital of the Alta California Territory by the Mexican Congress. The de facto capital remained in Monterey until decades later and the decision furthered political tensions in the territory.
- 1836 – The Indian village of Yaanga was relocated near the future corner of Commercial and Alameda Streets.
- 1839 – Rancho San Vicente y Santa Monica grant
- Hugo Reid Adobe
- 1841 – Los Angeles City Population: 1,680
- 1840s – Lugo Adobe
- 1844 – Leonis Adobe
- 1845 – The Indian village of Yaanga was relocated again to present-day Boyle Heights.

AMERICAN INVASION

- 1846
  - August 6: US Navy Commodore Robert F. Stockton lands Military Force in San Pedro and sets up camp near Casa de San Pedro.
  - August 13: Stockton and Frémont rendezvous South of Los Angeles to commence the Capture of the City.
  - September 23–30: Siege of Los Angeles, a Civil rebellion against American occupation led By Jose Maria Flores recaptures Los Angeles from U.S. forces, U.S. Officer Gillespie is forced to retreat to San Pedro Camp.
  - October 6: U.S. troops under William Mervine land in San Pedro to attempt to recapture Los Angeles.
  - October 8–9: Battle of Dominguez Rancho, US Marines engage in a battle with the Mexican Californios, the Mexicans defeated the United States Military forces. causing them to retreat once again.
- 1847
  - January 8–9: Battle of Río San Gabriel, Mexican's block path into Los Angeles at Pico Rivera. American Troops are Victorious and the Mexicans Retreat.
  - January 10: Battle of La Mesa, Los Angeles taken by U.S. forces.
  - January 13: Treaty of Cahuenga, Signed by Andrés Pico & John C. Frémont ends American military action and completes the American Conquest of California.

AMERICAN PERIOD

- 1848
  - February 2: Los Angeles becomes part of U.S. territory per Treaty of Guadalupe Hidalgo.
- 1849 – Lieutenant Edward Ord surveyed Los Angeles to confirm and extend the streets of the city. His survey put the city into the real-estate business, creating its first real-estate boom and filling its treasury. Street names were changed from Spanish to English.

=== 1850s ===
- 1850
  - April 4: Los Angeles incorporated.
  - September 9: Los Angeles becomes part of the new U.S. state of California.
  - Population: 1,610 city; 3,530 county.
  - Los Angeles County established.
- 1850s – Vicente de la Osa fences off Encino Hot Springs
- 1850s – Ygnacio Palomares Adobe
- 1851 – Los Angeles Star, city's first newspaper, begins publication. Hugo Reid, who was married to an indigenous woman Victoria Reid published his series The Indians of Los Angeles County in the newspaper as part of his campaign to be named Indian agent.
- 1854 – Round House constructed.
- 1855 – First City public school building built.
- 1858 – U.S. government begins issuing patents confirming Spanish and Mexican-era rancho land grants within Los Angeles County
- 1859 – Los Angeles County votes to secede from California to form the Territory of Colorado, voting 1,407–441 in favor of secession. Congress throws out secession proposal the following year amid the Civil War.

=== 1860s ===
- 1860 – Los Angeles Soap Company in business, founded by John A. Forthmann.
- 1861 – U.S. Army establishes Camp Latham along Ballona Creek
- 1863 – U.S. Army opens Drum Barracks at Wilmington
- 1865 – Loyola High School (Los Angeles) opens.
- 1866 – Dedication of Town Square, now known as Pershing Square
- 1868
  - First street lighting installed.
  - Creation of Echo Park reservoir
- 1869
  - Los Angeles Police Department is formed.
  - October 26: Los Angeles & San Pedro Railroad begins operating.
  - William Rosecrans buys Rosecrans Tract in vicinity of present-day Gardena

=== 1870s ===
- 1871
  - October 24: Anti-Chinese unrest.
  - Evening Express newspaper begins publication.
  - San Pedro Harbor development begins.
- 1872
  - First African Methodist Episcopal Church established.
  - Exposition Park established
- 1873 – Los Angeles Daily Herald newspaper begins publication.
- 1874
  - May: Tiburcio Vásquez California's first Notorious Celebrity was caught and apprehended after a shootout in Today's West Hollywood
- 1875 – Los Angeles and Independence Railroad begins operating to Santa Monica.
- 1876
  - September 6 – Southern Pacific Railroad (San Francisco-Los Angeles line) begins operating Los Angeles' first link to transcontinental railroad.
  - Cathedral of Saint Vibiana built.
  - Pico Canyon Oilfield drilled in LA Outskirts, making it the first commercially successful oil well in the Western United States and is considered the birthplace of California's oil industry.
- Governor Stoneman Adobe, Los Robles
- 1877
  - First oranges shipped to eastern markets.

=== 1880s ===
- 1880s: Westlake Park, now MacArthur Park, laid out around natural springs
- 1880
  - University of Southern California opens.
  - Population: 11,183 city; 33,381 county.
- 1881
  - Los Angeles Daily Times begins publication.
  - Donation of land for Lincoln Park
  - Hamburger's Department Store opens
- 1882
  - Los Angeles State Normal School opens.
  - Lopez Adobe
- 1883 – City Railroad Company established.
- 1884 – Child's Grand Opera House opens.
- 1886
  - Kansas City-Los Angeles railway begins operating.
  - City Fire Department and Elysian Park established.
  - Pasadena and Santa Monica incorporated in Los Angeles County.
  - Many people arrive as a result of railroad rate war; speculative real estate boom begins.

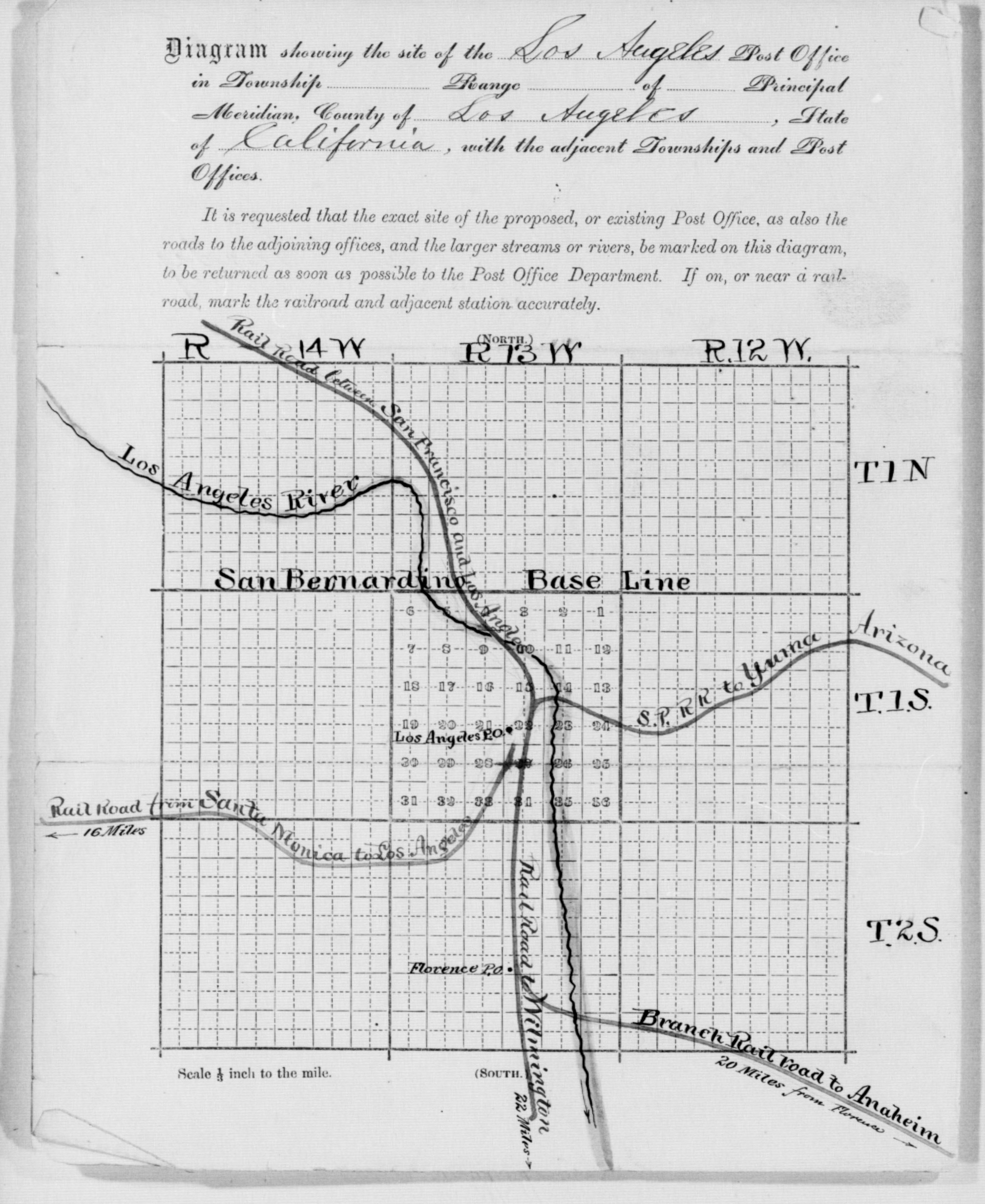
Map submitted to Post Office Department showing rail lines and river (c. 1885)

- 1887
  - Peak of 1880s Southern California real estate boom; many towns laid out.
  - Los Angeles Athletic Club incorporated.
  - April 20 – Occidental College founded.
  - Pomona incorporated in Los Angeles County.
  - California Central Railway connects Redondo Junction and Port Ballona
- 1888
  - Land boom collapses.
  - Southern Pacific's Arcade Depot opens.
  - Chamber of Commerce founded.
  - California Club incorporated.
  - Long Beach incorporated in Los Angeles County.
- 1889
  - City Parks Department and Los Angeles Oil Exchange founded.
  - Orange County established.

=== 1890s ===
- 1890 – Population: 50,400 city; 101,454 county.
- 1892
  - Redondo Beach incorporated in Los Angeles County.
  - February – Oil discovered within Los Angeles City limits.
  - Federal courthouse opens downtown
- 1893
  - Bradbury Building constructed.
  - July 4 – Mount Lowe Railway opens north of Pasadena.
  - July 29 – La Grande Station opens.
- 1894
  - Fiesta de Los Angeles begins.
  - Long Wharf opens at Santa Monica
- 1895
  - Highland Park becomes part of the City of Los Angeles.
  - Los Angeles Consolidated Electric Railway taken over by bondholders and renamed the Los Angeles Railway
  - Los Angeles Evening Record begins publication
- 1896
  - May – Congress approves $2,900,000 for deep-water harbor at San Pedro.
- 1897 – Los Angeles Country Club founded.
- 1898
  - September 1: Henry E. Huntington and Isaias W. Hellman syndicate purchase Los Angeles Railway and begin expanding it
  - March 5: Griffith Park presented to Los Angeles by Col. Griffith J. Griffith.
  - Tajo Building opens
- 1899
  - Garvanza and University district become part of the City of Los Angeles.
  - Construction begins on Los Angeles Harbor, San Pedro.

== 20th century ==
=== 1900s ===
- 1901
  - Angels Flight funicular begins operating.
  - Children's Hospital founded.
  - Redondo Beach salt works abandoned
  - November 1 – Huntington group incorporates the Pacific Electric Railway of California
- 1902
  - Tally's Electric Theater opens.
  - Los Angeles takes over water system.
- 1903
  - Los Angeles Examiner newspaper begins publication.
  - Braly Building constructed.
  - Bimini Baths open.
  - September 3 – Griffith J. Griffith shoots his wife Mary Agnes Christina Mesmer Griffith
- 1904 - Zanja Madre abandoned
- 1905
  - Los Angeles and Salt Lake Railroad begins operating.
  - Design of the seal of the City of Los Angeles adopted.
  - Southern California Buddhist Church, the first in Los Angeles, is established on Jackson Street with its first resident minister Koyu Uchida.
  - Vernon incorporated in Los Angeles County.
  - Abbot Kinney opens Venice of America
- 1906
  - Alexandria Hotel in business.
  - Shoestring strip, to connect Wilmington to Los Angeles, annexed to City of Los Angeles.
  - Glendale, Huntington Park, and Watts incorporated in Los Angeles County.
  - Art Students League of Los Angeles organized
- 1907
  - Port of Los Angeles and City Club of Los Angeles established.
  - Silver Lake Reservoir built.
  - Los Angeles Ostrich Farm and Los Angeles Alligator Farm open.
- 1908
  - Mount Wilson Observatory begins operating in Los Angeles County.
  - October 1: Construction begins on Owens River Aqueduct.
- 1909
  - Selig Polyscope Company relocates to Los Angeles.
  - City Market Wholesale Produce Terminal built.
  - San Pedro and Wilmington become part of the City of Los Angeles.

=== 1910s ===
- 1910
  - October 1: Los Angeles Times bombing.
  - East Hollywood and Hollywood become part of City of Los Angeles.
  - Trolleybus service operates Laurel Canyon.
  - New federal building and post office opens downtown.
  - Population: 319,200 city; 504,131 county.

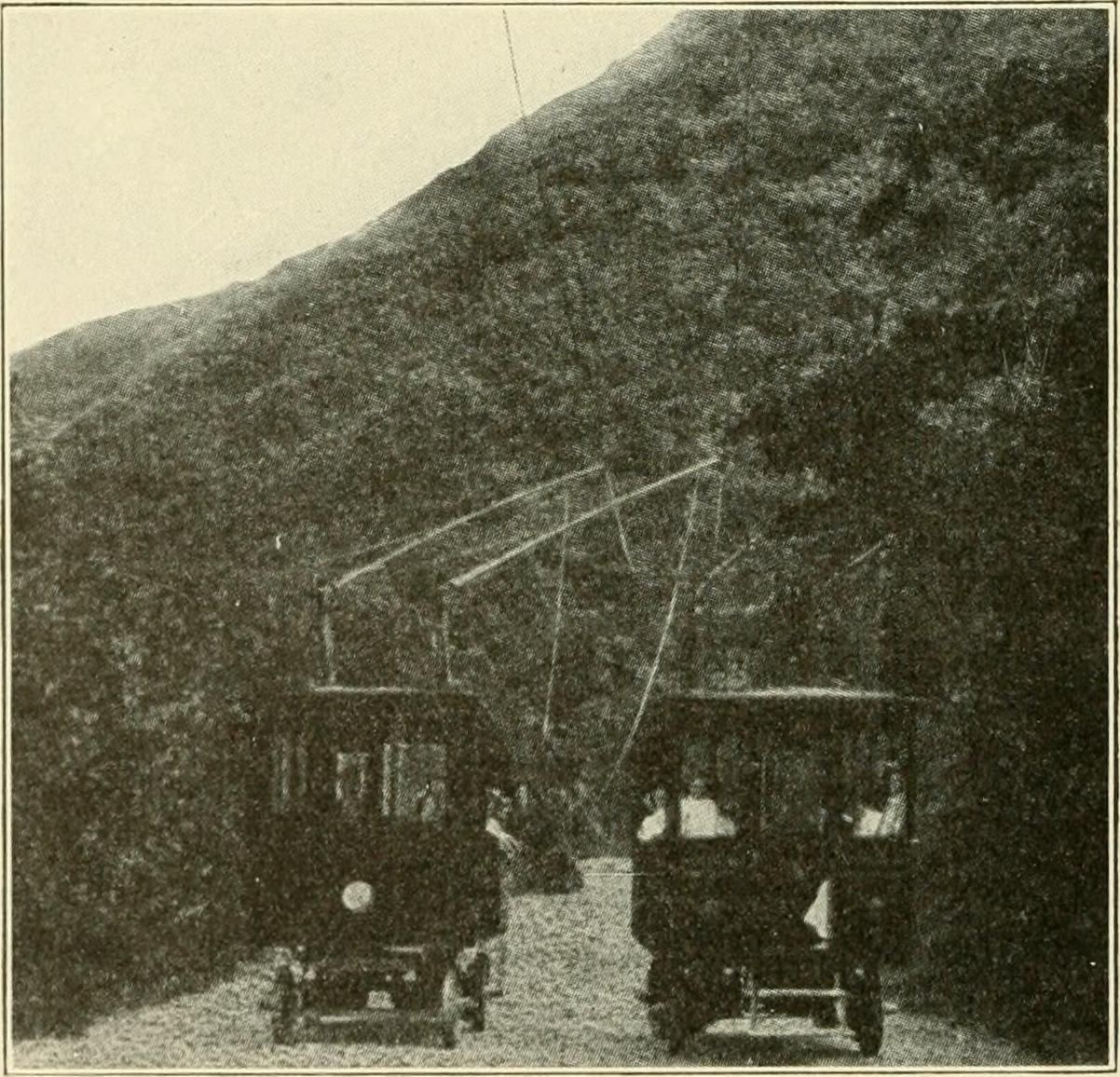
1910-1915

- 1911
  - Nestor Studios begin operating.
  - Pacific Electric Railway Company created from merger of eight streetcar companies.
  - Los Angeles College created.
  - Burbank incorporated in Los Angeles County.
  - San Fernando incorporated in Los Angeles County.
- 1912 – County of Los Angeles Public Library established.
- 1913
  - Los Angeles Aqueduct completed.
  - La Brea Tar Pits excavation begins.
  - May 13 – Long Beach pier auditorium disaster
- 1914
  - Southern Pacific's Central Station and Southwest Museum open.
  - "First ship via Panama Canal arrives."
  - Beverly Hills incorporated in Los Angeles County.
- 1915
  - March 15 – Universal Studios and Zoo grand opening.
  - San Fernando Valley becomes part of City of Los Angeles.
  - Breed Street Synagogue active.
  - Japan-Los Angeles steamship begins operating.
  - Area of city: 288 square miles.
- 1916
  - Westgate becomes part of City of Los Angeles.
  - Lincoln Motion Picture Company in business.
- 1917
  - Culver City incorporated in Los Angeles County.
  - The Southern California Buddhist Church is renamed to Hongwanji Buddhist Church of Los Angeles and is moved to Yamato Hall.
  - Gandier ordinance prohibits sale of alcohol.
- 1918
  - Warner Bros. Studios begins operating.
  - Los Angeles Philharmonic and Otis College of Art and Design founded.
- 1919
  - September – Southern branch of University of California is founded.
  - Establishment of Naval Base San Pedro.

=== 1920s ===
- 1920
  - Population: 576,673 city; 936,455 county.
  - Douglas Aircraft Company in business in nearby Santa Monica.
  - Uplifters Club buys ranchland in Rustic Canyon
  - December 20 – Abbot Kinney Pier and Ship Cafe burn in Venice
- 1921
  - May 2 – Los Angeles Steamship Company starts their five times per week overnight passenger and freight service to San Francisco.
  - Hollywood Legion Stadium opens.
  - Hollywood Masonic Temple and Hollyhock House (residence) built.
  - Watts Towers sculpture construction begins.
  - Chouinard Art Institute founded.
  - Ambassador Hotel in business.
  - Methodist Church buys land to establish community at Pacific Palisades .
- 1922
  - KFI, KHJ and KNX radio stations begin broadcasting.
  - Hollywood Bowl (amphitheater) and Grauman's Egyptian Theatre open.
  - Rose Bowl completed in Pasadena.
  - Establishment of Los Angeles Union Stock Yards.
- 1923
  - Post World War I building boom reaches its peak.
  - Hollywoodland sign erected.
  - Los Angeles Memorial Coliseum opens.
  - Biltmore Hotel in business.
  - Angelus Temple built.
  - Illustrated Daily News begins publication.
  - December – Al G. Barnes Circus winter quarters zoo opens in Del Rey
- 1924
  - Harding High School established.
  - Pneumonic plague outbreak
  - May 31 – Hope Development School fire kills 24 in Playa Del Rey
- 1925
  - Grand Olympic Auditorium opens.
  - Junior League and Yogananda Self-Realization Fellowship established.
  - A new building for the Hongwanji Buddhist Church, designed by Edgar Cline, is built.
- 1926
  - Orpheum Theatre, El Capitan Theatre, and 28th Street YMCA open.
  - June – New Central Public library building completed.
  - Shrine Auditorium rebuilt.
  - Venice and Watts become part of City of Los Angeles.
  - La Opinión Spanish-language newspaper begins publication.
  - Catalina Bird Park opens
- 1927
  - Grauman's Chinese Theatre opens.
  - May 5, Hollywood Roosevelt Hotel opens for business.
  - Barnsdall Art Park established.
  - Julian Petroleum Corporation stock scheme collapses
  - Ebell of Los Angeles clubhouse and theater opens
  - July 23 – Vernon Coliseum burns
  - August 15 – Lankershim changes name to North Hollywood
- 1928
  - Los Angeles City Hall built.
  - Christine Collins' son Walter disappears, eventually causing much embarrassment to the city's LAPD.
  - March 13: Collapse of St. Francis Dam in nearby San Francisquito Canyon.
  - Huntington Library opens in Los Angeles County.
- 1929
  - August: Graf Zeppelin (aircraft) arrives from Tokyo.
  - Academy Awards begin.
  - Los Angeles Board of Trade Building and Bullocks Wilshire department store built.
  - Nuart Theatre opens.
  - Loyola Marymount University moves to Westchester campus

=== 1930s ===
- 1930s
  - Centinela Springs drying up due to overpumping
- 1930
  - Olvera Street restored.
  - Hollywood Reporter begins publication.
  - Greek Theatre and Pantages Theatre open.
  - Highland Park synagogue built.
  - Population: 1,238,048 city; 2,208,492 county.
  - Burbank airport begins operating.
- 1931
  - The Chateau Marmont is converted from an apartment building to a hotel.
  - Figueroa Street Tunnels open.
  - The Hongwanji Temple in Kyoto confers betsuin status to their temple in Los Angeles, which is renamed as the Hompa Honwanji Los Angeles Betsuin.
- 1932
  - 1932 Summer Olympics
  - Van Nuys Municipal Building opens
  - América Tropical mural painted and destroyed
- 1933
  - March 10 – 1933 Long Beach earthquake.
  - June 6 – Frank L. Shaw becomes mayor.
  - October 3 – Griffith Park fire
  - October 12 – Los Angeles Garment Workers Strike of 1933 begins.
  - Los Angeles Sentinel newspaper and Daily Variety begin publication.
- 1934 – Los Angeles Science Fiction Society formed.
- 1935
  - Griffith Park Planetarium dedicated.
  - Kaufmann Building at Times Mirror Square opens
  - U.S. Army Corps of Engineers begins paving Ballona Creek
- 1936
  - Roman Catholic Archdiocese of Los Angeles established.
  - Crossroads of the World shopping mall built.
  - April–May – Venice celery strike
- 1937
  - Los Angeles purchases Mines Field for a municipal airport.
- 1938
  - Los Angeles flood of 1938
  - China City developed.
  - CBS Columbia Square built.
  - June 10 – Hollywood Park Racetrack opens
  - Mayor Shaw ousted; Fletcher Bowron becomes mayor.
  - Red Hynes demoted to beat cop; LAPD Red Squad disbanded
- 1939
  - Union Station opens.
  - Chandler's fictional detective novel The Big Sleep published.

=== 1940s ===
- 1940
  - Arroyo Seco Parkway opens.
  - Spring Street Courthouse opens.
  - Selig Zoo shuts down for good.
- 1941
  - Los Angeles Airport in operation.
  - Pueblo Del Rio housing complex built.
  - Turnabout Theatre of puppets established.
- 1942
  - February: Incarceration of Japanese, Germans and Italians to internment camps begins.
  - US-Mexico Bracero program begins.
  - Parking meters installed.
  - Battle of Los Angeles occurs.
  - Village Green opens
- 1943 – Ethnic Zoot Suit Riots occur.
- 1944
  - Imperial Courts and Jordan Downs housing projects built.
  - Construction begins on Park La Brea
- 1946
  - Los Angeles Rams football team active.
  - Kosher Burrito in business.
- 1947
  - KTLA television begins broadcasting.
  - Land acquired for Los Angeles County Arboretum and Botanic Garden
- 1948 – In-N-Out Burger is founded
- 1949
  - Los Angeles Valley College opens in Valley Glen
  - Construction begins on Dominguez Slough drains

=== 1950s ===
- 1950
  - Fictional Sunset Boulevard film released.
  - December 11 – Underworld attorney Sam Rummel killed in Laurel Canyon
  - Population: 1,970,358 city; 4,151,687 county.
- 1951 – Los Angeles Metropolitan Transit Authority created.
- 1953 – Four Level Interchange highway begins operating.
- 1954 – Church of Scientology and Getty Museum open.
- 1955
  - Nickerson Gardens housing complex built.
  - Disneyland amusement park opens in nearby Anaheim.
  - Bixby Slough drained
- 1956 – Capitol Records Tower built.
- 1957 – Ferus Gallery of art opens.
- 1958 – Los Angeles Dodgers baseball team active.
- 1959
  - Los Angeles Memorial Sports Arena opens.
  - Grammy Award begins.
  - KPFK radio begins broadcasting.
  - Sister city relationships established with Eilat, Israel; and Nagoya, Japan.

=== 1960s ===
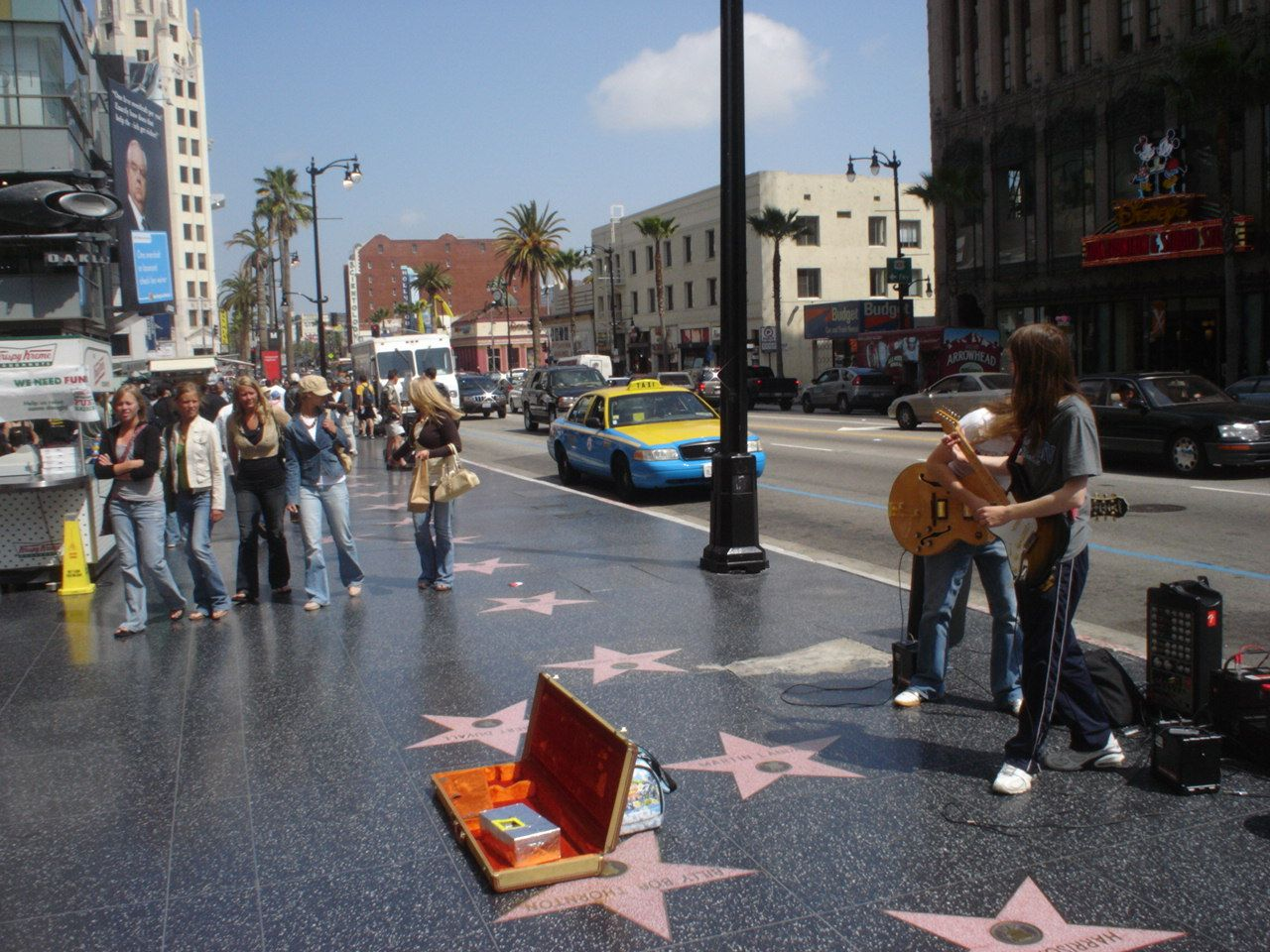
Hollywood Walk of Fame established in 1960

- 1960
  - July: 1960 Democratic National Convention held.
  - Hollywood Walk of Fame established.
  - Los Angeles Lakers basketball team active.
- 1961
  - Theme Building constructed at Los Angeles Airport.
  - Pacific Electric Railway ceases Red Car interurban operations (last line in service was Long Beach Line).
  - Bel Air Fire
  - First plantings at South Coast Botanic Garden
- 1962
  - Los Angeles Herald-Examiner newspaper in publication.
  - City Cultural Heritage Board created.
  - Dodger Stadium opens.
  - Sister city relationship established with Salvador, Brazil.
  - Los Angeles Air Force Station established
  - KMEX-DT begins broadcasting in Spanish.
- 1963
  - Last Yellow Car metropolitan streetcar service runs.
  - Vincent Thomas Bridge opens.
  - Century City development begins.
  - December 14 – Baldwin Hills Dam disaster
- 1964
  - Whisky a Go Go nightclub and Dorothy Chandler Pavilion (concert hall) opens.
  - UCLA Labor Center and Los Angeles Master Chorale founded.
  - Sister city relationship established with Bordeaux, France.
- 1965
  - August 11–17: Watts Riots.
  - Los Angeles County Museum of Art opens on Wilshire Boulevard.
  - Marina del Rey harbor opens in Los Angeles County.
- 1966
  - Los Angeles Zoo opens.
  - Gemini G.E.L. art studio founded.
- 1967
  - Super Bowl I is held at the Los Angeles Memorial Coliseum.
  - City's Community Analysis Bureau established.
  - Two California Plaza built.
  - The Advocate newsletter begins publication.
  - Mark Taper Forum (theatre) and Brockman Gallery of art open.
  - Forum (arena) opens in nearby Inglewood.
  - Los Angeles Kings hockey team active.
  - Sister city relationship established with Berlin, Germany.
- 1968
  - June 5: Assassination of Robert F. Kennedy at the Ambassador Hotel.
  - July 3: Crosby, Stills and Nash first harmonize during an impromptu meeting at the home of Joni Mitchell in Laurel Canyon. The group later came to epitomize the Laurel Canyon sound identified with L.A. into the 1970s.
  - Sister city relationship established with Lusaka, Zambia.
  - NBC true case based television crime drama Adam-12 filmed here starts, running through 1975.
  - Gerald Desmond Bridge opens.
- 1969
  - The Tate–LaBianca murders are committed by the Manson Family cult/commune/gang who are arrested by year's end.
  - Los Angeles Police Department's centennial
  - Sister city relationship established with Mexico City, Mexico.
  - Formation of the Crips and Pirus street gangs
  - Wilshire Federal Building opens
  - Carthay Circle Theatre demolished
  - November: The new Los Angeles Hompa Hongwanji Buddhist Temple is completed.

=== 1970s ===
- 1970
  - Chinatown Service Center established.
  - Former Leave it to Beaver actor Ken Osmond joins the Los Angeles Police Department
  - March – Chicano Liberation Front begins bombing spree
  - July 15 – Manson Family trial begins.
  - July 16 – Deaths of Guillermo Sanchez and Guillardo Sanchez
  - August 29 – Ruben Salazar killed
- 1971
  - January 25: Charles Manson and his cult's members are convicted of the Tate-LaBianca Murders.
  - January 28: A federal building on Los Angeles Street is bombed, killing a teenage employee.
  - February 9: 1971 San Fernando earthquake.
  - March 29: The Manson Family is sentenced to death.
  - Six Flags Magic Mountain (originally named Magic Mountain) opens in Valencia.
  - Los Angeles Convention Center opens.
  - California Institute of the Arts opens in nearby Valencia.
  - Sister city relationships established with Auckland, New Zealand; and Busan, South Korea.
- 1972
  - Womanhouse art event occurs.
  - Self Help Graphics & Art active.
  - Sister city relationships established with Mumbai, India; and Tehran, Iran.
- 1973
  - Tom Bradley becomes mayor.
  - Aon Center built.
  - Formation of the Bloods gang
- 1974
  - Security Pacific Plaza built.
  - Getty Villa opens
- 1975 – Chinese Historical Society of Southern California founded.
- 1976 – Los Angeles City Historical Society founded.
- 1977
  - X (musical group) formed.
  - President Carter makes his first visit (May 4) of three presidential visits that would happen again in May 1978 and 1979
  - Hillside Stranglers start their four month murder sprees
- 1978
  - L.A. Weekly begins publication.
  - Los Angeles Conservancy founded.
- 1979 – Sister city relationship established with Taipei, Taiwan.
  - The City Council passes Los Angeles' first homosexual rights bill on June 1 which Mayor Bradley sings on the next day, June 2.

=== 1980s ===
- 1980
  - Population: 2,966,850 city; 7,477,421 county.
  - Alfred Hitchcock's death
- 1981
  - City's bicentennial
  - Sister city relationship established with Guangzhou, China.
  - Centers for Disease Control (CDC) publishes the first report from here of symptoms of what would be later known as AIDS, with Los Angeles at least third highest reporting U.S. city for it after New York City's first and San Francisco's second, the original top three reporting U.S. cities for AIDS since.
  - Mötley Crüe formed.
  - July 1 – Wonderland murders
- 1983
  - Crocker Tower built.
  - Red Hot Chili Peppers (musical group) formed.
- 1984
  - L.A. surpasses Chicago as the second largest city in the United States.
  - 1984 Summer Olympics
  - Forever 21 clothier in business.
  - "Power of Place" group formed.
  - West Hollywood incorporated in Los Angeles County.
  - Sister city relationships established with Athens, Greece; and Saint Petersburg, USSR.
- 1985 – Latino Theater Company founded.
  - City Council passes Los Angeles anti-AIDS-discrimination bill that Mayor Bradley signs
  - August 31 – Night Stalker serial killer Richard Ramirez captured in East Los Angeles
- 1986
  - Devastating fire at the Central Library.
  - Coalition for Humane Immigrant Rights of Los Angeles established.
  - Los Angeles Opera active.
  - Sister city relationship established with Vancouver, British Columbia, Canada.
  - Proposition U passed
- 1987 –
  - Whittier Narrows earthquake;
  - Pope John Paul II visit
- 1988 – Museum of Jurassic Technology founded.
- 1989
  - U.S. Bank Tower built.
  - Sister city relationship established with Giza, Egypt.
  - Marvin Braude beachfront bike path completed

=== 1990s ===
- 1990
  - Hollywood Bowl Orchestra founded.
  - Sanwa Bank Plaza built.
  - Population: 3,485,398.
  - Sony Pictures Entertainment headquartered in nearby Culver City.
  - Sister city relationship established with Jakarta, Indonesia.
  - Metro Blue Line opens, re-establishing light rail in the city
- 1991
  - Gas Company Tower and 777 Tower built.
  - Rodney King beating
  - Maxine Waters becomes U.S. representative for California's 29th congressional district.
  - Sister city relationship established with Kaunas, Lithuania.
- 1992
  - April 29: Rodney King riots begin.
  - Koreatown Immigrant Workers Alliance founded.
  - Anthony Perkins's death
  - Sister city relationship established with Makati, Philippines.
- 1993
  - Federal trial of the four LAPD officers charged in 1991 Rodney King beating, ended with two convictions
  - Richard Riordan becomes mayor
  - Los Angeles County Metropolitan Transportation Authority created.
  - Metro Red Line opens.
  - Vincent Price's death
  - Sister city relationship established with Split, Croatia.
- 1994
  - January 17: 1994 Northridge earthquake.
  - June O.J. Simpson's second ex wife and her companion are murdered; Simpson himself becomes the suspect and is arrested after a highly covered low speed chase.
- 1995
  - O.J. Simpson murder trial
  - City website launched.
  - Los Angeles Independent Film Festival and LA as Subject project begin.
  - Drudge Report begins publication.
  - Metro Green Line opens.
- 1996
  - Loyola Marymount University's Center for the Study of Los Angeles founded.
  - Council on American–Islamic Relations Los Angeles chapter founded.
  - Museum of Television & Radio opens in Beverly Hills.
- 1997
  - American Apparel clothier headquartered in Los Angeles.
  - The Getty Center opens in Brentwood.
  - Starting crimes by Los Angeles Police Department officers that would be known as the Rampart scandal
- 1998 – Los Angeles Almanac begins publication.
  - California Science Center opens to the public.
- 1999 – Staples Center (sports arena) opens.

== 21st century ==
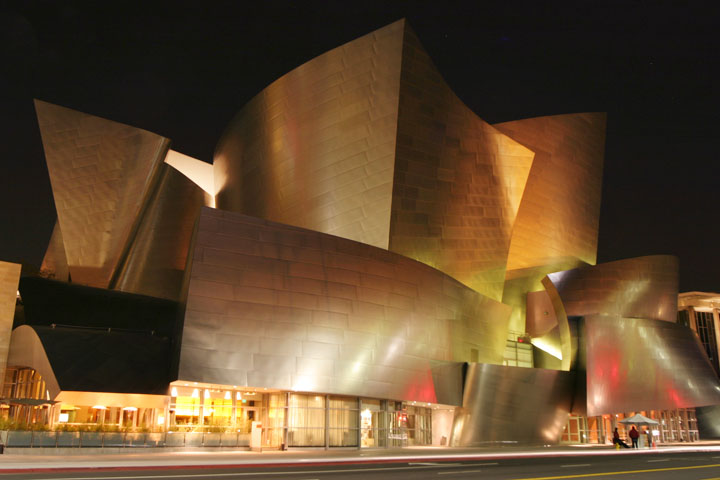
Disney Concert Hall at night

=== 2000s ===
- 2000
  - Rampart scandal report issued
- 2001
  - James Hahn becomes mayor
  - Kodak Theatre opens.
  - Disney California Adventure opens adjacent to Disneyland.
- 2002
  - Cathedral of Our Lady of the Angels built.
  - Playa Vista construction begins
- 2003
  - Walt Disney Concert Hall and Chinese American Museum open.
  - Los Angeles Derby Dolls (rollerderby) team formed.
  - Metro Gold Line opens.
- 2004 – National Day Laborer Organizing Network headquartered in Los Angeles (approximate date).
- 2005
  - Los Angeles Homeless Services Authority homeless census begins.
  - Antonio Villaraigosa becomes mayor.
  - Sister city relationship established with San Salvador, El Salvador.
  - Metro Orange Line opens.
- 2006
  - LA Weekly Detour Music Festival begins.
  - Sister city relationships established with Beirut, Lebanon; and Ischia, Italy.
  - Metro Purple Line opens.
- 2007
  - May 1: 2007 MacArthur Park rallies.
  - Los Angeles Theatre Center opens.
  - Sister city relationship established with Yerevan, Armenia.
- 2008
  - Anime Expo first arrives at the Los Angeles Convention Center
  - First DineLA Restaurant Week was held
- 2009 – Los Angeles Times' Mapping L.A. project begins.
  - Metro Sliver Line opens.

=== 2010s ===
- 2010
  - Population: 3,792,621 city; 9,818,605 county; metro 12,828,837.
  - Area of city: 503 square miles.
- 2011
  - October 1: Occupy Los Angeles begins.
  - QuakeBot in use.
- 2012
  - Metro Expo Line opens.
  - Los Angeles Review of Books begins publication.
  - Wilshire Grand Tower, the new tallest building in the city begins groundbreaking in downtown LA.
  - September 19–21: Endeavour makes final landing at LAX.
  - FIGat7th Reopens the newly constructed center happened in fall 2012.
- 2013
  - Eric Garcetti becomes mayor.
  - Population: 3,884,307.
- 2014
  - DataLA (city data website) begins publication.
  - The long-stalled Metropolis Towers breaks ground and begins construction in downtown LA.
- 2015
  - August: Shade balls put into Los Angeles Reservoir during 2015 California drought.
  - A massive natural gas leak in the Santa Susana Mountains near Porter Ranch, also known as Aliso Canyon gas leak, was discovered.
- 2016
  - Los Angeles Rams NFL football team moves back to Los Angeles.
  - ET94 Space Shuttle fuel tank arrives in LA at the California Science Center.
  - New federal courthouse on First Street opens
- 2017
  - Measure S fails
  - Los Angeles Chargers NFL football team moves back to Los Angeles.
  - Los Angeles population reaches 4 million.
  - Los Angeles is selected as the host city for the 2028 Summer Olympics.
- 2018 – Woolsey Fire burns across Los Angeles and Ventura counties.
- 2019
  - Typhus outbreak spreads in Los Angeles.
  - Bracero Monument by Dan Medina installed with 19-foot-tall featuring a bronze sculpture of a Mexican migrant and his family.
  - Teachers in LA went on strike at the beginning of the year with about 30,000 following a string of success across the country.
  - The construction of $44 million affordable housing of low income in Willowbrook, California, is now completed.
  - Construction of Oceanwide Plaza, halted in 2019 in Downtown LA.

=== 2020s ===
- 2020
  - January 26 – American professional basketball player Kobe Bryant dies in a helicopter crash.
  - Los Angeles was hardest-hit by COVID-19 pandemic, which put few thousands of residents out of work, and shifted others to work at home.
  - Oceanwide Plaza remains uncompleted as Chinese foreign real estate investment capital pulled out due to the China–United States trade war.
  - 48 apartments could replace single family home in downtown L.A.
  - Hotel-Residential project at Wilshire takes another step forward, which will be completed in 2023. There are 14 residences in affordable units.
  - May 29–31 – Civil Unrest during George Floyd protests occurs in Downtown Los Angeles, Central LA, & Santa Monica
  - September 8 – SoFi Stadium opens in Inglewood, which occupies the former site of the Hollywood Park Racetrack.
  - October 5 – Long Beach International Gateway bridge opens
  - October 11 – The Los Angeles Lakers win the NBA Finals, their first championship since 2010.
  - October 27 – The Los Angeles Dodgers win the World Series, their first championship since 1988.
- 2021
  - November 16: The naming rights of the Staples Center is acquired by Crypto.com, renaming it to the Crypto.com Arena.
- 2022
  - February 13: Los Angeles Rams win Super Bowl LVI at SoFi Stadium.
  - October 9 - 2022 Los Angeles City Council scandal, an audio recording surfaced of a private meeting involving Los Angeles City Council members and a union leader that involved racist and disparaging comments and led to a local political scandal.
  - October 12: City council president Nury Martinez resigns amid a racism scandal.
  - December 12: Karen Bass is sworn in as mayor, becoming the city's first woman to serve as mayor.
- 2023
  - May–November: The 2023 Hollywood labor disputes occur primarily in Los Angeles and New York City.
- 2024
  - April–May: Pro-Palestinian campus protests occur in a number of LA-based universities, including UCLA and USC.
  - August 15: Intuit Dome opens in Inglewood.
  - September: The Bridge Fire burns in Angeles National Forest.
- 2025
  - January 2025 Southern California wildfires
  - June 2025 Los Angeles protests against mass deportation

=== Future events ===
- 2026
  - 2026 FIFA World Cup
- 2027
  - Super Bowl LXI
- 2028
  - 2028 Summer Olympics
  - 2028 Summer Paralympics

== See also ==
- Bibliography of California history
- Bibliography of Los Angeles
- Outline of the history of Los Angeles
- History of Los Angeles
- National Register of Historic Places listings in Los Angeles, California
- Timelines of other cities in the Southern California area of California: Anaheim, Bakersfield, Long Beach, Riverside, San Bernardino, San Diego, Santa Ana

== Bibliography ==
- "History of Los Angeles City". Newmans's Directory and Guide of Los Angeles. T. Newman Publ. 1903. hdl:2027/hvd.hn3nkq.
- J.M. Guinn (1915). "How the Area of Los Angeles City was Enlarged". Publications. 9. Historical Society of Southern California.
- Los Angeles City Directory, Los Angeles Directory Co., 1915–, 1915
- Orra Eugene Monnette (1915). California Chronology: A Period of Three Hundred and Fifty Years, 1510–1860. Los Angeles: Standard printing Company.
- "Annexation and Area of City". Report of the Auditor of the City of Los Angeles, California. 1917.
- Federal Writers' Project (1941), Los Angeles: a Guide to the City and its Environs, American Guide Series, NY: Hastings House – via HathiTrust + Chronology
- Friedricks, William B. (1992). Henry Huntington and the Creation of Southern California. Columbus, OH.: Ohio University Press. ISBN 0-8142-0553-4.
- Robert Mayer, ed. (1978), Los Angeles: a Chronological & Documentary History, 1542–1976, American Cities Chronology Series, Dobbs Ferry, N.Y.: Oceana Publications
- "100 Years of Recreation and Parks" (PDF). City of Los Angeles. 1988.
- "Best of LA", Los Angeles Magazine, Emmis Communications, July 1999
- Catherine Parsons Smith (2007). "Music Chronology for Los Angeles, 1781–1941". Making Music in Los Angeles: Transforming the Popular. University of California Press. ISBN 978-0-520-93383-5.
- Kevin Starr (2007). "Chronology". California: A History. Random House Publishing Group. ISBN 978-0-307-43075-5.
- "Timeline: Driven to Despair: Los Angeles". America in Gridlock. Blueprint America. USA: Public Broadcasting System. 2008.
- "Timeline: South Central Los Angeles". Crips and Bloods: Made in America. Independent Lens. USA: Public Broadcasting System. 2008.
- Kevin R. McNamara, ed. (2010). "Chronology". Cambridge Companion to the Literature of Los Angeles. Cambridge University Press. ISBN 978-0-521-51470-5.
- "Art in Context: L.A. from 1945 to 1980 (timeline)". Los Angeles Times. September 15, 2011.
- Laura Pulido; et al. (2012). People's Guide to Los Angeles. University of California Press. ISBN 978-0-520-95334-5.
- "Los Angeles Timeline". Not For Tourists Guide to Los Angeles. Skyhorse. 2014. ISBN 978-1-62873-583-3.
- Mark Vallianatos (June 2015), "Uncovering the Early History of "Big Data" and the "Smart City" in Los Angeles", Boom, University of California
