= Timeline of Anaheim, California =

The following is a timeline of the history of the city of Anaheim, California, US.

== Nineteenth century ==
- 1858 – Settlement named "Annaheim."
- 1859 – Anaheim Water Company founded.
- 1862 – Flood.
- 1869 – Schoolhouse rebuilt.
- 1870
  - City of Anaheim incorporated.
  - Anaheim Gazette newspaper begins publication.
  - Anaheim Police Department established.
  - Population: 881.
- 1871 – City Hall built.
- 1875 – Southern Pacific railway begins operating.
- 1878 – California Brewery in business.
- 1887 – Santa Fe Railroad begins operating.
- 1889 - Orange County was founded by the California State Legislature.
- 1895 – Anaheim Chamber of Commerce established.

== Twentieth century ==
- 1902 – Anaheim Public Library established.
- 1911 – Anaheim Orange Growers Association incorporated.
- 1919
  - Anaheim Citrus Packing House built.
  - Public park established (approximate date).
- 1923 – Anaheim Morning Bulletin begins publication.
- 1938 – Los Angeles flood of 1938.
- 1941 – Prado Dam built in vicinity of Anaheim.
- 1944 – Yorba Orange Growers Association established.
- 1955 – Disneyland and Anaheim Drive-In cinema in business.
- 1966 – Anaheim Stadium opens.
- 1967 – Anaheim Convention Center and the public library's Anaheim History Room open.
- 1968 – Fox Cinemaland theatre in business.
- 1970 – Population: 166,701.
- 1972 – Anaheim Hills Golf Course opens.
- 1974 – Living Stream Ministry relocated to Anaheim (approximate date).
- 1976 – Anaheim Historical Society founded.
- 1984 – 1984 Disneyland strike occurs.
- 1987 – Anaheim Museum established.
- 1990 – Population: 266,406.
- 1991 – East West Community Church established.
- 1992 – Tom Daly becomes mayor.
- 1993
  - Arrowhead Pond of Anaheim (arena) opens.
  - Mighty Ducks ice hockey team formed.
- 1994 – South Baylo University relocated to Anaheim.
- 1997
  - City website online.
  - Loretta Sanchez becomes U.S. representative for California's 46th congressional district.
- 1998 – Anaheim Transportation Network established.
- 2000 – Population: 328,014.

== Twenty-first century ==
- 2001
  - Islamic Institute of Orange County built.
  - Disney California Adventure and Downtown Disney opens adjacent to Disneyland.
- 2002 – Curt Pringle becomes mayor.
- 2008
  - Anaheim GardenWalk opens to public.
  - Garden Walk cinema in business.
- 2010
  - Tom Tait becomes mayor.
  - Population: 336,265; metro 12,828,837.
- 2012 – July 21: Anaheim police shooting and protests begin.
- 2020 - The COVID-19 Pandemic have reached the city, which have impacted the community, society, economy, and the culture and diversity of this city.
- 2021 - The Disneyland Resort reopens

== See also ==
- Anaheim history
- List of mayors of Anaheim, California
- Timelines of other cities in the Southern California area of California: Bakersfield, Long Beach, Los Angeles, Riverside, San Bernardino, San Diego, Santa Ana

== Bibliography ==
- Lucile E. Dickson (1919). "Founding and Early History of Anaheim, California". Annual Publication of the Historical Society of Southern California. 11. hdl:2027/wu.89067327122.
- Margaret Miller Rocq (1976). "Anaheim". California Local History: A Bibliography and Union List of Library Holdings. Stanford University Press. ISBN 978-0-8047-0908-8.
- Ory Mazar Nergal, ed. (1980), "Anaheim, CA", Encyclopedia of American Cities, New York: E.P. Dutton, OL 4120668M
- Rainer Vollmar (1998). "Übersicht zu wichtigen Daten der historischen Entwicklung Anaheims (Overview of important dates in the historical development of Anaheim)". Anaheim: Utopia Americana [Anaheim: American Utopia]. Erdkundliches Wissen (Geographical Knowledge) (in German). Stuttgart: Franz Steiner Verlag. ISBN 978-3-515-07308-0.
- "Orange County: Anaheim", California, Lonely Planet, 2003, OL 8647775M
