= Timeline of Santa Ana, California =

The following is a timeline of the history of the city of Santa Ana, California, USA.

== Prior to 20th century ==
- 1877 – Southern Pacific Railroad begins operating.
- 1886 – Santa Ana incorporated.
- 1889
  - Santa Ana becomes seat of Orange County.
  - Howe-Waffle House (residence) built.

== 20th century ==
- 1901 – County Courthouse built.
- 1905 – Santa Ana Daily Register newspaper begins publication.
- 1912 – Auditorium Theatre built.
- 1919 – Orange County Historical Society founded.
- 1923 – Santa Ana Business and Professional Women's Club active (approximate date).
- 1924 – Walker Theatre opens.
- 1933 – The 6.4 M_{w} Long Beach earthquake shakes the Greater Los Angeles Area and the South Coast of California with a maximum Mercalli intensity of VIII (Severe), killing 115–120 people.
- 1935 – Santa Ana Independent newspaper begins publication.
- 1970 – Population: 156,601.
- 1973 – Orange County Historical Commission established.
- 1974 – Heritage Orange County founded.
- 1983 – Discovery Museum of Orange County founded.
- 1985 – Orange County Register newspaper in publication.
- 1988 – Habitat for Humanity of Orange County and Old Courthouse Museum established.
- 1990
  - Sikh Center of Orange County established.
  - Population: 293,742.
- 1994 – Miguel A. Pulido becomes mayor.
- 1997
  - City website online (approximate date).
  - Loretta Sanchez becomes U.S. representative for California's 46th congressional district.
- 2000 – Population: 337,977.

== 21st century ==
- 2015 – Population: 335,264.
- 2017 – Santa Ana becomes an immigrant sanctuary city.

== See also ==
- Santa Ana, California history
- Timelines of other cities in the Southern California area of California: Anaheim, Bakersfield, Long Beach, Los Angeles, Riverside, San Bernardino, San Diego

== Bibliography ==
- Ory Mazar Nergal, ed. (1980), "Santa Ana, CA", Encyclopedia of American Cities, New York: E.P. Dutton, OL 4120668M
