= Timeline of San Diego =

Coordinates: 32.715°N 117.1625°W

The following is a timeline of the history of San Diego, California, United States.

== Before the 19th century ==
- ca. 8000 BCE - 1000 CE – Paleo-Indian groups, such as the La Jolla complex and the San Dieguito complex, arrived in the region and inhabited the area.
- ca. 1000 CE – Kumeyaay migrate to the San Diego area from the east. Villages such as Kosa'aay are established in the area.
- 1542 – First European contact with the area, as Juan Rodríguez Cabrillo enters San Diego Bay.
- 1602 – Second European contact, as Sebastián Vizcaíno maps and names San Diego Bay.

=== Spanish colonization (1769-1821) ===
- 1769 – Presidio of San Diego and Mission San Diego de Alcalá established at the Kumeyaay village of Kosa'aay; first European settlements of Alta California in New Spain.
- 1774 – Mission is moved from Presidio Hill to current site 6 miles away, near San Diego River
- 1775 – Kumeyaay Revolt of 1775, Mission San Diego is sacked.
- 1778 – Pa’mu Incident, Kumeyaay revolt resulting in the first public execution sentence by colonial authorities in California (although the execution did not follow through as planned).
- 1790 – Population: 189
- 1795 – Public school opens.

== 19th century ==
- 1800 – 6.5 magnitude Earthquake
- 1804 – Province of Las Californias divided, the San Diego region becomes part of Alta California.
- 1812 – Earthquake destroys Mission San Diego de Alcalá, rebuilt the following year
- 1817 – Mission Dam and aqueduct constructed.

=== Mexican period (1821–1848) ===
- 1821 – Mexico gains its independence from Spain; San Diego becomes part of the Mexican province of Alta California.
- 1825 – San Diego becomes the unofficial capital of Alta California, under the influence of Governor Jose Maria Echeandia.
- 1826 – Presidio skirmish kills 28 Kumeyaay natives.
- 1833 – Mexican secularization act of 1833 closes Mission San Diego de Alcalá.
- 1834
  - Mission secularized; Mission lands sold or given to wealthy Californios. Missionized Kumeyaay pressured to abandon coastal regions and move inland.
  - San Diego becomes a pueblo.
  - Richard Henry Dana Jr. visits San Diego as a sailor, later writing about his experiences in the best-selling book Two Years Before the Mast.
- 1835 – Juan María Osuna is elected the first alcalde (mayor) of San Diego.
- 1836 – Alta California disestablished and merged with Las Californias under the Siete Leyes.
- 1837 – First Kumeyaay raid on San Diego.
- 1838 – San Diego loses pueblo status because of declining population amid increasing hostilities between the Californio settlers and the Kumeyaay, becomes sub-prefecture of Pueblo de Los Ángeles.
- 1840 – Population: 140.
- 1842 – Second Kumeyaay raid on San Diego.
- 1844 – Kumeyaay-Quechan blockade reaches the Pacific from the Colorado River, halting southbound overland traffic from San Diego until 1846.
- 1846–47
  - Mexican–American War
  - Battle of San Pasqual on December 6–7, 1846
  - Treaty of Cahuenga ceasefire signed January 13, 1847
- 1847 – Siete Leyes repealed, reestablishing Alta California and Baja California territories. Baja California territory is granted more land north, placing the provincial border just south of Tijuana.

=== Late 19th Century (1850s–1890s) ===
- 1848 – Treaty of Guadalupe Hidalgo (proclaimed July 4, 1848) transfers San Diego and mostly all of Alta California to the United States of America as part of the Mexican Cession territory, international border drawn closer to San Diego at a parallel "one Spanish league" south of the southernmost point of San Diego Bay.
- 1850
  - California is admitted to the United States; San Diego becomes seat of San Diego County; San Diego is granted a city charter by the California legislature. San Diego officially becomes an incorporated city.
  - William Heath Davis proposes "New San Diego" by the bay front, builds a pier and lays out streets, but proposed development is unsuccessful
- 1851
  - Herald newspaper begins publication.
  - San Diego Tax Rebellion of 1851 begins, led by Cupeño and Kumeyaay natives after San Diego County charges local natives to pay up an annual $600 in property taxes. Western theatre of the Yuma War opens up in San Diego County.
  - The Movement for State Division of California convenes in San Diego to discuss the secession of Southern California from the rest of California, as the proposed state of Colorado.
- 1852
  - Antonio Garra is tried and executed in San Diego. San Diego Tax Rebellion and the Yuma War in San Diego County ends.
  - City goes bankrupt; city charter repealed by legislature; city placed under control of a board of trustees
  - U.S. Army sets aside southern part of Point Loma for military uses, later developed into Fort Rosecrans
- 1853 – San Bernardino County breaks off from San Diego County.
- 1855 – Point Loma Lighthouse built.
- 1857 – The San Antonio–San Diego Mail Line (also known as Jackass Mail) is established, and is acquired by the Butterfield Overland Mail in 1860.
- 1858 – October: Hurricane.
- 1859 – San Diego County votes to secede from California to form the Territory of Colorado, voting 207–24 in favor of secession
- 1861 – The San Antonio–San Diego Mail Line is discontinued due to the American Civil War and the Apache Wars. All interstate commercial mail lines after the civil war would then come through Los Angeles by stage line or San Francisco by steamship until the completion of the San Diego and Arizona Railway in 1919.
- 1862 – 6.0 magnitude Earthquake
- 1866 – Louis Rose lays out town of Roseville, later incorporated into San Diego
- 1867
  - Alonzo Horton promotes move to "New Town", site of current Downtown.
  - Population: 12.
- 1868
  - City reserves 1,400 acres (570 ha) of land as City Park, now Balboa Park
  - San Diego Union newspaper begins publication.
- 1870
  - Chamber of Commerce established.
  - Horton House hotel in business.
- 1871 – City and County records are moved from Old Town to New Town, establishing New Town as the city's hub
- 1872 – San Diego incorporated.
- 1875 – Ulysses S. Grant sets aside reservation land for several Kumeyaay bands. Second round of reservations established in 1893.
- 1880 – Population: 2,637; county 8,018.
- 1881 – The Sun newspaper begins publication.
- 1882 –
  - San Diego Free Public Library established.
  - Russ High School (now San Diego High School) opens; first high school in the city.
  - YMCA established.
- 1883-1886 - John J. Montgomery makes successful flights with manned gliders at Otay Mesa, the first controlled flights in a heavier-than-air flying machine in America.
- 1885 – Santa Fe railway begins operating.
- 1886 – Horse-drawn streetcar line established downtown.
- 1887
  - Ocean Beach founded.
  - San Diego Daily Bee newspaper begins publication.
  - National City & Otay Rail Road begins operating.
  - Electric streetcar line established between Downtown and Old Town.
  - National City is incorporated.
- 1888
  - Oceanside and Escondido are incorporated.
  - Sweetwater Dam completed.
- 1889
  - City rechartered; mayor-council form of government adopted.
  - Beth Israel synagogue built.
- 1890
  - Population: 16,159.
  - Coronado is incorporated.
- 1892 – San Diego Electric Railway begins operating.
- 1893 – Riverside County breaks off from San Diego County.
- 1895 – Evening Tribune newspaper begins publication.
- 1897 – San Diego State Normal School (now San Diego State University) established.
- 1898 – Lomaland established by the Theosophical Society in Point Loma.
- 1899 - The San Diego County Bar Association, a non-profit organisation, was formed.
- 1900 - Population: 17,700.

== 20th century ==
=== 1900s–1940s ===
- 1901 – Raja Yoga Academy established at Lomaland.
- 1903 – Marine Biological Association of San Diego founded; now Scripps Institution of Oceanography.
- 1904 – Navy Coaling Station established on Point Loma; first navy establishment in the city.
- 1905 – USS Bennington (PG-4) explodes in the harbor due to a faulty boiler, killing 66 and injuring 46; burial and memorial at what later becomes Fort Rosecrans National Cemetery
- 1906 – Navy wireless radio station established on Point Loma.
- 1907 – Imperial County breaks off from San Diego County.
- 1908 – Great White Fleet visits San Diego.
- 1909
  - Scripps Building constructed.
  - Construction begins on Broadway Fountain in Horton Plaza.
  - William Smythe founds San Ysidro, later (1957) annexed to San Diego.
- 1910
  - "City Park" renamed Balboa Park.
  - U.S. Grant Hotel built.
  - San Diego Civic Orchestra active.
  - Aero Club established.
  - Population: 39,578; county 61,665.
  - Broadway Fountain completed and dedicated October 15, 1910.
- 1911 – Chula Vista is incorporated.
- 1912
  - February: San Diego free speech fight begins.
  - La Mesa and El Cajon are incorporated.
- 1913 – Cabrillo National Monument established.
- 1915
  - Santa Fe Depot opens.
  - March 9: Panama–California Exposition opens.
  - May: San Diego stadium opens; now Balboa Stadium.
- 1916
  - January–February: the "Hatfield flood", a major flood blamed by San Diegans on Charles Hatfield, a rainmaker they had hired.
  - San Diego Zoo Established
- 1917
  - Army Camp Kearny established at the site of what would later become Marine Corps Air Station Miramar.
  - Marine Corps Camp Matthews marksmanship range established at the site of what would later become the University of California, San Diego
- 1919
  - San Diego and Arizona Railway completed.
  - National Association for the Advancement of Colored People branch established.
  - Holy Cross Cemetery dedicated.
- 1920 – Population: 74,683; county 112,248.
- 1921 - U.S. Marine Corps training base commissioned.
- 1922
  - U.S. Navy Destroyer Base, San Diego established; now Naval Base San Diego.
  - Rancho Santa Fe settled near San Diego.
- 1923
  - Naval Training Center San Diego established.
  - San Diego annexes East San Diego.
- 1924 – The first United States aircraft carrier USS Langley began operating out of North Island.
- 1925
  - Mission Beach Amusement Center (amusement park) opens.
  - U.S. Naval hospital built.
- 1926
  - Star of India is towed into San Diego harbor; later renovated and opened as a museum ship
  - Fine Arts Gallery opens; now the San Diego Museum of Art.
- 1927
  - Charles Lindbergh's plane The Spirit of St. Louis is designed and built in San Diego by the Ryan Airline Company.
  - Prudden-San Diego Airplane Company in business; later Solar Aircraft Company, now Solar Turbines.
  - El Cortez Hotel built.
- 1928
  - San Diego Municipal Airport dedicated as Lindbergh Field.
  - San Diego Historical Society founded; now the San Diego History Center.
- 1929 – Fox Theatre dedicated.
- 1930 – Population: 147,995; county 209,659.
- 1931
  - San Diego State College dedicated; formerly San Diego State Normal School, now San Diego State University.
  - New city charter adopted under a council–manager form of government
  - Roberto Alvarez vs. the Board of Trustees of the Lemon Grove School District, ruled that the segregation of Mexican American elementary school children was a violation of California state laws, becoming the first school successful desegregation through the court system in the United States.
- 1933 – Aztec Brewing Company relocates to city.
- 1934
  - Ryan Aeronautical Company in business.
  - Flag of San Diego adopted.
- 1935
  - May 29: California Pacific International Exposition opens.
  - Old Globe Theatre established.
  - Consolidated Aircraft Company relocates to city.
- 1936
  - San Diego Padres established as a minor league team within the Pacific Coast League.
  - Roman Catholic Diocese of San Diego established.
- 1937 – U.S. Coast Guard Air Station San Diego commissioned.
- 1938 – San Diego Civic Center dedicated; now the San Diego County Administration Center.
- 1940
  - Marine base Camp Elliott established adjacent to Camp Kearny.
  - Population: 203,341; county 289,348.
- 1941 – Consolidated Aircraft becomes San Diego's largest employer with 25,000 employees.
- 1942
  - Residents of Japanese descent are evicted from San Diego and relocated to internment camps.
  - U.S. Marine Corps Base Camp Pendleton established near city.
  - Japanese submarine I-17 lands secretly at Point Loma before heading north to attack Santa Barbara.
- 1943
  - Consolidated Aircraft and Vultee Aircraft merge to become Convair.
  - Camp Kearny recommissioned as Naval Auxiliary Air Station Camp Kearny and Marine Corps Air Depot Miramar.
- 1945 – Navy Electronics Laboratory established, now part of Space and Naval Warfare Systems Center Pacific.
- 1946 – Submarine Group San Diego established, now part of Naval Base Point Loma.
- 1948 – Maritime Museum of San Diego established.

=== 1950s–1990s ===
- 1950 – Population: 333,865; county 556,808.
- 1951 – Jack in the Box opens its first restaurant on El Cajon Boulevard, which was also the world's first drive-thru fast-food restaurant to ever utilize a two-way intercom system.
- 1952
  - San Diego College for Women opens; now the University of San Diego.
  - Miramar Naval Air Station established.
  - Carlsbad is incorporated.
- 1953 – Urban League established.
- 1955
  - General Atomics in business.
  - Journal of San Diego History begins publication.
- 1956 – Imperial Beach is incorporated.
- 1957
  - Fort Rosecrans transferred to U.S. Navy.
  - Sister city relationship established with Yokohama, Japan.
  - San Diego annexes San Ysidro.
- 1959 – Del Mar is incorporated.
- 1960
  - University of California, San Diego and Salk Institute for Biological Studies established.
  - El Cajon Boulevard riot occurs as 3,000 protest in response to the closure of Hourglass Field in what is now San Diego Miramar College, 246 protesters arrested.
  - Population: 573,224; county 1,033,011.
- 1961
  - San Diego Chargers move to San Diego after one season in Los Angeles.
  - San Diego harbor depth was increased to 42 feet (13 m) to allow stationing supercarriers in San Diego. USS Kitty Hawk was the first supercarrier based in San Diego.
- 1962 – San Diego annexes Rancho Bernardo.
- 1963
  - Navy Submarine Support Facility established, now part of Naval Base Point Loma.
  - San Diego Aerospace Museum established.
  - Executive Complex built.
  - Vista and San Marcos are incorporated.
- 1964
  - San Diego Community Concourse and City Hall open.
  - SeaWorld San Diego opens.
  - San Diego annexes the rest of northern San Diego, making up most of today's municipal borders.
- 1965
  - UPCO (now Petco) is founded in San Diego, initially as a mail-order veterinary equipment supplier.
  - Timken Museum of Art established.
- 1966
  - San Diego International Sports Center opens, later known as San Diego Sports Arena, iPay One Center, and Valley View Casino Center, now Pechanga Arena.
  - San Diego County Comprehensive Planning Organization established, now San Diego Association of Governments (SANDAG).
- 1967
  - San Diego Stadium opens, later known as Jack Murphy Stadium, Qualcomm Stadium, and SDCCU Stadium.
  - Historical Resources Board established.
  - San Diego Rockets established in the NBA.
- 1968 - Leon Williams is appointed to the San Diego City Council, becoming the first Black member of the council.
- 1969
  - San Diego Padres established as a Major League Baseball team.
  - San Diego–Coronado Bridge and 530 B Street constructed.
  - TOPGUN United States Navy Strike Fighter Tactics Instructor program was established at Miramar Naval Air Station.
  - Sister city relationships established with Cavite City, Philippines; and León, Mexico.
- 1970
  - San Diego's Golden State Comic-Minicon begins, now San Diego Comic-Con.
  - Chicano Park established in Barrio Logan.
- 1971 – San Diego Rockets relocate to Houston to become the Houston Rockets.
- 1972
  - San Diego Wild Animal Park opens.
  - The 1972 Republican National Convention, scheduled to take place in San Diego, was moved to Miami on three months' notice; Mayor Pete Wilson proclaimed "America's Finest City Week" during what would have been convention week.
- 1975 – Centre City Development Corporation formed.
- 1976 - Sister city relationship established with Tema, Ghana.
- 1977
  - Lemon Grove is incorporated.
  - Sister city relationship established with Edinburgh, UK.
- 1978
  - NBA Buffalo Braves relocate to San Diego to become the San Diego Clippers.
  - September 25 – PSA Flight 182 crashes on approach to San Diego Airport, killing all 137 people on board and 7 people on the ground; at the time the deadliest plane crash in the U.S.
- 1980
  - Population: 875,538; county 1,861,846.
  - Poway and Santee are incorporated.
- 1981 – San Diego Trolley begins operating.
- 1982 - Sister city relationships established with Alcalá de Henares, Spain; and Jeonju, South Korea.
- 1983 - Sister city relationship established with Taichung City, Taiwan.
- 1984
  - San Ysidro McDonald's massacre kills 23 people, which became the deadliest mass shooting to have occurred in California.
  - San Diego Clippers relocate to Los Angeles becoming the Los Angeles Clippers.
- 1985
  - Westfield Horton Plaza is open for business.
  - Qualcomm is founded in San Diego.
  - Sister city relationship established with Yantai, China.
- 1986
  - Maureen O'Connor becomes the first woman elected as the mayor of San Diego.
  - Encinitas and Solana Beach are incorporated.
  - Sister city relationship established with Perth, Australia.
- 1987 - Asian Pacific Thematic Historic District is designated by the city.
- 1989
  - San Diego Convention Center opens.
  - Symphony Towers built.
- 1990 - Population: 1,110,549.
- 1991
  - One America Plaza built.
  - Sister city relationship established with Vladivostok, USSR.
- 1992 – inSITE art exhibition begins.
- 1993 - Sister city relationship established with Tijuana, Mexico.
- 1994 - City website online.
- 1995
  - May 17 – Shawn Nelson steals an M60A3 Patton tank and goes on a rampage with it before being shot and killed by police.
  - Sister city relationship established with Campinas, Brazil.
- 1996
  - August: 1996 Republican National Convention held.
  - Little Italy, San Diego is designated.
  - Sister city relationship established with Warsaw, Poland.
- 1997
  - U.S. Navy Space and Naval Warfare Systems Command ("SPAWAR") headquarters relocated to San Diego.
  - Naval Training Center San Diego closes, becomes Liberty Station over the next couple of decades.
- 1999 – Legoland California opens in nearby Carlsbad.
- 2000 – Population: 1,223,400.

== 21st century ==
- 2001 – San Diego River Park Foundation established.
- 2003 – Cedar Fire burns through hundreds of homes in Scripps Ranch.
- 2004
  - Petco Park (ballpark) opens.
  - USS Midway Museum opens on Embarcadero.
  - Sister city relationship established with Jalalabad, Afghanistan.
  - The San Diego pension scandal reached its peak.
- 2005
  - Voice of San Diego begins publication.
  - San Diego Trolley Green Line opens in Mission Valley.
- 2006 – San Diego reverts to a Mayor-council form of government on a five-year trial basis. Form of government made permanent in 2010.
- 2007
  - Roman Catholic Diocese of San Diego sex abuse trial held.
  - October 2007 San Diego County wildfires hundreds of thousands to evacuate, exceeding the number evacuated from New Orleans during Hurricane Katrina.
- 2008
  - Electra high-rise built.
  - 2008 San Diego F/A-18 crashes into University City neighborhood, killing 4.
- 2009 – Watchdog Institute (now inewsource) established at San Diego State University.
- 2010 – Population: 1,307,402; metro 3,095,313.
- 2011
  - March 18 – Harbor Drive Pedestrian Bridge opens.
  - September 8 – 2011 Southwest blackout occurs. 1.4 million customers in San Diego County are left without power.
  - October 7 - December 22 – Occupy San Diego protest movement demonstrates in San Diego stemming from the Occupy Wall Street movement in New York City. 139 were arrested.
- 2013 – Little Saigon, San Diego is designated.
- 2015
  - Sister city relationship established with Panama City, Panama.
  - Carlsbad desalination plant opens December 14, north of San Diego.
- 2016 – San Diego Chargers relocate to Los Angeles, becoming the Los Angeles Chargers.
- 2017
  - Hepatitis A outbreak occurs in San Diego, particularly in downtown, which infected 592 people and killed 20.
  - Balboa Park and Barrio Logan receive state-level designations as cultural districts from the state of California.
  - Two highest-level sports league franchises opens in San Diego:
    - San Diego Seals formed, joins the National Lacrosse League.
    - San Diego Legion formed, joins Major League Rugby.
- 2019 – Poway synagogue shooting kills one and injures three at the Chabad of Poway on the last day of the Jewish Passover holiday.
- 2020
  - Todd Gloria becomes the first person of color and member of the LGBTQ community to be elected as mayor of San Diego.
  - Horton Plaza Mall demolished.
  - Convoy (Pan Asian Cultural & Business Innovation) District is designated.
- 2021
  - SDCCU Stadium demolished.
  - The Rady Shell at Jacobs Park opens in Embarcadero Marina.
  - Mid-Coast extension extension of the San Diego Trolley Blue Line to University City, San Diego, and University of California, San Diego, opens.
- 2022
  - Snapdragon Stadium opens at the SDSU Mission Valley site. Newly formed San Diego Wave FC of the National Women's Soccer League launched.
  - Sesame Place San Diego opens in Chula Vista, replacing Aquatica San Diego.
- 2023
  - Trilateral AUKUS summit is held at Naval Base Point Loma. President Joe Biden, Australian prime minister Anthony Albanese, and U.K. prime minister Rishi Sunak announces accelerated plans to provide nuclear-powered submarines to Australia.
  - 2023 World Lacrosse Championship is held in San Diego.
- 2024
  - Atmospheric river on January 22nd floods Southeastern San Diego and National City, displacing 1,225 households and causing $31 million in damages.
  - San Diego and Tijuana hosts World Design Capital 2024.
- 2025
  - Major League Soccer launches San Diego FC at Snapdragon Stadium and is partially owned by the Sycuan Band of the Kumeyaay Nation.
  - May 22 – a private Cessna Citation II crashed in Murphy Canyon in Tierrasanta, killing all six aboard the aircraft.
  - Sister city relationship established with Marseille, France.
- 2026 – 2026 Islamic Center of San Diego shooting kills 3 at the Islamic Center of San Diego in Clairemont.

== See also ==
- History of San Diego
- List of pre-statehood mayors of San Diego
- List of mayors of San Diego (since 1850)
- List of San Diego Historic Landmarks
- Timeline of Tijuana history
- Timeline of California
- Timelines of other cities in the Southern California area of California: Anaheim, Bakersfield, Long Beach, Los Angeles, Riverside, San Bernardino, Santa Ana

== Bibliography ==
=== Published in the 19th century ===
- "General Description of San Diego County", Hand-book and Directory of San Luis Obispo, Santa Barbara, Ventura, Kern, San Bernardino, Los Angeles & San Diego Counties, San Francisco: L.L. Paulson, 1875
- "San Diego" . Encyclopædia Britannica. Vol. 21 (9th ed.). 1886.
- "San Diego City", Place's Southern California Guide Book, Los Angeles: G.E. Place & Co., 1886
- Maxwell's Directory of San Diego City and County, Geo. W. Maxwell, 1887
- San Diego City and County Directory, Olmstead Company, 1895
  - 1899

=== Published in the 20th century ===
- San Diego City and County Directory, San Diego Directory Co., 1901
  - 1909, 1916, 1923, 1925
- "San Diego" . Encyclopædia Britannica. Vol. 24 (11th ed.). 1910. p. 140.
- Clarence Alan McGrew (1922), City of San Diego and San Diego County, Chicago: American Historical Society, OL 13492998M
- Federal Writers' Project (1937), San Diego: A California City, American Guide Series, San Diego Historical Society, hdl:2027/mdp.39015066092878
- Robert Mayer (1978), Howard B. Furer (ed.), San Diego: a chronological & documentary history, 1535–1976, American Cities Chronology Series, Dobbs Ferry, N.Y.: Oceana Publications, ISBN 0379006138
- Ory Mazar Nergal, ed. (1980), "San Diego, CA", Encyclopedia of American Cities, New York: E.P. Dutton, OL 4120668M
- Robert W. Duemling (1981), San Diego and Tijuana: conflict and cooperation between two border communities; a case study, Executive Seminar in National and International Affairs, Rosslyn, Va.: U.S. Department of State, Foreign Service Institute
- Gregg R. Hennessey (1993). "San Diego, the U.S. Navy, and Urban Development: West Coast City Building, 1912–1929". California History. 72 (2): 128–149. doi:10.2307/25177342. JSTOR 25177342.
- Abraham Shragge (1994). "'A New Federal City': San Diego during World War II". Pacific Historical Review. 63 (3): 333–361. doi:10.2307/3640970. JSTOR 3640970.
- "San Diego", California, Let's Go, New York: St. Martin's Press, 1998, OL 10387102M

=== Published in the 21st century ===
- Glen Sparrow (2001). "San Diego-Tijuana: Not quite a binational city or region". GeoJournal. 54 (1): 73–83. doi:10.1023/A:1021144816403. JSTOR 41147639. S2CID 153015715.
- Laura A. Schiesl (2001). "Problems in Paradise: Citizen Activism and Rapid Growth in San Diego, 1970–1990". Southern California Quarterly. 83 (2): 181–220. doi:10.2307/41172070. JSTOR 41172070.
- Albert S. Broussard (2006). "Percy H. Steele, Jr., and the Urban League: Race Relations and the Struggle for Civil Rights in Post-World War II San Diego". California History. 83 (4): 7–23. doi:10.2307/25161838. JSTOR 25161838.
