= Timeline of Long Beach, California =

The following is a timeline of the history of the city of Long Beach, California, USA.

== Prior to 20th century ==
- 1884 – Willmore City renamed "Long Beach."Los Angeles Herald June 13, 1884 p.6}
- 1895 – Long Beach Public Library founded.
- 1897 – Long Beach was incorporated.

== 20th century ==
- 1902 – The Pike amusement area begins operating.
- 1908 – Office of mayor established.

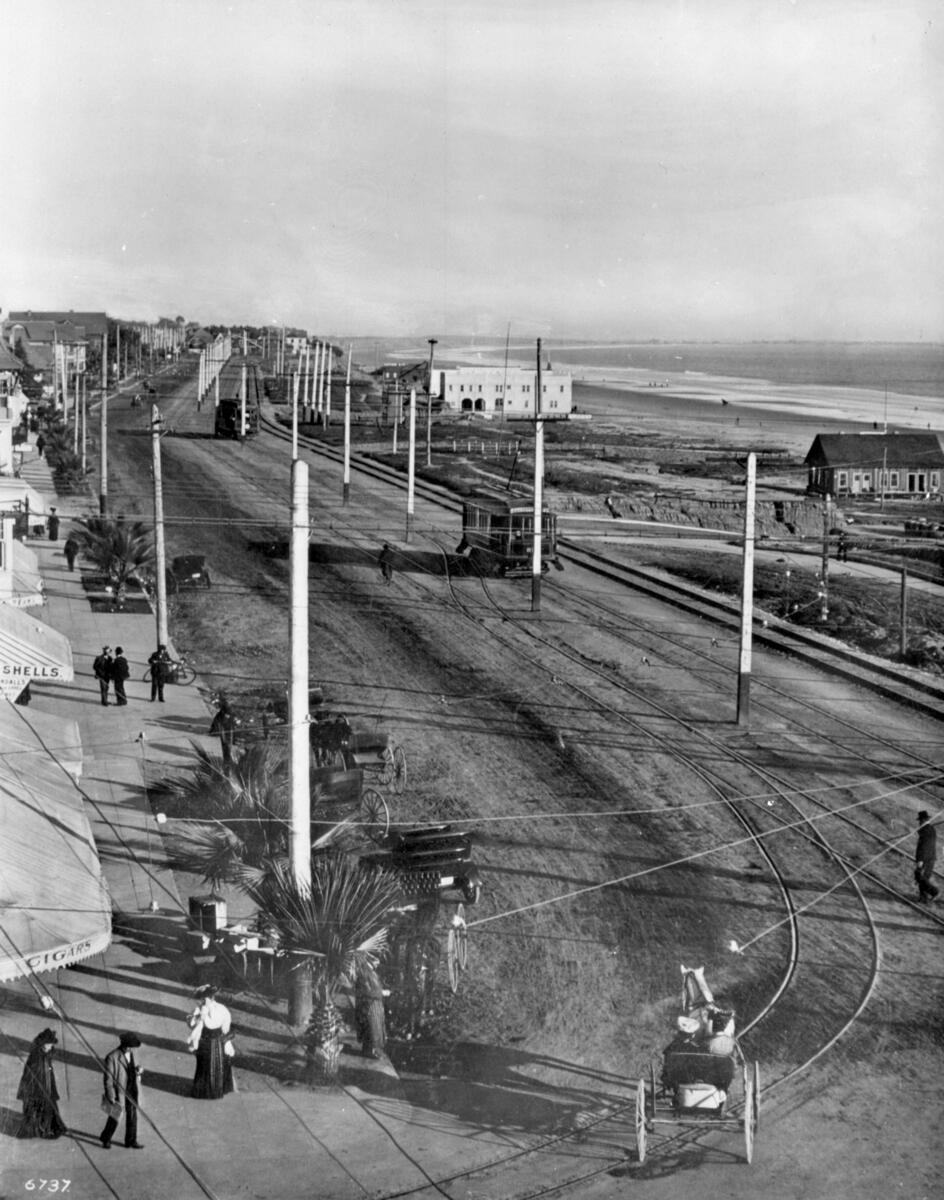
Ocean Avenue looking south from Pine Avenue, c. 1910

- 1911 – Port of Long Beach dedicated.
- 1913 – Long Beach pier auditorium disaster kills 39.
- 1921 – Long Beach Oil Field discovered at Signal Hill.

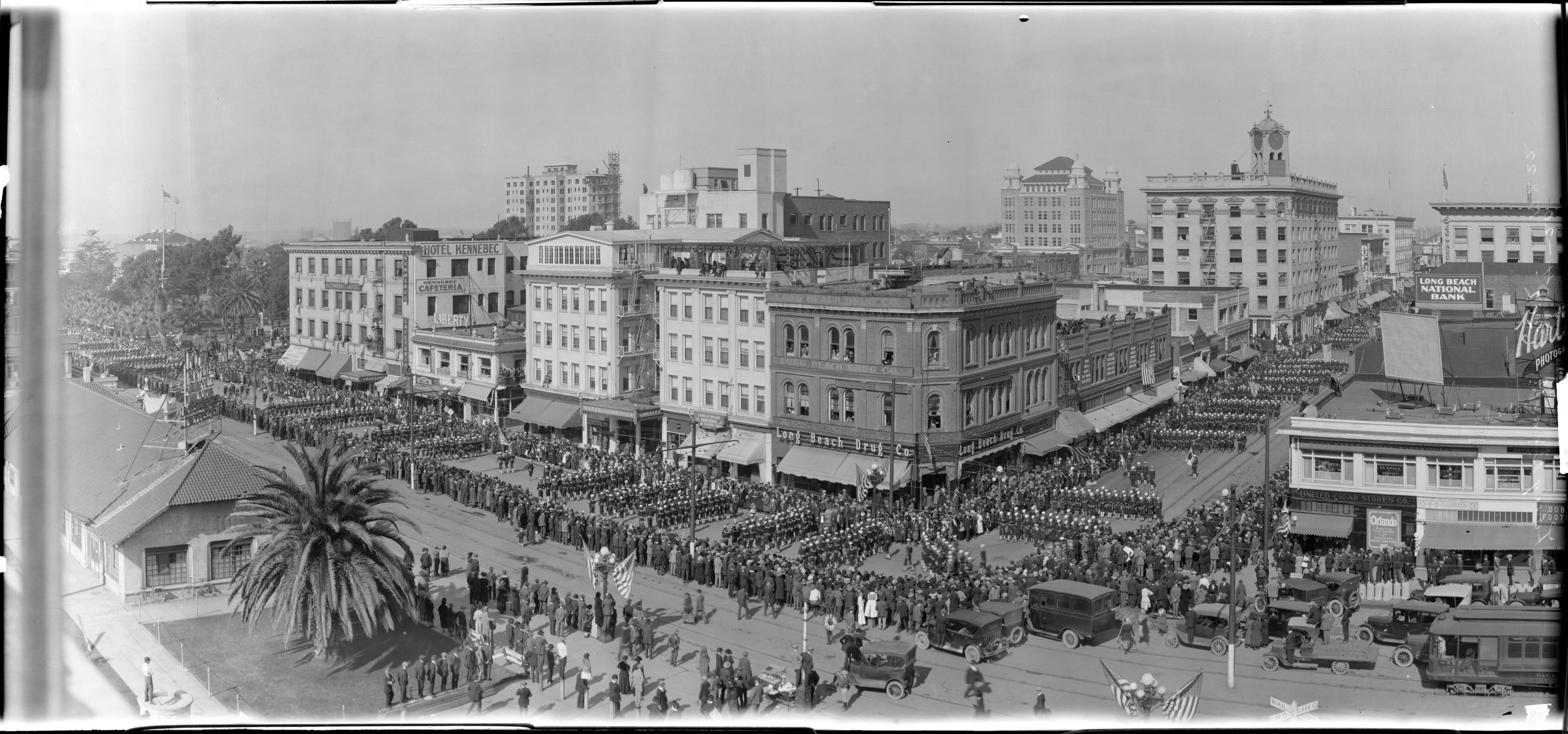
Armistice Day parade on Pine Ave. and Ocean Blvd., 1922

- 1923 – Daugherty Field (airfield) established.
- 1924
  - City Gas Department established.
  - Argus newspaper in publication.
  - City of Signal Hill incorporated in vicinity of Long Beach.
- 1925 – Brayton Theatre opens.

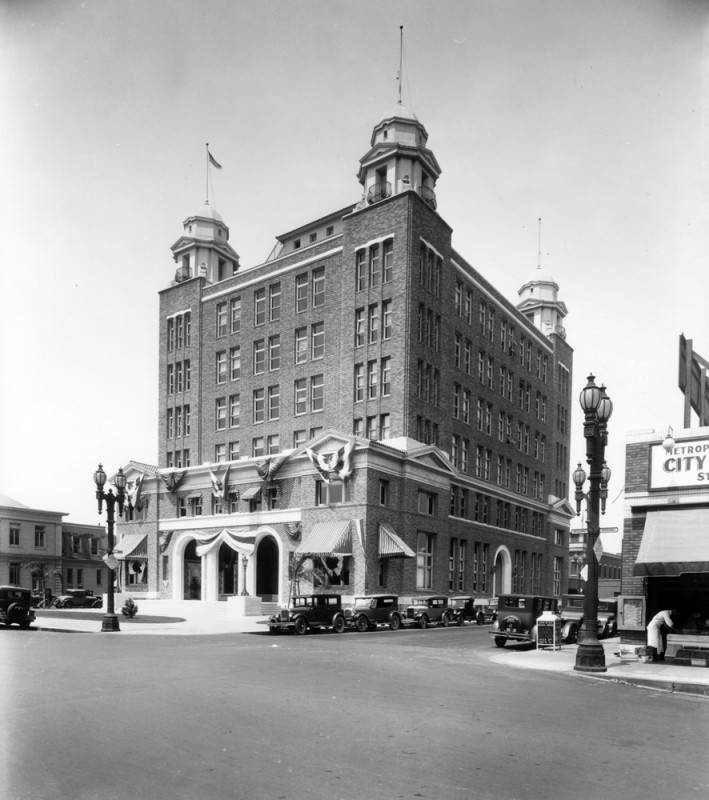
Long Beach City Hall, c. 1928

- 1929 – Long Beach Public Library's Alamitos branch built.
- 1930 – Population: 142,032.
- 1932 – Municipal Auditorium opens.
- 1933 – March 10: The 6.4 M_{w} Long Beach earthquake affects the Greater Los Angeles Area with a maximum Mercalli intensity of VIII (Severe), leaving 115–120 people dead, and causing an estimated $40 million in damage.
- 1934 – Long Beach Main Post Office built.

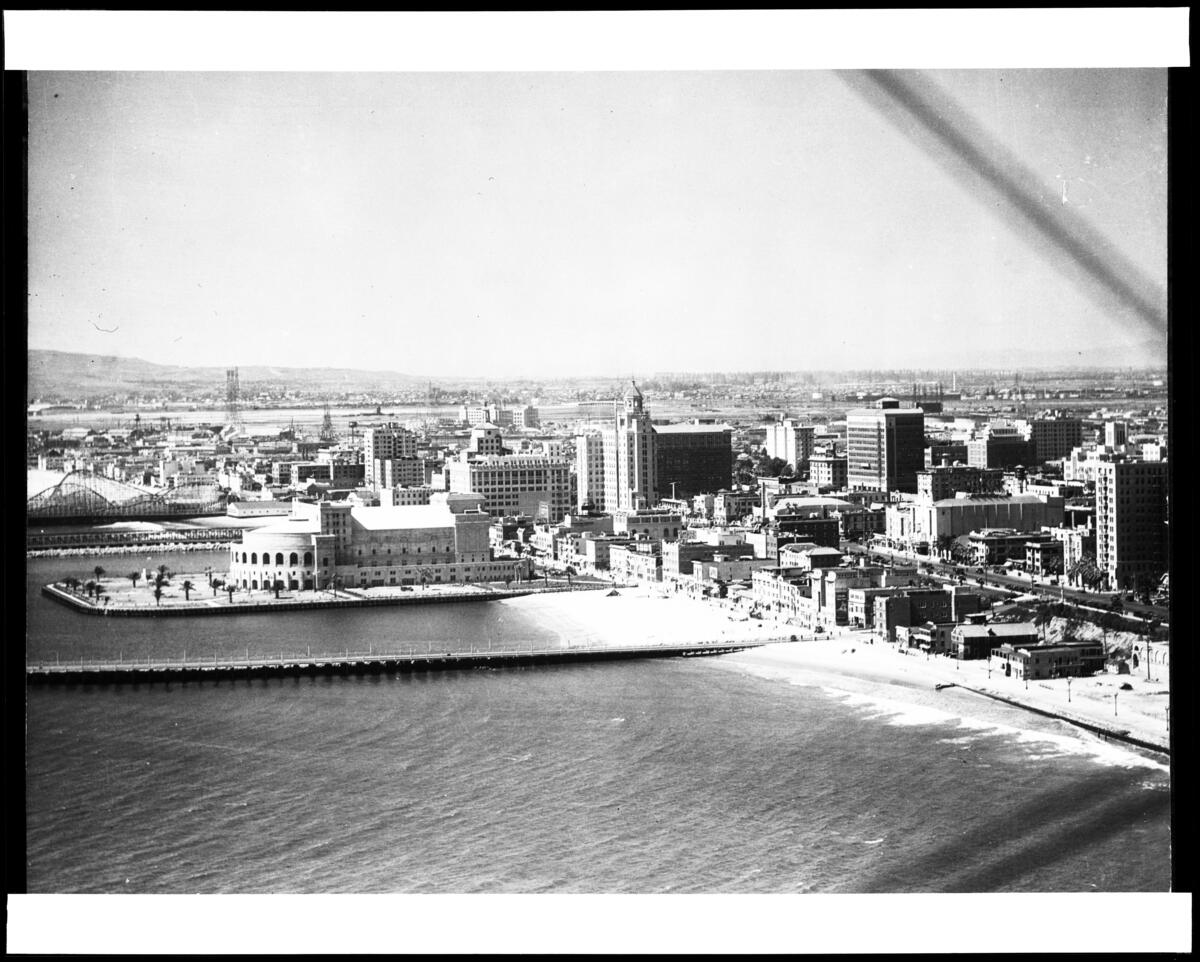
Aerial view of Municipal Auditorium and Rainbow Pier, c. 1935

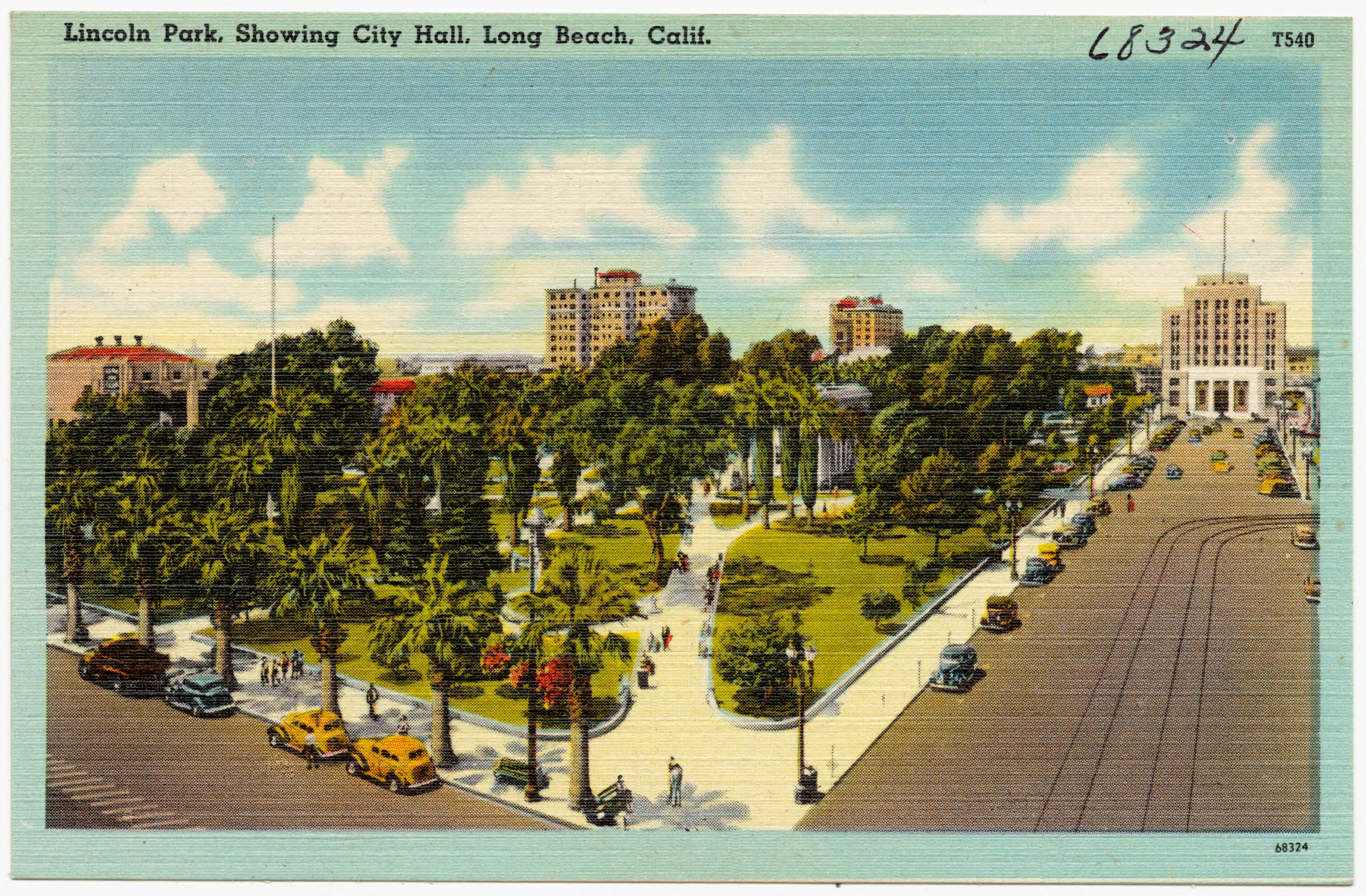
Lincoln Park, the city's oldest park, depicted on a postcard, c. 1930–1945

- 1940 – Population: 164,271.
- 1943 – US Naval Dry Docks established on Terminal Island.
- 1945 – Press-Telegram newspaper in publication.
- 1947 – November 2: Spruce Goose aircraft takes flight.
- 1949 – Los Angeles-Orange County State College opens.
- 1950
  - Long Beach Museum of Art founded.
  - Population: 250,767.
- 1951 – Circle Drive-In cinema in business.
- 1952 – Miss USA and Miss Universe beauty pageants held in city.
- 1954 – Long Beach State 49ers baseball team formed.
- 1962 – Historical Society of Long Beach founded.
- 1967 - RMS Queen Mary arrives
- 1972 – California State University, Long Beach active.
- 1975 – Grand Prix of Long Beach begins.
- 1977 – Long Beach Public Library's main branch rebuilt.
- 1978 – Chua Phat To (Buddhist center) founded.
- 1981 – Earl Burns Miller Japanese Garden dedicated.
- 1984 – Ernie Kell becomes mayor.
- 1986 – Long Beach Heritage nonprofit founded.
- 1990 – Population: 429,433.
- 1994
  - Beverly O'Neill becomes mayor.
  - Gray Panthers of Greater Los Angeles headquartered in city.
- 1996 – City website online (approximate date).
- 1998
  - Greater Long Beach Interfaith Community Organization established.
  - Aquarium of the Pacific opens
- 1999 – Long Beach Towne Center (shopping area) opens.

== 21st century ==
- 2000 – Population: 461,522.
- 2001 – Society for the Prevention of Cruelty to Animals Los Angeles (spcaLA) and the City of Long Beach open the spcaLA P.D. Pitchford Companion Animal Village & Education Center, the first public-private partnership for animal welfare in the United States.
- 2006 – Bob Foster becomes mayor.
- 2010 – Population: 462,257; metro 12,828,837.
- 2013
  - Harvey Milk Park opens.
  - Alan Lowenthal becomes U.S. representative for California's 47th congressional district.
- 2014 – Robert Garcia becomes mayor.
- 2022
  - Waterfront offices could make way for housing, which was sold by ValueRock Realty and Holland Partner Group's move is also known poised to be redeveloped with lifestyle housing and style.
  - The Shoreline Gateway development in this city is complete, which represents the growth of Long Beach city, both past and present. The tallest tower in Long Beach features 315 luxury apartments on building's upper floors, with about 6,500 square feet of commercial space and a five-level, and even 470-car subterranean parking garage below. Companies including Studio One Eleven, Carrier Johnson + Culture, and Relm have worked on main designment and construction on this project. Back times in 2004, this project was first proposed under, which was the now defunct Long Beach Community.

== See also ==
- Long Beach, California history
- List of mayors of Long Beach, California
- List of City of Long Beach historic landmarks
- National Register of Historic Places listings in Los Angeles County, California
- Timelines of other cities in the Southern California area of California: Anaheim, Bakersfield, Los Angeles, Riverside, San Bernardino, San Diego, Santa Ana

== Bibliography ==
- "Directory of Long Beach, Terminal and San Pedro 1899–1900" – via Long Beach Public Library, Digital Archive.
- Walter Case. History of Long Beach and Vicinity. Chicago: S.J. Clarke Publishing Company, 1927.
- Federal Writers' Project (1939), "Long Beach", California: Guide to the Golden State, American Guide Series, New York: Hastings House, pp. 201+ – via Open Library
- Ory Mazar Nergal, ed. (1980), "Long Beach, CA", Encyclopedia of American Cities, New York: E.P. Dutton, pp. 197+, OL 4120668M
- Fortune's Harbor. Larry Meyer and Pat Kalayjian, 1983
- The Golden Shore. Richard DeAtley, 1988
- The City and its People. Bill Hillburg, 2000.
- "Long Beach timeline: From land grant to redevelopment", Orange County Register, August 2013
