= Timeline of Bakersfield, California =

The following is a timeline of the history of the city of Bakersfield, California, USA.

== Prior to 20th century ==
- 1873 – City of Bakersfield incorporated.
- 1888 – Bakersfield and Kern Electric Railway begins operating.
  - July 7: Great Bakersfield Fire of 1889.
  - Oil discovered.
  - Bakersfield (Southern Pacific station) opens.

== 20th century ==
- 1904 – Beale Memorial Clock Tower built.
- 1907 – The Bakersfield Californian newspaper in publication.
- 1910 – Kern becomes part of Bakersfield.
- 1921 – Central Park established.
- 1928 – Kern County Chamber of Commerce Building and Padre Hotel constructed.
- 1929 – Hart Park opens.
- 1930 – Fox Theater in business.
- 1945 – Kern County Museum opens.
- 1952 –
  - July 21 – The 7.3 M_{w} Kern County earthquake affected the southern San Joaquin Valley with a maximum Mercalli intensity of XI (Extreme), killing 12 and injuring hundreds in the region.
  - August 22 – A 5.8 M_{w} aftershock affected Bakersfield with a maximum Mercalli intensity of VIII (Severe), killing two and causing an additional $10 million in damage.
- 1954 – Bakersfield City Hall built.
- 1955 – Memorial Stadium opens.
- 1961 – Sister city relationship established with Wakayama, Japan.
- 1962 – Bakersfield News Bulletin begins publication.
- 1963 – Crest Drive-In cinema in business.
- 1964 – Goodwill thrift shop in business.
- 1965 – Community Action Partnership of Kern established.
- 1976 – Bakersfield Department of Water Resources established.
- 1977
  - December: Great Bakersfield Dust Storm of 1977.
  - Mesa Marin Raceway opens.
- 1980 – California Living Museum (zoo) founded.
- 1983 – County Food Bank established.
- 1990
  - Hindu Temple of Kern County founded.
  - Population: 174,820.
- 1996 – Buck Owens Crystal Palace (music hall) opens.
- 2000
  - Bakersfield (Amtrak station) opens.
  - Population: 247,057.

== 21st century ==
- 2001 – Harvey Hall becomes mayor.
- 2006 – River Walk Park opens.
- 2007
  - Kern Veterans Memorial unveiled.
  - Kevin McCarthy becomes U.S. representative for California's 22nd congressional district.
- 2009
  - Mill Creek linear park opens.
  - Bakersfield 16 Cinema in business.
- 2013 – Kern County Raceway Park opens.

== See also ==
- Bakersfield, California history
- Timelines of other cities in the Southern California area of California: Anaheim, Long Beach, Los Angeles, Riverside, San Bernardino, San Diego, Santa Ana

== Bibliography ==
- Margaret Miller Rocq (1976). "Kern County". California Local History: A Bibliography and Union List of Library Holdings. Stanford University Press. ISBN 978-0-8047-0908-8.
