= Casa de San Pedro =

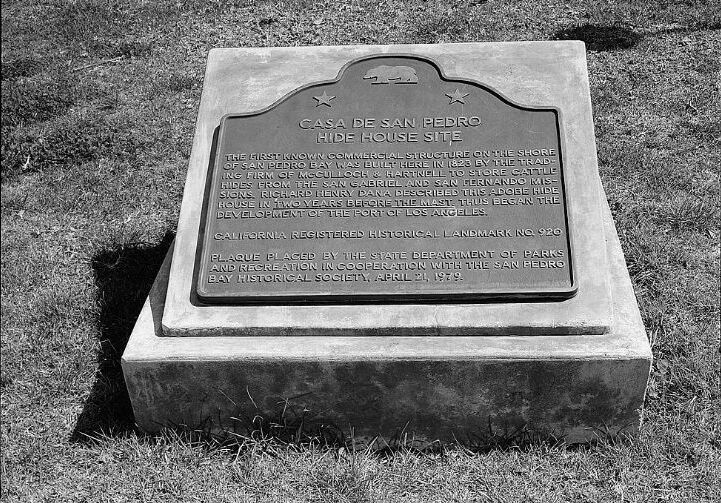
- Casa de San Pedro Hide House Marker

- Location within the Los Angeles metropolitan area
- 33°43′14″N 118°17′7″W
- Location: Fort MacArthur in San Pedro

History
- Built: 1823

California Historical Landmark
- Designated: June 6, 1978
- Reference no.: 920

Casa de San Pedro was a hide house and one of the oldest commercial structure on the San Pedro Bay. Its site was designated a California Historic Landmark, No. 235, on June 6, 1978. The site is now near Meyler St. and Quartermaster Road in San Pedro.

McCulloch and Hartnell built the structure to store cattle hides purchased from the Mission San Gabriel Arcángel and San Fernando mission. In 1829 the Casa was sold to Mission San Gabriel. In 1834 the Casa was sold to Abel Stearns. Stearns established a stagecoach route connecting San Pedro Bay with the Pueblo de Los Ángeles. Casa de San Pedro is described as an adobe hide house in the book Two Years Before the Mast by Richard Henry Dana published in 1840. Casa de San Pedro was part of the beginning of the Port of Los Angeles.

In 1846 the Mexican governor of Alta California, Pío Pico, directed that a 500-vara-square of land (43 acres) facing onto San Pedro Bay be set aside as a government reservation. In 1904 surveyor H.H. Burton inspected Casa de San Pedro for the San Pedro Government Reservation. Burton reported that the Casa was a "ruins of adobe buildings". A legal dispute over this land, being enclosed by what would become Fort MacArthur, ended in 1922.

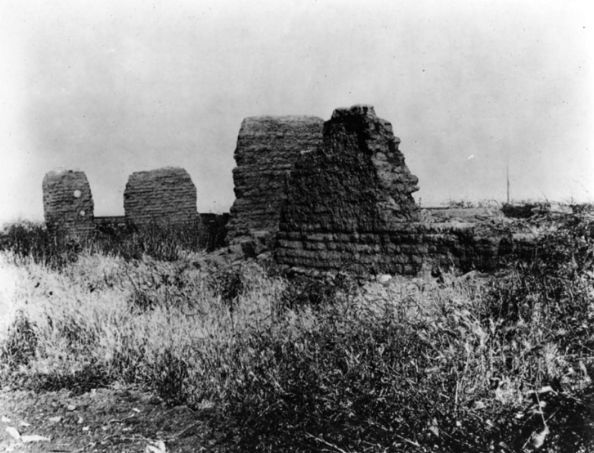
Casa de San Pedro ruins in 1900

A plaque marking the site of Casa de San Pedro is near the Chaldean's play yard on Quartermaster Road. The plaque reads:

The first known commercial structure on the shore of San Pedro Bay was built here in 1823 by the trading firm of McCulloch & Hartnell to store cattle hides from the San Gabriel and San Fernando Missions. Richard Henry Dana described this adobe hide house in Two Years Before The Mast. Thus began the development of the Port of Los Angeles.

== See also ==
- California Historical Landmarks in Los Angeles County
- List of California Ranchos
- Ranchos of Los Angeles County, California
