= Philippe Abraham Peticolas =

Early American artist (1760–1841)

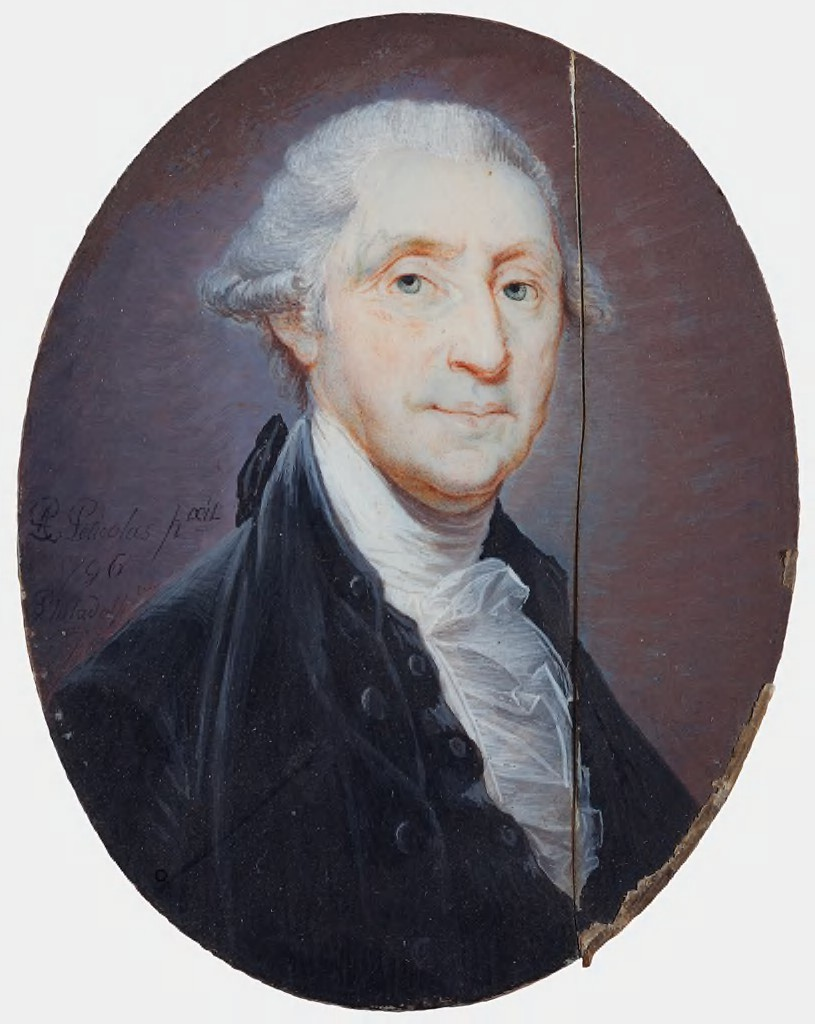
Portrait miniature of George Washington by Peticolas (Harvard Art Museum)

Philippe Abraham Peticolas (1760 – 1841) was an early American artist known for his portraits and miniatures. He was born in Ardennes, France.

He worked primarily in Richmond, Virginia. His sons were also notable creatives of antebellum Virginia.
