= Sherry Peticolas =

American sculptor (1904–1956)

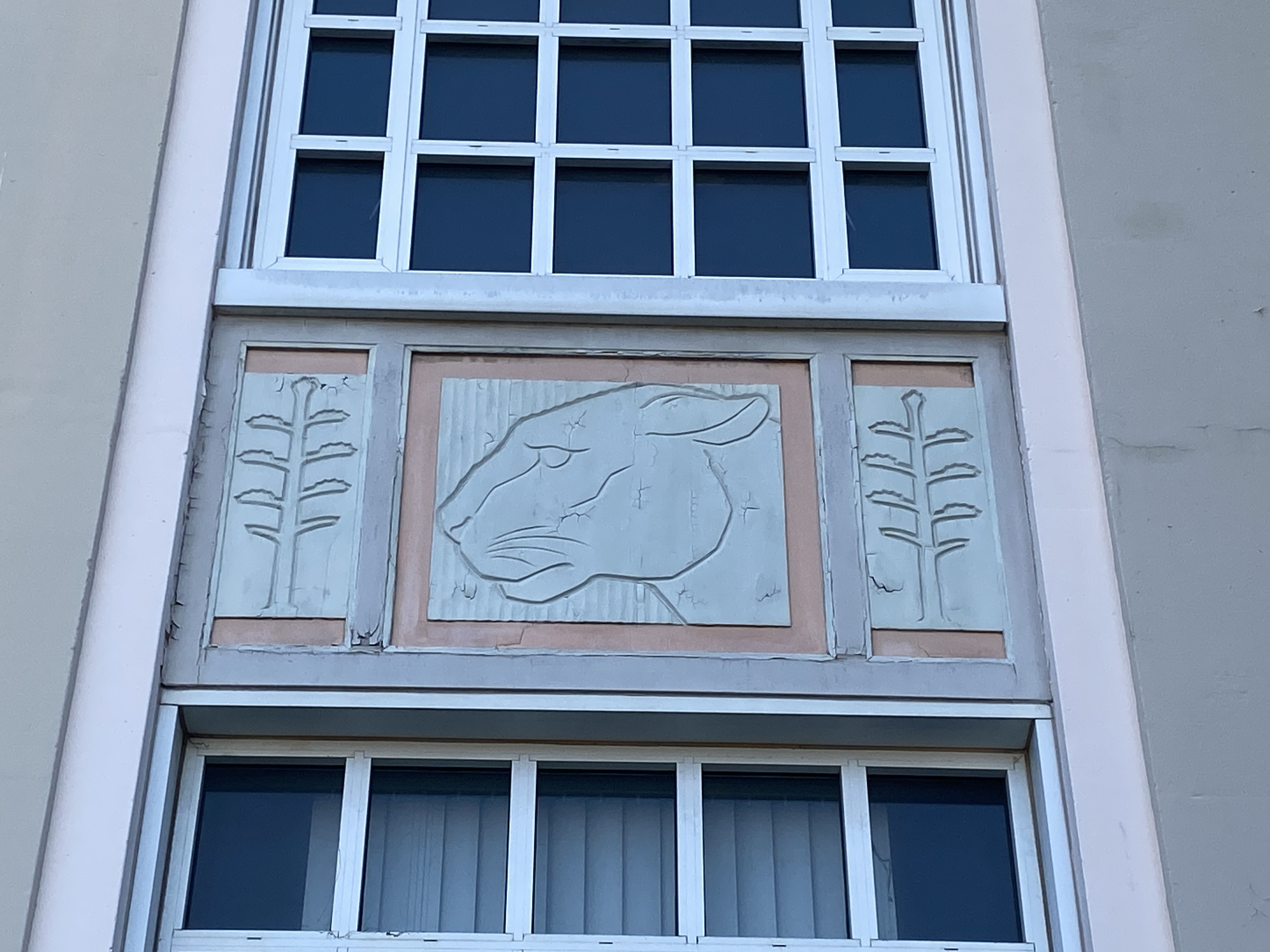
Cougar bas relief, Inglewood post office, collaboration between Peticolas and Gordon Newell

Sherman Goodwin Peticolas Jr. (February 19, 1904 – May 3, 1956), known as Sherry Peticolas, was an American sculptor and art teacher active in Los Angeles, California, United States in the first half of the 20th century.

== Education and career ==
Peticolas studied with Merrell Gage and Tolles Chamberlain and at the Chouinard Institute. He also studied with Gutzon Borglum and worked as his assistant for a time. He started showing with the Painters' and Sculptors' Club in 1930. In 1934 Peticolas was one of three collaborators, along with Henry Lion and Jason Herron, who created a Public Works of Art piece in cast concrete called Water Power, for Lafayette Park. Peticolas created a death mask of Charlotte Perkins Gilman in 1935. His best-known work, the colossal statue of Juan Bautista de Anza at Newman Park in Riverside, was installed in 1940. He also sculpted Fountain Figure at Bonita Union High School in La Verne, Alexander Hamilton at Alexander Hamilton High School. a statue installed at Frank Wiggins Trade School (now L.A. Trade Tech), and granite finials for Memorial Park in Redlands.

Peticolas served as supervisor of sculpture for the Federal Art Project in Southern California. With Gordon Newell he created bas reliefs for post office buildings in Colton, Hollywood, Inglewood, and San Fernando, California as part of the Treasury Relief Art Project of the U.S. Treasury Department.

Peticolas also taught sculpture at Otis Art Institute.

== Personal life ==
Born in Waterloo, Iowa, Peticolas moved to Los Angeles in 1926. Peticolas was married first to Helen, with whom he had two children, David and Norma. Peticolas was married second to the ceramicist Gwynne Hill (born Mary Edna Hutchinson). Peticolas died of peritonitis while was Gwynne was overseas in Japan adopting a little boy who had been fathered by an American GI after World War II.

Some biographies of Peticolas, including in Edan Milton Hughes' Artists in California, 1786–1940, have mistakenly described him using she/her pronouns.

== See also ==
- United States Post Office (Hollywood, Los Angeles)
