= History of Riverside, California =

Riverside, California, was founded in 1870, and named for its location beside the Santa Ana River. It became the county seat when Riverside County, California, was established in 1893.

== Precolonial period ==
Prior to the colonization of Mexico and Alta California by Spain, the land that would become Riverside, California, was frequented by various Native American people. No permanent settlements are known to have existed, but occasional villages close to the river were documented by later explorers. Artifacts found at White Sulphur Springs, as well as grain grinding holes in rocks south of Mount Rubidoux, provide evidence of the Native American activity.

== Spanish period ==
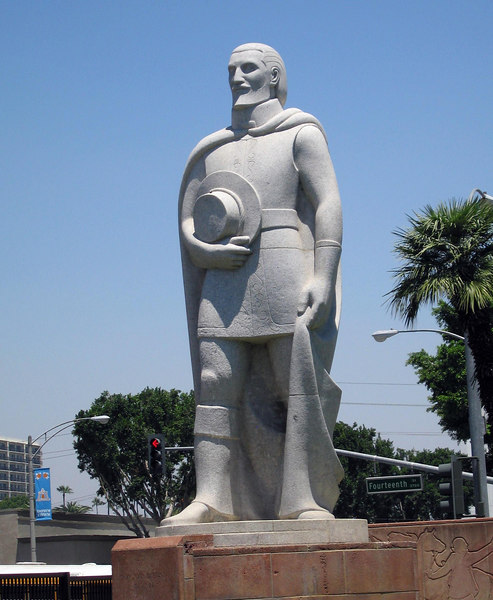
Sherry Peticolas's statue of Juan Bautista de Anza in Riverside, California

On March 20, 1774, Juan Bautista De Anza, leading an exploratory expedition to find a good land route from southern Mexico to Alta California, reached the area today known as Riverside. He, and others in his contingent, described the area as a beautiful place fragrant with rosemary and other herbs, and having rich grasslands for their horses and cattle to graze. He named the area Valle de Paraiso, or Valley of Paradise. This was the first official record made of what was to become the city of Riverside.

De Anza led a second expedition through the area on December 31, 1775. This expedition was a colonizing expedition headed for Monterey. They spent New Year's Eve on the banks of the Santa Ana River, and crossed the river the following day.

The routes taken by the two expeditions are believed to have followed a course from somewhere near Lake Perris, in current-day Moreno Valley, down the Box Springs grade near the 60/215 Highway interchange, and across Riverside in the direction of the Martha McLean – Anza Narrows park. A marker in the park was dedicated to recognize the point where the group crossed the Santa Ana River. To commemorate De Anza's expeditions, the city of Riverside, through private donations and a federal grant from the Works Progress Administration, began work on a 20-foot statue of De Anza in 1939. The dedication took place in May, 1942, at the corner of Market and 14th streets.

== American period ==
The California Silk Center Association was established in November, 1869, and included some of the land that would later become Riverside. The Association dissolved in April, 1870, when Louis Prevost, the only member of the Association knowledgeable on silk farming, died unexpectedly. On September 12, 1870, the Southern California Colony Association of Jurupa was formed, and on September 14 they purchased much of the Silk Association's land and water rights. Initially the new colony was referred to as Jurupa, for the name of the original Rancho that occupied the area, but the Colony Association formally adopted the name Riverside on December 18, 1870.

=== Citrus history ===
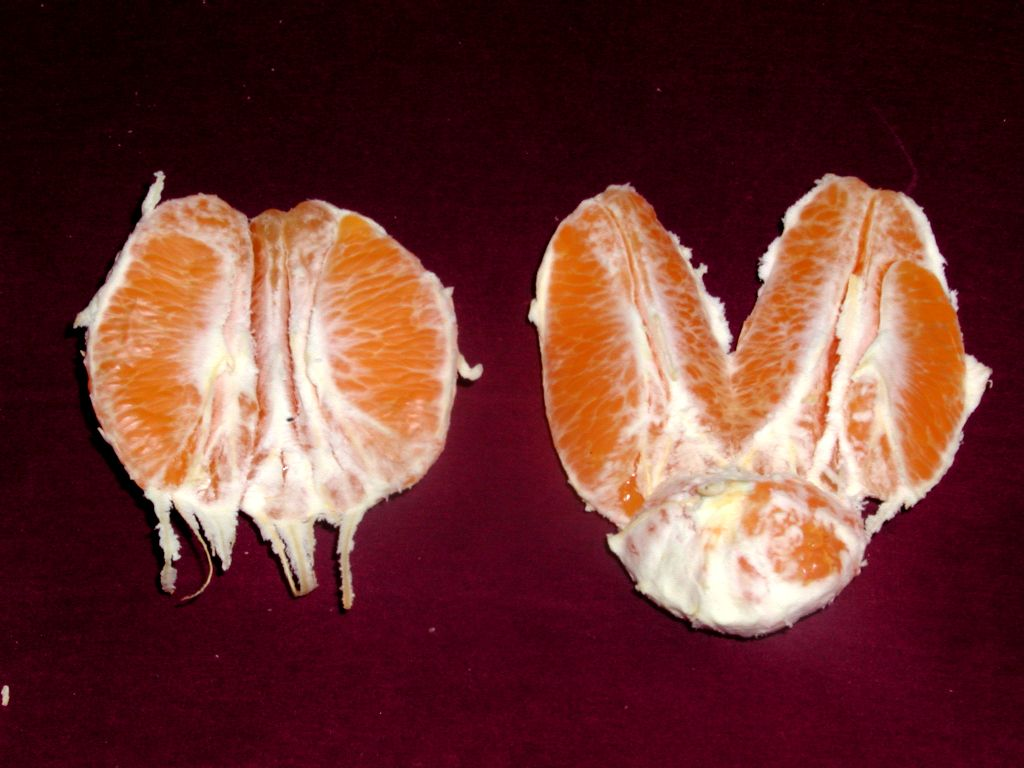
A navel orange, also known as the Washington, Riverside, or Bahia navel.

In 1873 Eliza Tibbets convinced William Saunders, (Note: Saunders was a nurseryman, landscape gardener and horticulturist. Among other things he designed the Soldier's National Cemetery at Gettysburg and the Lincoln Monument in Springfield, Illinois. See biography in 1899, Meehan's Monthly, 9; William Saunders, "Experimental Gardens and Grounds," in USDA, Yearbook of Agriculture 1897, 180 ff; USDA, Yearbook of Agriculture 1900, 625 ff. As the nation's chief experimental horticulturalist, he was responsible for the introduction of many fruits and vegetables to American agriculture; with five others he founded the National Grange and Patrons of Husbandry. See also, US Dept of the Interior, Pioneers of American Landscape Design II (Washington: GPO, 2000) 132–137.) Superintendent of the fledgling Bureau of Agriculture, to make her a test grower for his new seedless oranges from Bahia, Brazil. By planting and nurturing the orange trees that Saunders sent her, Tibbets revolutionized the citrus industry. Introduction of these oranges, later called the Washington Navel Orange, proved to be the most successful experiment of Saunders' tenure, (Note: "His greatest success... was the introduction of the Bahia or Washington Navel Orange... [which] practically revolutionized the orange industry in California at that time...") and one of the outstanding events in the economic and social development of California. (Note: "It is now generally recognized that one of the outstanding events in the economic and social development of California was the introduction of this orange in 1873.") For the next 60 years and more, a great industry was built up from the two small trees planted in Riverside by Eliza Tibbets.

The citrus industry in California had begun before Tibbets' introduction of the Washington navel orange. However, there was no outstanding early and midseason variety of sweet orange generally adapted to the climate. Extant citrus was mostly seedling trees grown from seeds obtained locally or from the Spanish missions. Growers experimented, but there was a lack of standardization in quality. (Note: State Board, 13: "Some of the earlier settlers, with foresight enough to see that there was profit in fruit, secured some of the mission orchards, and under skillful treatment and fostering care these were made productive again by careful pruning, cultivation, and irrigation. These enterprising orchardists reaped a golden reward for their labor.")

Eliza Tibbets planted the two trees in her garden in 1873. (Note: There have been discussion, debate, and even demonstrations regarding this date. For their reviews of the existing evidence, see: Shamel & Pomeroy, Washington Navel Orange, 4–7, ff.; C. S. Pomeroy, "1873 Washington Navel Orange Came to Riverside"; W. A. Taylor, Chief of the Bureau [of Agriculture]. Letter to James Boyd, September 15, 1920. unpublished, available from the USDA Library; U.S. House, Report of the Commissioner of Agriculture for 1884, 48th Cong. 1st Sess. Ex. Doc 178, (Washington: 1884) 7: "Distributed about 12 years ago"; Klotz: The local press of March 28, 1885, printed the following, "Mrs. L. C. Tibbets exhibits a branch from the original orange trees imported from South America to Washington, D.C. and thence to Riverside in 1873.") It is widely accepted that she took care of the two remaining trees using dishwater to keep them alive because the Tibbets lot was not connected to canal water. Agriculture officials attribute the success of the two trees that did flourish to Eliza Tibbets' care. (Note: In 1933 two USDA officials wrote: "The very fact that the trees sent her survived the climatic and other hazards of those pioneer days is in itself remarkable and is probably due to the particular care given them by her." See also: A. D. Shamel, "History of Origin and Introduction of the Washington Navel Orange," The California Citrograph, (April 1933) 171: "These trees survived the climatic and other hazards, largely, I think, through the systematic care of Mrs Tibbets....") The first fruits borne by these trees were produced in the season of 1875–76. When the Washington navel orange was publicly displayed at a fair in 1879, the valuable commercial characteristics of the fruit, including their quality, shape, size, color, texture, and seedlessness, were immediately recognized. Tibbets' orange was also ideally suited to Riverside's semiarid weather, and its thick skin enabled it to be packed and shipped. The contrast between this new fruit and that of seedling trees was so striking that most new grove plantings were of Washington navel oranges. Tibbets sold budwood from her trees to local nurserymen, which led to extensive plantings of nursery trees cloned from hers

=== Legacy of introduction ===
Tibbets' success with the navel orange had led to a rapid increase in citrus planting, and the citrus planted was predominantly the Washington navel orange. The commercial success of these early orchards soon led to a widespread interest in this variety, so that by 1900 it was the most extensively grown citrus fruit in California.

The growth that the Washington Navel Orange (WNO) produced in Riverside spread throughout the state, driving the state and even the national economy. Citrus assumed a major place in California's economy. (Note: The discovery of the fact that citrus fruits could be produced successfully and profitably, gave an impetus to the growth of a most important industry in our State, and especially in the southern counties, which is almost unprecedented in the history of our Union…. to Riverside is due the great impetus that brought the industry into national prominence. State Board, 20: It is also largely to Riverside that the orange industry is indebted for its present importance, from the success attained in the cultivation of the Washington Navel, an orange which achieved widespread fame for itself and the location (Riverside) where it was first successfully grown.) By 1917 WNO culture was a $30 million per year industry in California. By 1933 the WNO industry in CA had grown to an industry with an annual income of $67 million. From one million boxes of oranges in 1887 to more than 65.5 million boxes of oranges, lemons, and grapefruit in 1944, despite the depression years of the 1930s, the California citrus industry experienced nothing short of explosive growth.

The success of Tibbets' orange inspired irrigation projects which converted more desert to orange groves. The size, scale, and ingenuity of the irrigation structures in Riverside and surrounding area are considered one of the agricultural marvels of the age. By 1893 Riverside was the wealthiest city per capita in the United States. Money poured into California. (Note: "From $10.7 million earned in 1900, to $83.2 million in 1920, to $144.6 million in 1930, citrus literally sucked eastern money west.") Tibbets' orange led to an estimated $100 million of direct and indirect investment in citrus industry over the next 25 years. But Eliza Tibbets' orange did not merely feed the wealth and growth of existing towns; new cities and towns popped up whose birth, existence, and future depended upon the condition of the orange market. In 1886 alone new citrus towns were laid out in Rialto, Fontana, Bloomington, Redlands, Terracina, Mound City (Loma Linda), Guasti and South Riverside, (Corona). Irrigated communities like Etiwanda, Redlands, Ontario and many others were launched.

The rapidly expanding citrus industry also stimulated the capital market for real estate. As the industry grew, land which had been regarded as worthless dramatically increased value. Not only did orange culture feed the land boom of the 1880s in Southern California; it allowed Riverside to survive when the land boom collapsed in 1888. (See also: Panic of 1893.) The success of Tibbets' orange stimulated related industries. Citrus built the foundations of the region's economic modernization before the great flood of defense funds began in World War II. (Note: Tobey & Wetherell (1995) analyze "California's history in the half-century between 1890 and 1940 in terms of economic development in the context of the revolution in corporate capitalism" "To explain the region's history we must look beyond the rhetoric of speculative growth to the reality of investment-led growth, using models of economic development. For these we turn to Douglass North's Nobel-Prize-winning explanation of industrial revolution in the United States, and Albert Hirschman's theory of development that informed much of North's analysis. Textiles drove the antebellum North into sustained economic growth. We believe that the citrus industry, with its staple export crop of fresh table fruit, was a similar foundational industry that powered southern California' economy in the fifty years before World War II.) Tibbets' introduction of the Washington navel orange was largely responsible for the fruit packing houses, inventions in boxing machines, fruit wraps and the iced railroad car.

By the mid-1880s, five packing houses sprang up in Riverside. Many methods developed in the course of the growth of this industry, which had a wide application, to other fruit growing industries as well to citrus. The study and efforts of pioneers in the development of the California citrus industry led to the invention of fumigation, of orchard heaters, and of many other methods of culture. In 1897–1898, Benjamin and Harrison Wright invented and patented a mechanized orange washer. By the end of 1898, two-thirds of Riverside's packinghouses were using the machines. At the turn of the century, Stebler and Parker began manufacturing citrus packing machinery in Riverside independent of each other. The companies, which merged in 1922, became the California Iron Works, and later still Food Machinery Corporation (today's FMC Corp.). The Santa Fe Railroad opened a direct line to Riverside in 1886, allowing direct shipment to the east. Eight years later, the first refrigerated rail cars shipped oranges from Riverside to the east on the Santa Fe Railroad.

Another illustration of the results of the success of the citrus industry in California was the organization of the growers into an exchange for the co-operative handling of their crop and its distribution. California Fruit Growers Exchange, a cooperative marketing association made up of local growers, was founded in 1893; it is now known as Sunkist Growers, Incorporated.

A key feature of the growth of the Washington Navel orange industry was a scientific approach to improvement. Study of propagation culture handling, transportation and other phases of producing distributing and marketing the crop was largely responsible for advancements used not only with citrus but also in other fruit industries. In 1893, cyanide gas was used to fight citrus scale. A U. S. Department of Agriculture scientist helped growers to harness nature's biological wrath during the "decay crisis" of 1905–1907, when alarming proportions of fruit spoiled in transit, and wed the industry to the scientific expertise of the USDA.

Growers, scientists, and workers transformed the natural and social landscape of California, turning it into a factory for the production of millions of oranges. Orange growers in California developed the commercialized agriculture that only spread to the rest of the country a generation later. In 1906, University of California established in Riverside its Citrus Experiment Station, the beginnings of the University of California, Riverside. Originally located on the slope of Mount Rubidoux, the station institutionalized the scientific expertise, support, and presence of the state's university and the federal government in the citrus industry, and brought quality control to the first link in the corporate agricultural chain. In a field department was created which provided member growers with scientific and practical horticultural advice and direction that ultimately led to huge gains in productivity.

Tibbets' orange allowed agriculture in California to survive transition from wheat. Wheat had been the single most profitable crop statewide between 1870 and 1900 as California became one of the largest grain producers in the nation. Sometime about 1880, many agriculturalists in the central valley and Southern California began to convert to fruit. Soil and climate were obviously conducive to such a conversion. After the turn of the century, wheat exports began a rapid decline prompted by intense Canadian and Russian competition and declining grain yields due to soil depletion. As the soil became depleted by wheat growing, the large fields were subdivided and used for horticulture. Agriculture thus came to provide a firm foundation for the state's economy.

=== Asian-American history ===
Settlements of Japanese and Korean migrants used to exist along the railroad tracks, which would fill with thousands of workers during the citrus harvest. Many of Riverside's Asian Americans live in the sections of Arlington and La Sierra, the majority being Chinese American and Korean American. The largest Korean American church in the city is Riverside Korean Baptist Church near Arlington.

Riverside's first Chinatown was located in Downtown Riverside, but growing anti-Chinese sentiment and a series of city ordinances, including one that outlawed laundry businesses in the Downtown Mile Square, precipitated the Chinese community's relocation to an area bounded by Brockton and Tequesquite Avenues. The last resident of this Chinatown, George Wong (Wong Ho Leun), died in the 1970s and the remaining buildings were razed. A proposed development spurred archaeological investigations of the Chinatown site in the 1980s. Artifacts that were unearthed during these investigations are housed at the Riverside Metropolitan Museum across from the Mission Inn Hotel. Following the archaeological study, the Chinatown site was placed on the National Register of Historic Places. The site had previously been landmarked as a State Point of Historical Interest, County landmark, and City Landmark. In 2008, the Save Our Chinatown Committee was formed to protect the Chinatown archaeological site from commercial development and increase awareness of Riverside's Chinese American history through public programming.

In 1915 a Japanese immigrant named Jukichi Harada, proprietor for many years of a local restaurant, purchased a home in Riverside in the names of his American-born children in order to provide access for them to the public school system. Neighbors formed a committee and charged him with violating the California Alien Land Law of 1913, which barred aliens ineligible for citizenship from owning land. The case, The People of the State of California v. Jukichi Harada, became a test of the constitutionality of the law and progressed to the state Supreme Court, which ruled that the Harada children could own land. The Metropolitan Museum of Riverside now owns the Harada House, which has been designated a National Historic Landmark.

Dalip Singh Saund, the first Asian-born politician elected to the United States Congress (and the only Sikh-American), was voted into office in 1956 to represent a district that included Riverside.

A substantial community of Indian Americans including Sikhs and Punjabis lived in Riverside with the Inland Empire and the Colorado Desert regions (i.e. Imperial Valley) for nearly a century.

Filipinos (see Filipino American) have been in Riverside for over 100 years. Known as the Pensionados, they were Philippine nationals sent to live in the United States to learn the principles of liberty and self-government.

Since the US annexed the Philippines from 1898 to its independence in 1946, the Filipino community of Riverside and Riverside county are well numerous (i.e. in nearby Moreno Valley).

=== African-American history ===
At the intersection of Howard and 12th sits the last remnants of a formerly thriving African-American neighborhood. The old Wiley Grocery store now houses the activities of "Black" Prince Hall Masons. Nearby is the Church of Our Lady of Guadalupe, a pilgrimage site complete with shrine. Built and destroyed three times, the current incarnation dates from the 1920s. And the Bobby Bonds recreation center named for the major league baseball legend. Extensive information on Riverside's African American Community can be found on the Riversider.Org website.

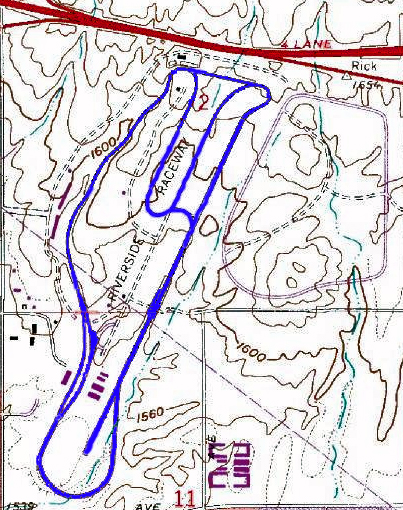
One of Riverside's claims to fame was the Riverside International Raceway. It was open from 1957 to 1989.

=== Sports history ===
Riverside was home to the Riverside International Raceway from September 22, 1957, to July 2, 1989. Races held at the Riverside International Raceway included Cal-Club (SCCA), Formula One, NASCAR, Can-Am, USAC, IMSA, IROC, and CART. The raceway was closed in 1989 to make way for a shopping mall and housing development five years after the raceway property was incorporated with the city of Moreno Valley in 1984. In 2003, plans were announced to build a 3-mile (4.8 km) road course near Merced, California, based on the design of the Riverside layout. The new track would have been known as the Riverside Motorsports Park.

Riverside has had three minor league baseball teams: one in 1941 known as the Riverside Reds, and two from the class-A California League – the Riverside Red Wave from 1988 to 1990, and the Riverside Pilots (a Seattle Mariners Class-A minor league affiliate) from 1993 to 1995. The teams played at the UC-Riverside Sports Center also known as the Blaine Sports Complex. The Red Wave moved to Adelanto in 1990 to become the High Desert Mavericks and the Pilots moved to Lancaster in 1995 to become the Lancaster JetHawks. The Pilot's move occurred after a long-standing dispute between the Pilots, the California League, and the city to build a new facility to replace the Blaine Sports Complex. Today, a semi-pro collegiate team, the Inland Empire Rockets, plays some home games in Riverside and Moreno Valley.

In the early 1940s before the start of World War II, the Riverside Rubes a.k.a. Riverside Reds whom played cross-region rival the San Bernardino Bucs a.k.a. San Bernardino Stars when two major league teams – the Cincinnati Reds and the Pittsburgh Pirates held spring training in the area, followed by the California Winter League and in the 1950s, was the site for the Chicago White Sox and Philadelphia Phillies as well the St. Louis Browns (Baltimore Orioles).

Riverside is the hometown of Bobby Bonds and his son Barry Bonds, and Dusty Baker, current manager of the Houston Astros, and former manager of the San Francisco Giants, Chicago Cubs, and Washington Nationals. Although from Donora, Pennsylvania, Ken Griffey and his son Ken Griffey Jr. have residences in Riverside.

== Timeline ==
=== Spanish period ===
- 1774 On March 20–21 Juan Bautista de Anza treks through the Riverside area from Tubac en route to the San Gabriel Mission intent to find a land route to Alta California.
- 1775 On December 31 – January 1, 1776, de Anza leads a second expedition through the Riverside area intent on establishing a colony in northern California.

=== Transition period: Mexican War of Independence ===
- 1810
  - On September 15, Mexico declares independence from Spain.
  - Dr. James Porter Greves born in upstate New York.
- 1815 John Wesley North born in Sand Lake, NY on January 4.
- 1819 Leandro Serrano establishes Rancho Temescal, the first non-native settlement in what would become Riverside County.

=== Mexican period ===
- 1821 Mexican independence achieved with the signing of the Treaty of Córdoba
- 1838 Juan Bandini receives the Rancho Jurupa land grant.
- 1842
  - Benjamin D. Wilson, future first mayor of Los Angeles, purchases a part of Rancho Jurupa that eventually becomes Rancho Rubidoux.
  - Wilson also arranges for another section of the Rancho Jurupa, the "Bandini Donation", to go to a group of New Mexican colonists who called their settlement Agua Mansa.

=== Transition period: Mexican-American War ===
- 1846 On May 13 the United States declares war on Mexico starting the Mexican–American War.
- 1847 Louis Rubidoux purchases the Rancho Rubidoux from Benjamin Wilson.

=== American period ===
- 1848 On February 2, California became a U.S. holding with the Treaty of Guadalupe Hidalgo, which ended the Mexican–American War.
- 1849 The first California Constitution is adopted.
- 1850
  - California is divided into 27 counties, the area to become Riverside is within Los Angeles County.
  - On September 9, California is admitted into the Union as the 31st state.
- 1853 San Bernardino County is formed, including the area that will become Riverside.
- 1868 Thomas W. Cover purchases parts of the Rancho Rubidoux and Bandini Donations intending to establish a silk colony.
- 1869 John W. North meets Dr. James P. Greves in Knoxville, TN.

National Advisory Board Council tour - welcome to the Riverside District 1966

- 1870
  - Louis Prevost, the silk colony's expert, dies.
  - On March 17 John W. North distributes a leaflet titled "A Colony for California" from Knoxville, TN.
  - On March 25 Dr. Greves distributes a leaflet titled "Ho! For California" from Marshall, MI.
  - In early August, John W. North meets Thomas W. Cover and North visits the Riverside area for the first time.
  - Between September 12 and 20, North, Greves, and others legally incorporate the Southern California Colony Association and purchase land and water rights from the Silk Colony Association.
  - In December Luther C. Tibbets arrives from Washington DC.
- 1873 Eliza Tibbets requests a new variety of orange from the US Department of Agriculture in Washington, DC. She receives 2 surviving Bahia Navel Orange trees.
- 1876 C.C. Miller begins accepting paying guests has his adobe home named the Glenwood Cottages.
- 1880 Frank Miller, C. C. Miller's son, takes over the Glenwood Cottages.
- 1883 The city of Riverside is incorporated.
- 1893 On March 11 the County of Riverside is formed, with Riverside as the county seat.
- 1903
  - The Glenwood Cottages is renamed the Mission Inn.
  - On May 7, President Theodore Roosevelt stays at the Mission Inn.
- 1909 President Taft visits the Mission Inn.
- 1935 On June 15, Frank Miller dies, and the Mission Inn passes to DeWitt and Allis Hutchings.
- 1961 The Mission Inn is designated a California Historical Landmark.
- 1977 In October the Mission Inn is designated a National Historic Landmark.

== Canyon Springs Marketplace (1983–present) ==
Canyon Springs Marketplace
- Location: Riverside, California, United States
- Address: 2660 Canyon Springs Pkwy, 92507
- Opened: 2006; 20 years ago
- Previous names: Canyon Springs Fashion Mall (1989–2004)
- Developer: Edward J. DeBartolo Corporation (1983–1989); The Rouse Company (Rouse-Canyon Springs, Inc.) (1989–2004) and T&S Development, Inc. (1983–2004); TDA Investment Group (2004–2006)
- Manager: Progressive Real Estate Partners
- Owner: TDA Investment Group
- Architect: Leason Pomeroy Associates (Canyon Springs Office Building); Maxwell Starkman Associates; DeRevere, Wise, Garakian & Associates; P.O.D. (Planning Center); Greiner Engineering; Perkowitz+Ruth Architects (Canyon Springs Marketplace)
- Num. of stores: 89
- Floors: 1 (originally planned to be 2)
- Parking: Parking lot
- Website: tdainc.com/canyon-springs-marketplace-a-model-of-retail-resilience-in-riverside/
- Building details

General information
- Type: Mixed-use development (Shopping mall and office building) (1986–2004); Power center (2004–present)
- Construction started: 1987; 39 years ago (Canyon Springs Office Building); 2005; 21 years ago (Canyon Springs Marketplace)

Canyon Springs Marketplace is a strip mall in Riverside, California. Originally, it was a planned super-regional mall called Canyon Springs Mall that was involved The Rouse Company, the Edward J. DeBartolo Corporation and T&S Development, Inc. since 1983, but it was canceled in early 2004.

=== Previous proposals ===
==== DeBartolo plans ====
On April 13, 1986, it was announced that an enclosed 1.3-million-square-foot mall, anchored by six department stores, would be developed via a joint venture of the Youngstown-based Edward J. DeBartolo Corporation, one of the nation's largest shopping center developers, and local dev T&S Development, Inc. The master-planned Canyon Springs development would evolve as a $500-million project covering 400-acres at the junction of the Pomona Freeway and I-215. The first phase would include a business park of 187,000 square feet and an office park featuring a boomerang-shaped, four-story office structure turned to the Pomona Freeway. The building would be designed by Leason Pomeroy Associates, and was the first of three similar structures. An adjacent mall, Canyon Springs Plaza, would be developed near Moreno Valley, California. Construction would be expected to begin early next year on the first building, with two restaurants that would take up to 20,000-square-feet. Following the joint venture agreement, DeBartolo would act as managing partner for the mall and retain a partnership for the north half of the center, while T&S would manage the southern half. However, in July 1989, DeBartolo severed its partnership with T&S. A spokesman for T&S stated that the firm requested that it would terminate its six-year partnership with DeBartolo.

==== Rouse plans ====
In August 1989, the Columbia, Maryland-based Rouse Company had been selected as the new managing partner for the proposed Canyon Springs Mall development. Rouse announced that they would design, develop, lease and operate the mall. Canyon Springs Mall was renamed to Canyon Springs Fashion Mall, and would be a two-level enclosed shopping mall opened in two phases. The Rouse Co. also bought out DeBartolo's interests in the project on July 28, 1989, and the company did not disclose the price publicly. Rouse founded the subsidiary Rouse-Canyon Springs, Inc., which then founded Canyon Springs Mall General Partnership and Canyon Springs Development Limited Partnership. The first phase was announced to contain more than 1 million-square-feet, including three-four anchor stores, and at least 300,000-square-feet of small retail space. Completion was expected by early 1993. The second phase would include an additional 1 million-square-feet with three more department stores and nearly 150,000-square-feet of retail space.

However, throughout the late 80s and early 90s, the project was locked in a legal and economic battle with The Hahn Company, who was developing the competing Galleria at Tyler nearby. This rivalry split the interest of major department store anchors, who were hesitant to commit to both sites, effectively freezing Canyon Springs' progress. Specifically, the department stores Rouse signed a deal with left for the new Galleria at Tyler, and even T&S Development itself. Another blow had come from the 1992 opening of Moreno Valley Mall, developed by the Homart Development Company.

=== Cancelation and sale (2004) ===
In March 2004, following the ending of the T&S partnership and the exodus of anchors, The Rouse Company announced that Canyon Springs Fashion Mall was canceled, and sold the site as Rouse shifted its focus towards open-air centers. The 86-acre site was acquired by Transcan-Riverside for $25.2 million in October 2004 and shifted the development from an enclosed mall to a power center named Canyon Springs Marketplace, part of the Canyon Crossing development. Transcan announced that Canyon Springs Marketplace would be adjacent to other retail stores, including Sam's Club and a Target store. Transcan-Riverside stated that they would begin construction in the summer of 2005 at the development site, described by Kreis as "a unique piece of property," The 86 acres, at the southeast corner of the 215 and 60 freeways, would be part of the 180-acre planning area known as Canyon Springs by the previous developers.

==== Grand opening ====
Canyon Springs Marketplace officially opened to the public in 2006.

=== After opening ===
The marketplace didn't reach 100% occupancy until 2023, when Big Lots opened in early 2021 in the former JoAnn Fabrics space. Nordstrom Rack opened on October 27, 2022, in a space formerly occupied by Bed Bath & Beyond. Sephora opened its new 4,000-square-foot store in June 2023. Urbane Cafe opened in June 2023. Boot Barn opened in late 2023.

== See also ==
- Bibliography of California history
