= List of largest cities in California by population =

This is a list of the 100 largest cities in the U.S. state of California ranked by population, based on estimates for July 1, 2025, by the United States Census Bureau.

Note: The population figures are for the incorporated areas of the listed cities, as opposed to metropolitan areas, urban areas, or counties. Also, the United States Census Bureau and the California Department of Finance use different methods for estimating population, so state estimates will differ from those given here.

2025 rank	City	Population (2025 est.)	County	Image	Description
1	Los Angeles	3,869,089	Los Angeles County		Los Angeles is the largest city in California and one of the largest cities in the Americas. Los Angeles is a global city and famed worldwide as home to the Hollywood film industry and for its influence on popular culture. LA is the largest economic hub on the West Coast and a global center for international trade and finance. Los Angeles is home to world-famous institutions such as UCLA, the Getty Center, and the Oscars, among numerous others.
2	San Diego	1,406,106	San Diego County		San Diego is California's second largest city and its southernmost major city. It is the hub of the San Diego–Tijuana metropolitan area, the largest transborder agglomeration in the Californias. Known as the "birthplace of California", San Diego contains various historical landmarks such as Mission San Diego de Alcalá and Balboa Park. It is home to several universities, including UC San Diego, San Diego State University, and the University of San Diego. The city is also home of the San Diego Zoo and is known as a major military town, including Naval Base San Diego, MCAS Miramar, and Naval Base Coronado, among others.
3	San Jose	989,814	Santa Clara County		San Jose is the most populous city in Northern California, the Bay Area, and Silicon Valley. Major technology companies such as Adobe, Cisco, EBay, PayPal, and Zoom are headquartered in San Jose. The city hosts one of the largest overseas Vietnamese and Hispanic communities in the country. San Jose is home to the Earthquakes of the MLS and Sharks of the NHL. Landmarks include the Winchester Mystery House, Hayes Mansion, the Tech Interactive, and the Children's Discovery Museum.
4	San Francisco	826,079	San Francisco County		San Francisco is the second-largest city in Northern California and the Bay Area, and the second most densely populated major city in the country, after New York City. It is one of the most visited cities in the world, famous for landmarks like the Golden Gate Bridge, the Palace of Fine Arts, and the Transamerica Pyramid. San Francisco is known as a bastion for liberal politics and for its diverse communities like Japantown, the Mission District, and The Castro.
5	Fresno	555,549	Fresno County		Fresno, located in the heart of the San Joaquin Valley, is the most populous city in Central California. Fresno is an important economic hub for one of the most productive agricultural areas in the world, and it is the closest major city and a major gateway to major national parks such as Yosemite National Park, Kings Canyon National Park, and Sequoia National Park. It is also the home of California State University, Fresno.
6	Sacramento	536,449	Sacramento County		Sacramento is the capital of California, and is home to the Government of California. The city grew as an important hub for the California Gold Rush. The city is the center of the Sacramento Valley metropolitan area and the northernmost large city in California. Apart from government, Sacramento is a major home to the healthcare industry and notable institutions like the MLB's Athletics (temporarily), NBA's Sacramento Kings, University of California, Davis (in nearby Davis, CA) and California State University, Sacramento.
7	Long Beach	450,469	Los Angeles County		Long Beach is a coastal city in the Greater Los Angeles area. The Port of Long Beach is one of the largest in the world and Long Beach has some of the most productive oilfields in the state. Long Beach is home to the Aquarium of the Pacific, the RMS Queen Mary docked in Long Beach Harbor. It is a major center of higher education, being home to California State University, Long Beach, the state's largest public university, as well as the headquarters of the California State University System.
8	Oakland	440,838	Alameda County		Oakland is the third-largest city in the Bay Area and one of the largest ports on the West Coast. It is the political, cultural, and economic hub of the East Bay and is regarded as one of the hubs of African-American culture in California. The city is home to notable institutions like the Oakland Museum of California, the Chabot Space and Science Center, the headquarters of Kaiser Permanente and Clorox, among others.
9	Bakersfield	422,165	Kern County		Bakersfield is an important economic, political, and cultural hub for the southern San Joaquin Valley, as home to institutions like the California Living Museum, the Bakersfield Museum of Art, and California State University, Bakersfield. Bakersfield is a major hub of agriculture and energy production in the state, ranking as the most productive county in oil production and the second most productive agriculturally. Bakersfield is the origin of the Bakersfield sound genre of country music and in close proximity to the Sequoia National Forest.
10	Anaheim	341,008	Orange County		Anaheim is the most populous city in Orange County and second-largest in terms of land area. It is known for its growing suburban population and is a major tourist and business destination as the home to Disneyland Resort, Downtown Disney, sports teams (such as the Anaheim Ducks and Los Angeles Angels), and the Anaheim Convention Center.
11	Stockton	324,597	San Joaquin County		Stockton is at the heart of the Sacramento–San Joaquin River Delta and is sometimes considered the boundary between the Sacramento Valley and the San Joaquin Valley. Stockton is the largest agricultural center in Northern California, and its surroundings are home to a large, burgeoning wine industry. With a sea port on the San Joaquin River, it is an important and shipping center and a major logistics hub in the northern part of the state. Stockton is the home of the University of the Pacific.
12	Riverside	323,057	Riverside County		Riverside is the most populous city of southern California's Inland Empire region and the county seat of Riverside County. Riverside is the birthplace of California's citrus industry and is an arts and education hub home to California Baptist University, La Sierra University, and the University of California, Riverside (UCR), as well as the Cheech Marin Center for Chicano Art & Culture. Its downtown is home to historic institutions such as the Mission Inn, one of two historic landmark hotels in California, and the Fox Performing Arts Center, a major early movie theater.
13	Irvine	318,764	Orange County		Irvine is a planned city, mainly developed by the Irvine Company since the 1960s. Irvine is home to the University of California, Irvine (UCI) and other educational institutions. It is one of the fastest growing business hubs in the state, and is home to several corporations, particularly in the technology sector. The city is known for its large amount of urban park space and its growing status as a center for Asian American culture.
14	Santa Ana	315,586	Orange County		Santa Ana is the county seat of Orange County. A major business and government hub, the city is the third-largest in Orange County and the largest regional hub of Mexican American culture. It is also a regional transport hub, being home to John Wayne Airport and several rail lines. The city is home to the famous Bowers Museum, MainPlace Mall, and Discovery Science Center.
15	Chula Vista	275,533	San Diego County		A South Bay suburb of San Diego, Chula Vista is located 7 miles (11 km) north of the Mexican border. It is one of the most economically and culturally diverse cities in southern California. It is home to institutions and attractions such as Southwestern College, the Sesame Place San Diego theme park, and the Living Coast Discovery Center.
16	Santa Clarita	228,430	Los Angeles County		Santa Clarita was incorporated in 1987 as the union of the unincorporated communities of Canyon Country, Newhall, Saugus, and Valencia. One of the earliest examples of a boomburb, the city is home to educational institutions such as California Institute of the Arts, The Master's University and College of the Canyons, and the corporate headquarters of Princess Cruises. Six Flags Magic Mountain lies immediately west of the city.
17	Fremont	226,442	Alameda County		Fremont was created as a single city in 1956, from the unification of several unincorporated communities that had historically been small but grew rapidly in the years after World War II. It is located in the San Francisco Bay Area just north of San Jose in the East Bay. Fremont is home to the Tesla Factory, producing electric cars, and is considered a gateway between Silicon Valley and the East Bay. The city has the largest Asian concentration in the bay, and is an important center of Asian-American economic and political life in Northern California.
18	San Bernardino	222,044	San Bernardino County		San Bernardino is the second-largest city in the Inland Empire metropolitan area of California and the county seat of San Bernardino County, the largest county in geographic area in the 48 contiguous states. San Bernardino is home to California State University, San Bernardino (CSUSB) and a number of corporations in addition to the San Bernardino International Airport. San Bernardino is considered a major center in the state's rapidly growing logistics industry, and is a crucial transportation hub due to its large railyard, access to ports, and its location at the confluence of several major highways. It is the gateway to the San Bernardino Mountains, including its ski resorts and numerous lakes.
19	Fontana	221,223	San Bernardino County		Founded in 1913, Fontana remained rural until a Kaiser Steel mill was built during World War II. The city is now a regional hub of the trucking industry, and home of the California Speedway.
20	Modesto	219,652	Stanislaus County		Modesto is in the center of the Central Valley, east of San Francisco and south of the capital Sacramento. The city is surrounded by fertile farmland and is one of the most agriculturally productive in the state. The city is growing rapidly due to affordable housing in the area and is quickly becoming a bedroom community for commuters to Sacramento, Fresno, and the San Francisco Bay Area.
21	Moreno Valley	214,263	Riverside County		Incorporated in 1984, Moreno Valley lies 65 miles (105 km) east of downtown Los Angeles, just north of Lake Perris. The city is a major military town adjacent to the March Air Reserve Base, and is a regional center for the warehousing and distribution industries as well as a rapidly growing suburban city in the Inland Empire.
22	Oxnard	199,651	Ventura County		Oxnard is one of only a few cities in the state that is the largest in its county, but not the county seat. It is an important agricultural center, with its distinction as the strawberry and lima bean capital of California. Oxnard has a scenic, relatively uncrowded coastline.
23	Huntington Beach	191,451	Orange County		Huntington Beach is an Orange County coastal city best known for its 8.5-mile (13.7 km) beach. It is often referred to as "Surf City" due to its long association with the sport of surfing, and is a major tourist center known for its surfing and nightlife.
24	Glendale	187,160	Los Angeles County		Glendale is the focal point of the Verdugo Mountains subregion and has a large Armenian-American community. Glendale is home to institutions such as DreamWorks Animation, Forest Lawn Memorial Park, and Glendale Community College, as well as two large shopping centers: the Americana at Brand and the Glendale Galleria.
25	Ontario	187,013	San Bernardino County		Ontario is a major city in the Inland Empire area of California, home to the Ontario International Airport and the region's largest shopping mall, Ontario Mills. It is also home to Toyota Arena, the largest indoor arena in the Inland Empire.
26	Elk Grove	185,007	Sacramento County		Elk Grove was a small rural suburb of Sacramento until the housing boom of the 1990s and 2000s, resulting in the city becoming the most populous suburb of the Sacramento region. About 15 miles (24 km) south of downtown Sacramento, Elk Grove has emerged as a popular place for young families to live and commute to the job centers of the area.
27	Santa Rosa	179,437	Sonoma County		Santa Rosa is the largest city in California's Wine Country and the Redwood Empire. The county seat of Sonoma County since 1854, it grew as a center of agriculture, shipping, and industry. It is still an important local center of business and tourism. The city actually suffered the most destruction of the 1906 San Francisco earthquake, which destroyed Santa Rosa's entire downtown. Notable residents have included famed horticulturalist Luther Burbank and Peanuts cartoonist Charles M. Schulz.
28	Rancho Cucamonga	177,856	San Bernardino County		Rancho Cucamonga was incorporated in 1977 as a result of a vote among the residents of the unincorporated communities of Alta Loma, Cucamonga, and Etiwanda. The city was ranked #42 in Money's "Best Places to Live in America 2006". It is home to Chaffey College and the Victoria Gardens shopping and civic center.
29	Oceanside	170,483	San Diego County		The largest city in San Diego's North San Diego County subregion, Oceanside is home to the longest wooden pier on the West Coast and is directly south of Camp Pendleton, the busiest military base in the United States. It is also the home of the Mission San Luis Rey.
30	Garden Grove	170,455	Orange County		Garden Grove is home to the second-largest Vietnamese-American community, as well as Christ Cathedral.
31	Lancaster	170,084	Los Angeles County		Lancaster started as a stop on the Union Pacific Railroad and has grown into the fifth-largest city in Los Angeles County. It began as a small farming community and has since acquired a large and prosperous technology-driven sub-culture. Located in "Aerospace Valley", it is aiming to become the nation's first net-zero city.
32	Roseville	167,302	Placer County		Roseville is a suburb of Sacramento. The city features many parks, bike trails, and other amenities, and in 2006 it was named the healthiest city in America. Roseville is known for its high-end shopping including the Fountains at Roseville and the Westfield Galleria at Roseville (one of the largest malls in northern California).
33	Palmdale	161,845	Los Angeles County		Commonly referred to as the "Aerospace Capital of America", Palmdale is the birthplace of the Space Shuttle, X-15, B-2 Spirit, F-117 Nighthawk, F-35 Lightning II, SR-71 Blackbird, Lockheed L-1011 Tristar, and many other aircraft that have been used in the United States Air Force, NASA, and air forces and airlines around the world. It is the sixth-largest city in Los Angeles County.
34	Corona	161,734	Riverside County		Corona, located in the western part of southern California's Inland Empire, is known as the "Circle City" due to Grand Boulevard's 3-mile (5 km) circular layout. It is the headquarters of companies such as Fender Musical Instruments Corporation, Monster Beverage Corporation, Watson Pharmaceuticals, and West Coast Customs (featured on MTV's Pimp My Ride).
35	Salinas	159,134	Monterey County		Salinas is the most populous city in the Monterey Bay Area, in the northern part of the Central Coast. It is an agricultural center and the hometown of famed writer and Nobel Laureate John Steinbeck.
36	Hayward	157,113	Alameda County		Hayward was an historic salt and agricultural processing center. Sea salt brands produced in Hayward were Oliver Brothers and Leslie Salt. In food processing, Hunt Brothers' Cannery (later Hunt-Wesson Foods) produced canned and bottled tomato products, as well as canned peaches, apricots, and fruit cocktail. Since 1957, it has been the home of California State University, East Bay.
37	Sunnyvale	156,577	Santa Clara County		Located in Silicon Valley, Sunnyvale is home to several large tech company headquarters such as Yahoo! and previously AMD.
38	Pomona	147,807	Los Angeles County		Pomona is located between the Inland Empire and the San Gabriel Valley. The city is home of the Fairplex, which hosts the Los Angeles County Fair, the largest county fair in the United States. It is home to the second-largest polytechnic university in the United States, California State Polytechnic University, Pomona.
39	Visalia	146,541	Tulare County		Visalia is the county seat of Tulare County and the oldest city between Stockton and Los Angeles. It is located at the gateway to Sequoia National Park.
40	Escondido	146,030	San Diego County		Escondido is situated in San Diego's North County region, bordering the cities of San Diego and San Marcos. The city is home to Dixon Lake, Stone Brewing Co., the North County Mall, and the Queen Califia's Magical Circle sculpture garden.
41	Victorville	141,395	San Bernardino County		Victorville is located in the Victor Valley, at the southwestern edge of the Mojave Desert. It is the site of the Southern California Logistics Airport, formerly George Air Force Base before it was converted to civilian use.
42	Fullerton	138,675	Orange County		Historically, Fullerton was a center of agriculture, petroleum extraction, transportation, and manufacturing. It is home to several educational institutions, notably the California State University, Fullerton and Fullerton College. It is also home to St. Jude Medical Center.
43	Torrance	138,391	Los Angeles County		Torrance is situated 11 miles (18 km) south of Los Angeles International Airport (LAX), 8 miles (13 km) north of the Port of Los Angeles, 30 miles (48 km) west of Disneyland, and bounded by the Pacific Ocean on the west with 1.5 miles (2.4 km) of beach. Incorporated in 1921, it is the eighth-largest city in Los Angeles County.
44	Orange	138,365	Orange County		Unusual for cities in Orange County, Orange preserved many of its homes that were built prior to the 1960s, now located in the city's Old Towne District. Orange is the home of Chapman University, Santiago Canyon College, Children's Hospital of Orange County, and The Outlets at Orange.
45	Pasadena	135,804	Los Angeles County		Pasadena is famous for hosting the annual Tournament of Roses Parade and the Rose Bowl football game. The city is home to many scientific and cultural institutions such as NASA's Jet Propulsion Laboratory, the Art Center College of Design, and the California Institute of Technology.
46	Santa Clara	133,446	Santa Clara County		Santa Clara is located in the center of Silicon Valley and is home to the headquarters of Intel, AMD, Applied Materials, Sun Microsystems, NVIDIA, Agilent Technologies, and many other high-tech companies. It also is home to one of the largest theme parks in northern California, California's Great America, and to Levi's Stadium, a football stadium that currently serves as the home of the National Football League's San Francisco 49ers.
47	Clovis	129,347	Fresno County		Clovis is the second-largest city in Fresno County. Lying at the foot of the Sierra Nevada mountain range, which includes Yosemite, Kings Canyon, and Sequoia national parks, Clovis has been known as the "Gateway to the Sierras".
48	Simi Valley	124,861	Ventura County		Simi Valley is a bedroom community located in a valley of the same name. It is the site of the Ronald Reagan Presidential Library. The city is also home to the Brandeis-Bardin Institute, and various parks and hiking trails are located in the Simi Hills nearby.
49	Vallejo	123,287	Solano County		Vallejo was home of the Mare Island Naval Shipyard, one of the most important naval shipyards in the country, from the 1850s until its closure in the 1990s. It was very briefly the capital of California in 1852. It is the largest city in Solano County, and the home of Six Flags Discovery Kingdom.
50	Concord	123,261	Contra Costa County		Concord is a major regional suburban East Bay center within the San Francisco Bay Area. The former Concord Naval Weapons Station was located to the north of the city.
51	Fairfield	122,489	Solano County		Fairfield is the county seat of Solano County, but not the largest city in the county, which is Vallejo. It is the home of Travis Air Force Base and the Jelly Belly jelly bean factory.
52	Thousand Oaks	122,230	Ventura County		Thousand Oaks is the largest city in the Conejo Valley and an important economic hub for Ventura County. The city was built as a master-planned community with a balance of housing, shopping, businesses, and higher education, all surrounded by thousands of acres of open space. It is home to California Lutheran University. Thousand Oaks has consistently ranked as one of the safest cities in America.
53	Berkeley	121,911	Alameda County		Noted as one of the most politically liberal cities in the nation, Berkeley is home to the University of California, Berkeley, the oldest campus of the University of California system.
54	Antioch	118,958	Contra Costa County		Located along the Sacramento–San Joaquin River Delta and known as "The Gateway to the Delta", Antioch is a suburb of San Francisco, Oakland, and the rest of the San Francisco Bay Area. The city experienced rapid growth in the last 30 years as real estate prices have pushed families toward the outskirts of the Bay Area. Due to its location, it can also be seen as a suburb of the Sacramento Metropolitan Area.
55	Menifee	118,592	Riverside County		Menifee, a fast-growing city located in southwestern Riverside County, incorporated in 2008. Mostly residential in character, it is home to the Sun City retirement community and also encompasses the communities of Quail Valley, Paloma Valley, and portions of Romoland.
56	Temecula	114,865	Riverside County		Forming the southwestern anchor of the Inland Empire region, Temecula is home to the Pechanga Resort & Casino and the Temecula Valley wine region, featuring nearly 50 wineries.
57	Richmond	114,861	Contra Costa County		Richmond is located in western Contra Costa County along the eastern shores of San Francisco Bay. It has been called a company town based on its relationship with the Chevron Corporation, and it is the site of the Chevron Richmond Refinery.
58	Murrieta	114,124	Riverside County		Murrieta is largely a bedroom community, with many of its residents commuting to jobs in the neighboring city of Temecula as well as San Diego, Orange, and Los Angeles counties. The city lies just beneath the Santa Rosa Plateau.
59	Carlsbad	112,260	San Diego County		Carlsbad is an affluent, coastal resort city in the North San Diego County region. The city is mainly known for shopping, tourism, a booming high-tech industry, and resort living. It is home to the McClellan-Palomar Airport, the Gemological Institute of America, and the Legoland California theme park.
60	Santa Maria	111,390	Santa Barbara County		Santa Maria, the largest city in Santa Barbara County, is in the heart of the Santa Maria Valley wine region and is known for its Santa Maria-style barbecue. Notable landmarks in the city include the Santa Maria Public Airport and Allan Hancock College.
61	Ventura	109,914	Ventura County		Ventura, officially the City of San Buenaventura, is the county seat of Ventura County. The city is home to the Mission San Buenaventura, Ventura College, and the Patagonia headquarters. Ventura Harbor is home to the headquarters of Channel Islands National Park, and boats to the Channel Islands depart from there daily.
62	Costa Mesa	108,881	Orange County		Since its incorporation in 1953, Costa Mesa has grown from a semi-rural farming community to a primarily suburban city with an economy based on retail, commerce, and light manufacturing. Costa Mesa is home to South Coast Plaza, one of the largest shopping malls in the United States, as well as the Segerstrom Center for the Arts.
63	Downey	108,468	Los Angeles County		Located southeast of downtown Los Angeles, Downey is the birthplace of the Apollo space program and the site of the oldest surviving McDonald's restaurant.
64	Jurupa Valley	107,311	Riverside County		Jurupa Valley was incorporated July 1, 2011, formed from several unincorporated communities including Mira Loma, Glen Avon, Pedley, Rubidoux, and Sunnyslope. The city is home to the Jensen Alvarado Ranch historic park and museum.
65	Rialto	106,554	San Bernardino County		Rialto is home to three major regional distribution centers: Staples, Inc., which serves stores across the entire West Coast of the United States, FedEx, and Target.
66	West Covina	105,301	Los Angeles County		West Covina is a mostly middle-class suburb located east of downtown Los Angeles in the eastern San Gabriel Valley.
67	Chico	105,081	Butte County		Chico is the largest city north of Sacramento and the retail hub of the mid-Sacramento Valley. It is home to California State University Chico, Bidwell Park, and Sierra Nevada Brewing Company.
68	El Monte	105,075	Los Angeles County		El Monte lies in the San Gabriel Valley region and was formerly a crossroad along the Old Spanish Trail. It is home to Penske Motor Group, one of the largest car dealerships in the world.
69	Vacaville	103,850	Solano County		Vacaville is located nearly halfway between Sacramento and San Francisco. It is home to several biotechnology/pharmaceutical facilities.
70	San Mateo	103,337	San Mateo County		San Mateo is located about 20 miles south of San Francisco. San Mateo has one of the better-developed suburban downtowns in the San Francisco Bay Area, home to over 800 shops and restaurants. The economy of San Mateo consists of jobs in the tech, healthcare, financial, government, and retail fields. Companies based in San Mateo include Sony Interactive Entertainment, Franklin Templeton Investments, Fisher Investments, Solstice, Guidewire Software, Coupa, Snowflake Inc., Roblox Corporation, Marketo, SurveyMonkey, Devsisters USA, and GoPro.
71	Burbank	102,988	Los Angeles County		Burbank is nicknamed the "Media Capital of the World" for being the home of many media and entertainment production companies, including Warner Bros. Entertainment, Warner Music Group, NBC Universal, The Walt Disney Company, ABC, Cartoon Network Studios, and Nickelodeon.
72	Hesperia	102,605	San Bernardino County		Hesperia is a semi-rural suburban community located in the High Desert region of the Mojave Desert, 25 miles (40 km) north of San Bernardino.
73	Tracy	101,901	San Joaquin County		Tracy is the second most populated city in San Joaquin County. The city has experienced rapid growth since the 1980s, becoming an exurb of the San Francisco Bay Area.
74	El Cajon	101,755	San Diego County		El Cajon is located east of San Diego. Nestled in a valley surrounded by mountains, the city has acquired the nickname of "The Big Box". The city is home to Grossmont College and Gillespie Field.
75	Inglewood	101,662	Los Angeles County		Located southwest of downtown Los Angeles, Inglewood is home to the world-famous The Forum arena, landmark Randy's Donuts, and SoFi Stadium, home of the National Football League's Los Angeles Rams and Los Angeles Chargers.
76	Daly City	101,261	San Mateo County		San Francisco's southern neighbor, Daly City houses the famous Cow Palace (which is often believed to be in San Francisco), as well as the largest Filipino population outside of the Philippines.
77	Merced	99,724	Merced County		Merced, known as the "Gateway to Yosemite", is located in Central California. The University of California, Merced campus is located northeast of the city.
78	Vista	98,274	San Diego County		Vista is located just 7 miles (11 km) inland from the Pacific Ocean in northern San Diego County. The city has more than 25 educational institutions, and a business park home to over 800 companies.
79	Norwalk	97,104	Los Angeles County		Norwalk is a Gateway City located southeast of downtown Los Angeles. Norwalk is the home of Cerritos College and the Los Angeles County Registrar/Recorder.
80	Chino	96,957	San Bernardino County		Chino and its surroundings have long been a center of agriculture and dairy farming, serving the considerable demands for milk products in southern California and much of the southwestern United States. Prado Regional Park is located in the southern portion of the city.
81	Manteca	96,693	San Joaquin County		Manteca (Spanish for "lard") is a fast-growing city located about 12 miles south of Stockton and 17 miles northwest of Modesto. Built along the State Route 120 freeway, between Interstate 5 and State Route 99, the city has experienced rapid growth since the 1980s as a result of families and commuters moving out of the Bay Area located 30 miles to the west.
82	Folsom	95,680	Sacramento County		Located about 25 miles (40 km) east of Sacramento, Folsom features a historic downtown and is home to landmarks such as Folsom State Prison and Folsom Lake.
83	San Marcos	94,908	San Diego County		San Marcos is a North County suburb of San Diego and home of the two-year Palomar College and the four-year California State University, San Marcos. The Lake San Marcos resort community is surrounded by the city of San Marcos.
84	Indio	94,269	Riverside County		Indio is located in the Coachella Valley region of the Sonoran Desert, 23 miles (37 km) east of Palm Springs and 128 miles (206 km) east of Los Angeles. Indio and its surrounding communities are regarded as a major agricultural center for southern California and is the home of the Coachella and Stagecoach music festivals.
85	Redding	94,092	Shasta County		Located on the banks of the Sacramento River, Redding is the second-largest city in California north of Sacramento. It is the gateway to numerous recreation areas including Shasta Lake, the Trinity Alps, and Mount Shasta. It is also home to the Sundial Bridge at Turtle Bay, the world's largest sundial.
86	Hemet	93,649	Riverside County		Hemet, in the San Jacinto Valley, is the home of the Ramona Pageant, one of the longest running outdoor plays in the United States. Hemet is also the home of the Western Science Center, the Hemet-Ryan Airport, and the Diamond Valley Reservoir.
87	Carson	90,808	Los Angeles County		Carson is a suburb in the South Bay region of Greater Los Angeles. It is home of California State University, Dominguez Hills, and the Dignity Health Sports Park sports complex, the home stadium of the LA Galaxy.
88	Compton	90,500	Los Angeles County		An inner suburb of Los Angeles, Compton is known for its large African American and Latino communities. The city is home to Richland Farms, one of the last urban farming communities in the Los Angeles metro area, and is also almost universally considered to be the birthplace of gangsta rap.
89	Mission Viejo	90,484	Orange County		Located in southern Orange County in the Saddleback Valley, Mission Viejo is considered one of the largest master-planned communities ever built under a single project in the United States. The city is home to Saddleback College, Providence Mission Hospital, and a regional shopping mall known as The Shops at Mission Viejo.
90	Santa Monica	90,082	Los Angeles County		Santa Monica, a famed beachfront city surrounded on three sides by Los Angeles, is home to a mixture of affluent, single-family neighborhoods, renters, surfers, young professionals, and students. It is the site of the world-famous Santa Monica Pier and the headquarters of several companies such as Universal Music Group, Activision Blizzard, and the RAND Corporation.
91	South Gate	90,071	Los Angeles County		Located southeast of downtown Los Angeles, South Gate is part of the Gateway Cities region of Los Angeles County. In 1990, South Gate was one of ten U.S. communities to receive the All-America City Award from the National Civic League.
92	Westminster	88,966	Orange County		Westminster is known for its Vietnamese American community, one of the largest in the United States.
93	Rancho Cordova	87,554	Sacramento County		Located south of the American River, Rancho Cordova is a fast-growing suburb of the greater Sacramento area and is home to major employers in the government and aerospace industries, as well as points of interest such as the Sacramento Children's Museum.
94	Santa Barbara	86,422	Santa Barbara County		Santa Barbara is a popular tourist and resort coastal city, known for its Spanish style architecture, coastal weather, mountain backdrops, and numerous sandy beaches. The University of California, Santa Barbara campus sits west of the city, adjacent to Isla Vista and the Pacific Ocean.
95	Citrus Heights	86,348	Sacramento County		Citrus Heights is a suburb located northeast of Sacramento. It is home to the Sunrise Mall.
96	Lake Forest	86,333	Orange County		Lake Forest, in inland Orange County, is primarily suburban in character. The planned community of Foothill Ranch is located in Lake Forest. The city lies in close proximity to Whiting Ranch Wilderness Park and Limestone Canyon Regional Park.
97	San Ramon	86,209	Contra Costa County		San Ramon is a city located in the San Ramon Valley, 34 miles (55 km) east of San Francisco. It is home to several company headquarters such as Chevron, The Cooper Companies, 24 Hour Fitness, the West Coast headquarters of AT&T, and GE Digital.
98	Whittier	85,815	Los Angeles County		Whittier is part of the Gateway Cities of Los Angeles County and is home to Whittier College.
99	Mountain View	85,438	Santa Clara County		Located in the Silicon Valley technology hub, Mountain View serves as the headquarters for companies such as Google, Alphabet Inc., and Intuit and was the home of the Shockley Semiconductor Laboratory.
100	San Leandro	85,353	Alameda County		Historically a town with dozens of huge cherry farms and a Spanish missionary ranch, San Leandro today is a rapidly growing city of worldwide industries and a suburb of Oakland.

== Map ==
Cities in California with more than 200,000 residents.

== See also ==
- List of cities and towns in California
- List of cities and towns in the San Francisco Bay Area
- List of California urban areas
- List of United States cities by population
- List of largest U.S. municipalities by race/ethnicity in 2020
