= Crestmore Heights, California =

Crestmore Heights
- Neighborhood of Jurupa Valley; Former census-designated place
- Position in California
- Coordinates: 34°01′48″N 117°23′45″W
- Country: United States
- State: California
- County: Riverside

Area
  - Total: 0.288 sq mi (0.745 km^{2})
  - Land: 0.288 sq mi (0.745 km^{2})
  - Water: 0 sq mi (0 km^{2}) 0%
- Elevation: 1,033 ft (315 m)

Population (2010)
  - Total: 384
  - Density: 1,330/sq mi (515/km^{2})
- Time zone: UTC-8 (Pacific (PST))
  - Summer (DST): UTC-7 (PDT)
- GNIS feature ID: 2629130

Crestmore Heights is a former census-designated place in Riverside County, California, now part of the city of Jurupa Valley, California. Crestmore Heights sits at an elevation of 1,033 feet (315 m). The 2010 United States census reported Crestmore Heights's population was 384.

== Geography ==
The community is located on the south side of Fontana, north of downtown Riverside, California, and west of the Santa Ana River.

According to the United States Census Bureau, the CDP covers an area of 0.3 square miles (0.7 km^{2}), all of it land.

=== Crestmore Quarry ===
The former and large Crestmore Quarry is on the east side of the hill. The Riverside Portland Cement Company had its plant here, and used both the limestone and the underlying granodiorite for its manufacture of cement. Mineral specimens were also collected from the mine.

As of March 2015, the mining operation of the former TXI cement manufacturing facility had stopped. As the shut down of the operations of this historic facility progressed, the quality of the environment appeared to have increased.

== Demographics ==
Historical population
| Census | Pop. | Note | %± |
|---|---|---|---|
| 2010 | 384 | | — |
U.S. Decennial Census; 1850–1870 1880-1890; 1900 1910 1920; 1930 1940 1950; 1960 1970 1980; 1990 2000 2010

Crestmore Heights first appeared as a census designated place in the 2010 U.S. census. In 2011, Crestmore Heights was one of nine communities (Belltown, Crestmore Heights CDP, Glen Avon CDP, Indian Hills, Jurupa Hills, Pedley CDP, Rubidoux CDP, Sunnyslope CDP, and Mira Loma CDP) that merged to form the city of Jurupa Valley.

=== 2010 census ===
Crestmore Heights CDP, California – Racial and ethnic composition Note: the US Census treats Hispanic/Latino as an ethnic category. This table excludes Latinos from the racial categories and assigns them to a separate category. Hispanics/Latinos may be of any race.
| Race / Ethnicity (NH = Non-Hispanic) | Pop 2010 | % 2010 |
|---|---|---|
| White alone (NH) | 111 | 28.91% |
| Black or African American alone (NH) | 2 | 0.52% |
| Native American or Alaska Native alone (NH) | 0 | 0.00% |
| Asian alone (NH) | 6 | 1.56% |
| Native Hawaiian or Pacific Islander alone (NH) | 0 | 0.00% |
| Other race alone (NH) | 0 | 0.00% |
| Mixed race or Multiracial (NH) | 2 | 0.52% |
| Hispanic or Latino (any race) | 263 | 68.49% |
| Total | 384 | 100.00% |

The 2010 United States census reported that Crestmore Heights had a population of 384. The population density was 1,335.1 inhabitants per square mile (515.5/km^{2}). The racial makeup of Crestmore Heights was 229 (59.6%) White (28.9% Non-Hispanic White), 2 (0.5%) African American, 2 (0.5%) Native American, 6 (1.6%) Asian, 0 (0%) Pacific Islander, 133 (35%) from other races, and 12 (3.1%) from two or more races. Hispanic or Latino of any race were 263 persons (68.5%).

The census reported that 384 people (100% of the population) lived in households, 0 (0%) lived in non-institutionalized group quarters, and 0 (0%) were institutionalized.

There were 112 households, out of which 41 (37%) had children under the age of 18 living in them, 54 (48%) were opposite-sex married couples living together, 14 (13%) had a female householder with no husband present, 11 (10%) had a male householder with no wife present. There were 9 (8%) unmarried opposite-sex partnerships, and 3 (3%) same-sex married couples or partnerships. 21 households (19%) were made up of individuals, and 8 (7%) had someone living alone who was 65 years of age or older. The average household size was 3.43. There were 79 families (71% of all households); the average family size was 4.03.

The population was spread out, with 99 people (26%) under the age of 18, 62 people (16%) aged 18 to 24, 77 people (20%) aged 25 to 44, 109 people (28%) aged 45 to 64, and 37 people (10%) who were 65 years of age or older. The median age was 33.7 years. For every 100 females, there were 107.6 males. For every 100 females age 18 and over, there were 108.0 males.

There were 123 housing units at an average density of 427.6 per square mile (165.1/km^{2}), of which 79 (71%) were owner-occupied, and 33 (30%) were occupied by renters. The homeowner vacancy rate was 2%; the rental vacancy rate was 11%. 276 people (72% of the population) lived in owner-occupied housing units and 108 people (28%) lived in rental housing units.

== Government ==
In the California State Legislature, Crestmore Heights is in the 31st senatorial district, represented by Democrat Sabrina Cervantes, and in the 58th Assembly district, represented by Republican Leticia Castillo.

In the United States House of Representatives, Crestmore Heights is in California's 39th congressional district, represented by Democrat Mark Takano. California is represented in the United States Senate by Democrats Alex Padilla and Adam Schiff.
