= Eastvale, California =

City in California, United States

- City
- City of Eastvale
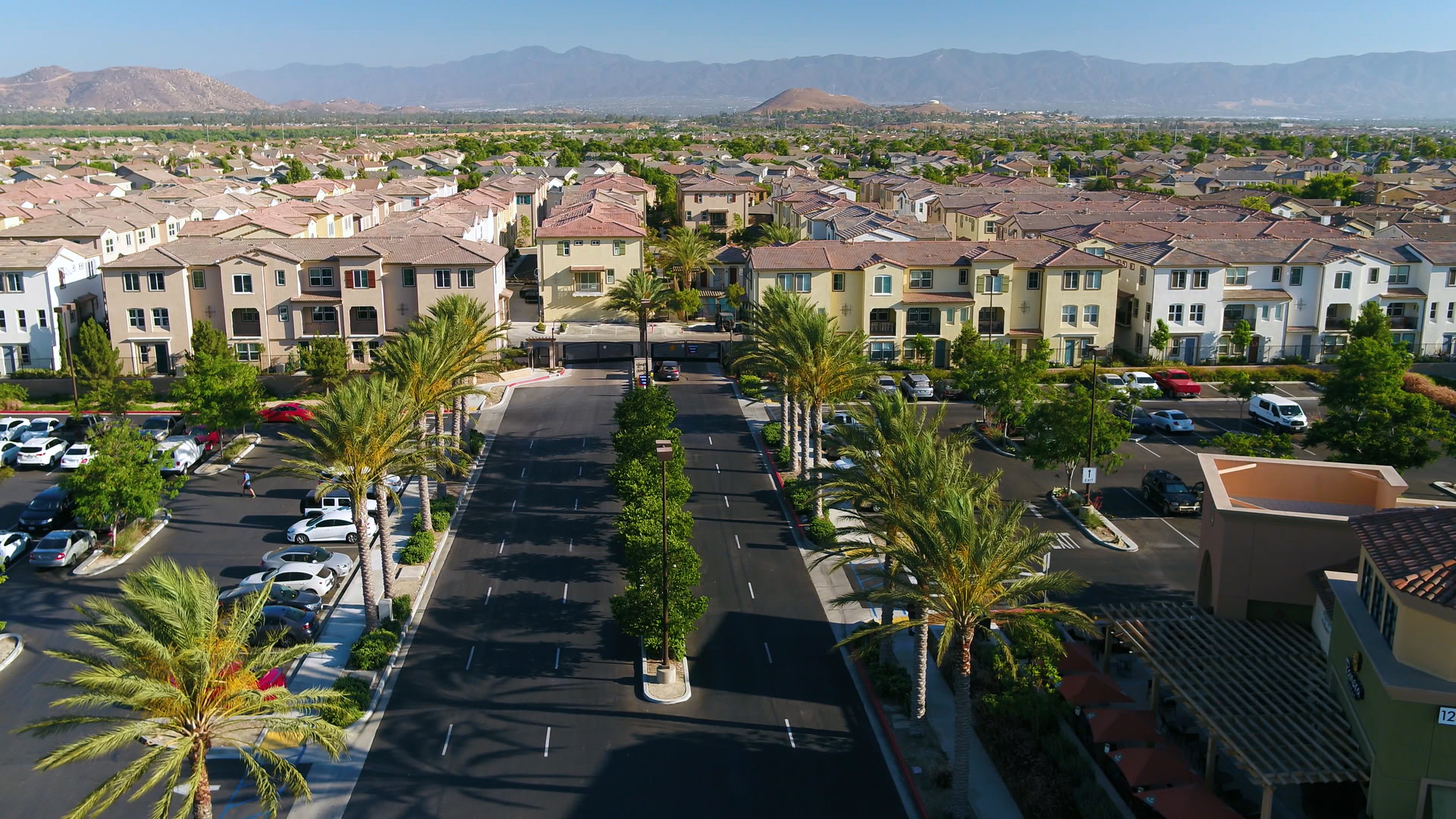
- Eastvale, with Beacon Hill in the background

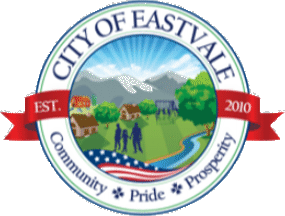
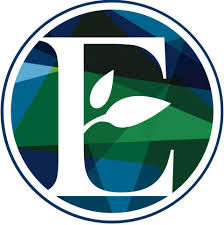
- Seal Logo
- Motto: "Community, Pride, Prosperity"
- Interactive map of Eastvale, California
- Location in the United States
- Coordinates: 33°57′49″N 117°33′51″W
- Country: United States
- State: California
- County: Riverside
- Incorporated: October 1, 2010

Government
  - Type: Council-Manager
  - Mayor: Christian Dinco
  - Mayor Pro Tem: Michael McMinn
  - City council: Christian Dinco, Michael McMinn, Clint Lorimore, Todd Rigby, Jocelyn Yow
  - City Manager: Mark Orme

Area
  - Total: 13.12 sq mi (33.97 km^{2})
  - Land: 12.67 sq mi (32.82 km^{2})
  - Water: 0.44 sq mi (1.14 km^{2}) 0.35%
- Elevation: 627 ft (191 m)

Population (2020)
  - Total: 69,757
  - Density: 5,062.4/sq mi (1,954.59/km^{2})
- Time zone: UTC-8 (PST)
  - Summer (DST): UTC-7 (PDT)
- ZIP codes: 91752, 92880
- Area codes: 909, 951
- FIPS code: 06-21230
- GNIS feature IDs: 2629135, 2650583, 2650584
- Website: www.eastvaleca.gov

Eastvale is a city in northwestern Riverside County, California, in the Inland Empire region of Southern California. The area transitioned from a dairy farm enclave to a developed community starting in the 1990s and was incorporated on October 1, 2010. As of the 2020 census, the city had a population of 69,757. The city's name is derived from "East Vale" as a listed school district in 1893 by the Riverside County Board of Commissioners.

City boundaries extend from Hellman Avenue to the west (the San Bernardino County line), State Route 60 to the north (also the San Bernardino County line), the Santa Ana River and Norco to the south, and Interstate 15 to the east. It is surrounded by the cities of Chino, Ontario, Jurupa Valley, Norco, and Corona.

The city is served by the Corona Norco Unified School District. According to the 2020 United States Census, Eastvale has a median household income at one of the top earning percentiles in the country at $151,615.

== History ==
Recorded history of land in the far western side of present-day Riverside County and north of the Santa Ana River begins in 1838, when Mexican Governor Juan Alvarado, of the Alta California territory, granted Rancho Jurupa (some 48 square miles) to Juan Bandini. The city of Eastvale now occupies approximately the westernmost one-quarter of former Rancho Jurupa land grant. The Mexican–American War between the United States and Mexico ended in 1848 with the Treaty of Guadalupe Hidalgo, by which Mexico ceded Alta California and much other Southwestern land to the US. Two years later, on September 9, 1850, California became a U.S. state.

For 65 years, between 1889 and 1954, the Fuller family owned about 6 square miles of ranch land on the north side of the Santa Ana River. Almost half of present-day Eastvale, between Schleisman Road and the river, was included within the Fuller ranch's boundaries.

Eastvale, often spelled with two words as "East Vale" in early days, was an elementary school district in Riverside County for more than 50 years, from County formation in 1893 until 1947 when the district was merged with Corona and Norco schools.

=== Recent history ===
Once a rural area, Eastvale was predominantly dairy farms and agricultural until the late 1990s. At that time, the area started to suburbanize to accommodate the influx of people coming from Orange and Los Angeles counties seeking more affordable housing.

=== Incorporation effort ===
Eastvale was one of several unincorporated areas of Riverside County that had strong community support for city incorporation. The passage of AB 1602 in the mid-2000s, a state bill that adds funds from vehicle license fees, made it easier for unincorporated areas to attain cityhood. In 2008, the communities of Menifee, Sun City and Quail Valley merged and incorporated as the City of Menifee. The law also brought renewed interest in incorporation efforts for Mira Loma and Jurupa Valley (Mira Loma, Pedley, Glen Avon, Sunnyslope, and Rubidoux).

The community of Eastvale actively attempted to incorporate from the mid-2000s through 2010. The incorporation effort was being led by the Eastvale Incorporation Committee. Other groups were also proponents of Eastvale cityhood, such as the Yes on Eastvale Cityhood Committee.

The Eastvale Incorporation Committee successfully gathered enough signatures to qualify on the June 8, 2010. "Measure A" was placed on the ballot deciding incorporation. "Measure B" would decide how the city council would be elected: at large, by district, or from district. Measure A passed with 65.8% of voters approving incorporation. Eastvale officially incorporated on October 1, 2010. Voters also decided that the city council would be elected at large. Eastvale's first city council members were Ike Bootsma, Jeff DeGrandpre, Kelly Howell, Adam Rush, and Ric Welch. The council selected Adam Rush as Eastvale's first mayor.

== Geography ==
The Los Angeles County line is approximately 8 miles northwest of Eastvale, and the Orange County line is approximately 5 miles to the southwest. The proximity of these two heavily commercialized counties, and the fact that Eastvale is roughly squared between Interstate 15 and State Routes 91, 60, and 71, has made Eastvale popular for those who commute to these counties for employment, making Eastvale a commuter town.

According to the Eastvale area plan, Eastvale has a total area of 13.1 square miles (34 km^{2}), of which 12.5 square miles (32 km^{2}) is land and 0.6 square miles (1.6 km^{2}), or 4.76%, is water.

According to the United States Census Bureau, the former census-designated place of Eastvale covered an area of 11.4 square miles (30 km^{2}), 99.65% of it land, and 0.35% of it water.

Eastvale has two postal ZIP codes, 92880 and 91752, which often use mailing addresses of Corona and Mira Loma, respectively.

Most of Eastvale, like most of western Riverside County, has the telephone area code of 951. However, according to the California Public Utilities Commission, because the 951 area code was split along telephone service areas and not strictly along county boundaries, some Eastvale residents still retain the older 909 area code.

== Climate ==
Eastvale experiences a warm Mediterranean climate (Köppen climate classification CSa) and has mild winters and hot summers. Most of the rainfall (as in all of Southern California) occurs during winter and early spring. The winter low temperatures can get cold enough for frost. Winter days are pleasant, with the mercury staying around 65 degrees Fahrenheit (occasionally warming into the 70s). Summertime is hot, with highs averaging in the low 90s. During the hottest months, daytime temperatures in Eastvale often exceed 100 degrees.

Climate data for Eastvale, California
Month	Jan	Feb	Mar	Apr	May	Jun	Jul	Aug	Sep	Oct	Nov	Dec	Year
Record high °F (°C)	94 (34)	95 (35)	101 (38)	102 (39)	108 (42)	110 (43)	111 (44)	112 (44)	115 (46)	109 (43)	99 (37)	94 (34)	115 (46)
Mean daily maximum °F (°C)	68 (20)	70 (21)	71 (22)	78 (26)	80 (27)	88 (31)	92 (33)	94 (34)	91 (33)	83 (28)	74 (23)	68 (20)	80 (27)
Mean daily minimum °F (°C)	42 (6)	43 (6)	45 (7)	48 (9)	52 (11)	57 (14)	61 (16)	62 (17)	60 (16)	52 (11)	45 (7)	40 (4)	51 (10)
Record low °F (°C)	23 (−5)	26 (−3)	28 (−2)	30 (−1)	32 (0)	42 (6)	47 (8)	43 (6)	41 (5)	29 (−2)	26 (−3)	22 (−6)	22 (−6)
Average precipitation inches (mm)	3.16 (80)	3.42 (87)	2.63 (67)	.76 (19)	.19 (4.8)	.04 (1.0)	.04 (1.0)	.11 (2.8)	.25 (6.4)	.39 (9.9)	1.42 (36)	2.24 (57)	14.65 (372)

== Demographics ==
Historical population
Census	Pop.	Note	%±
2010	53,668		—
2020	69,757		30.0%
U.S. Decennial Census; 1850–1870 1880-1890; 1900 1910 1920; 1930 1940 1950; 1960 1970 1980; 1990 2000 2010 2020

Eastvale first appeared as a census designated place in the 2010 U.S. census; and as a city in the 2020 U.S. census.

=== Racial and ethnic composition ===
Eastvale city, California – Racial and ethnic composition Note: the US Census treats Hispanic/Latino as an ethnic category. This table excludes Latinos from the racial categories and assigns them to a separate category. Hispanics/Latinos may be of any race.
Race / Ethnicity (NH = Non-Hispanic)	Pop 2010	Pop 2020	% 2010	% 2020
White alone (NH)	12,712	13,603	23.69%	19.50%
Black or African American alone (NH)	4,914	6,061	9.16%	8.69%
Native American or Alaska Native alone (NH)	102	117	0.19%	0.17%
Asian alone (NH)	12,770	20,654	23.79%	29.61%
Native Hawaiian or Pacific Islander alone (NH)	156	185	0.29%	0.27%
Other race alone (NH)	110	377	0.20%	0.54%
Mixed race or Multiracial (NH)	1,459	2,596	2.72%	3.72%
Hispanic or Latino (any race)	21,445	26,164	39.96%	37.51%
Total	53,668	69,757	100.00%	100.00%

=== 2020 census ===
As of the 2020 census, Eastvale had a population of 69,757. The population density was 5,504.4 inhabitants per square mile (2,125.3/km^{2}).

The age distribution was 29.0% under the age of 18, 9.6% aged 18 to 24, 27.3% aged 25 to 44, 25.3% aged 45 to 64, and 8.8% who were 65 years of age or older. The median age was 35.1 years. For every 100 females, there were 96.0 males, and for every 100 females age 18 and over there were 93.0 males age 18 and over.

The census reported that 99.98% of the population lived in households, 0.02% (16 people) lived in non-institutionalized group quarters, and no one was institutionalized. 99.9% of residents lived in urban areas, while 0.1% lived in rural areas.

There were 17,704 households in Eastvale, of which 57.4% had children under the age of 18 living in them. Of all households, 70.4% were married-couple households, 4.6% were cohabiting couple households, 10.0% were households with a male householder and no spouse or partner present, and 15.0% were households with a female householder and no spouse or partner present. About 6.1% of all households were made up of individuals and 1.5% had someone living alone who was 65 years of age or older. The average household size was 3.94. There were 16,019 families (90.5% of all households).

There were 18,134 housing units at an average density of 1,430.9 units per square mile (552.5 units/km^{2}). Of these, 17,704 (97.6%) were occupied, 75.4% were owner-occupied, and 24.6% were occupied by renters. The homeowner vacancy rate was 0.8% and the rental vacancy rate was 3.1%.

=== 2023 ACS estimates ===
In 2023, the US Census Bureau estimated that the median household income was $161,322, and the per capita income was $46,449. About 2.9% of families and 3.6% of the population were below the poverty line.

=== 2010 census ===
The 2010 United States census reported that Eastvale had a population of 53,668. The population density was 4,689.0 inhabitants per square mile (1,810.4/km^{2}). The racial makeup of Eastvale was 42.9% (22,998) White (23.7% Non-Hispanic White), 24.2% (13,003) Asian, 9.7% (5,190) African American, 0.5% (290) Native American, 0.4% (198) Pacific Islander, 17.1% (9,172) from other races, and 5.2% (2,817) from two or more races. 40.0% (21,445) of the population were Hispanic or Latino of any race.

The Census reported that 53,660 people (100% of the population) lived in households, 2 (0%) lived in non-institutionalized group quarters, and 6 (0%) were institutionalized.

There were 13,640 households, out of which 8,556 (62.7%) had children under the age of 18 living in them, 9,983 (73.2%) were opposite-sex married couples living together, 1,385 (10.2%) had a female householder with no husband present, 893 (6.5%) had a male householder with no wife present. There were 701 (5.1%) unmarried opposite-sex partnerships, and 109 (0.8%) same-sex married couples or partnerships. 871 households (6.4%) were made up of individuals, and 93 (0.7%) had someone living alone who was 65 years of age or older. The average household size was 3.93. There were 12,261 families (89.9% of all households); the average family size was 4.05.

The population was spread out, with 17,786 people (33.1%) under the age of 18, 4,516 people (8.4%) aged 18 to 24, 18,659 people (34.8%) aged 25 to 44, 10,203 people (19.0%) aged 45 to 64, and 2,504 people (4.7%) who were 65 years of age or older. The median age was 30.9 years. For every 100 females, there were 98.1 males. For every 100 females age 18 and over, there were 96.5 males.

There were 14,494 housing units at an average density of 1,266.4 units per square mile (489.0 units/km^{2}), of which 11,276 (82.7%) were owner-occupied, and 2,364 (17.3%) were occupied by renters. The homeowner vacancy rate was 3.1%; the rental vacancy rate was 3.1%. 43,936 people (81.9% of the population) lived in owner-occupied housing units and 9,724 people (18.1%) lived in rental housing units.

According to the 2010 United States Census, Eastvale had a median household income of $109,841, with 3.6% of the population living below the federal poverty line.

== Economy ==
=== Top employers ===
According to the city's 2023 Comprehensive Annual Financial Report, the top employers in the city are:

#	Employer	# of Employees
1	Amazon Fulfillment Center - LGB3	4,918
2	Walmart Distribution Center	952
3	Corona-Norco Unified School District	755
4	Costco	333
5	Ingram Micro	303
6	Grainger Inc.	250
7	Home Depot	199
8	Komar Distribution Services	161
9	Kohl's	100
10	Albertsons	88

== Government ==
United States presidential election results for Eastvale, California
Year	Republican		Democratic		Third party(ies)	
Year	No.	%	No.	%	No.	%
2012	6,446	42.26%	8,522	55.87%	285	1.87%
2016	7,836	40.06%	10,811	55.27%	912	4.66%
2020	13,276	44.09%	16,340	54.27%	494	1.64%
2024	13,972	50.66%	12,785	46.35%	825	2.99%

=== City government ===
Eastvale's first city council was elected on June 8, 2010, a few months before it was officially incorporated: Adam Rush, Ric Welch, Kelly Howell, Ike C. Bootsma, and Jeff DeGrandpre. Former mayor Jocelyn Yow is the youngest woman of color to ever serve as mayor of a California city.

=== Federal, State, and County government ===
In the United States House of Representatives, Eastvale is split between California's 35th congressional district, represented by Democrat Norma Torres, and California's 41st congressional district, represented by Republican Ken Calvert. Democrats Alex Padilla and Adam Schiff represent California in the United States Senate.

In the California State Senate, Eastvale is in the 31st senatorial district, represented by Democrat Sabrina Cervantes.

In the California State Assembly, Eastvale is split between the 58th Assembly district, represented by Republican Leticia Castillo, and the 63rd Assembly district, represented by Republican Natasha Johnson.

In the Riverside County Board of Supervisors, Eastvale is in the Second District, represented by Karen Spiegel.

== Community ==
A committee of concerned Eastvale residents, the Eastvale Community Committee (ECC), was formed so that issues facing the growing community would be addressed. Formed in 2002, the ECC holds public meetings with county representatives, utility operators, law enforcement agencies, local school representatives, and local business owners. A group of volunteer residents publishes a summary of the meetings and other articles in the quarterly Eastvale Edition which is mailed to most residents and is also available online.

A separate project, Eastvale Events, encourages community involvement by developing and coordinating community events. Eastvale Picnic in the Park, Eastvale Holiday Showcase, and Eastvale Fall Festival are a few of the sponsored events.

== Education ==
The vast majority of Eastvale is a part of the Corona-Norco Unified School District. A portion in the east is in the Jurupa Unified School District.

Schools of the Corona-Norco district in Eastvale:

Elementary schools

- Clara Barton Elementary School
- Harada Elementary School
- Ronald Reagan Elementary School
- Rosa Parks Elementary School
- Eastvale Elementary School
- Rondo School of Discovery
- Academy of Innovation (in and around Eastvale)

Intermediate schools

- River Heights Intermediate School
- Dr. Augustine Ramirez Intermediate School

High schools

- Eleanor Roosevelt High School

== Notable people ==
- Cayla Barnes (born 1999) – Professional Women's Hockey League (PWHL) player and Olympian
- Kiara Fontanilla (born 2000) – soccer player
- Matt Mitchell (born 1999) – basketball player
- Tyler Slavin (born 1992) – NFL player
- Chris Wilcox (born 1997) – NFL player
- Marcus Williams (born 1996) – NFL player
- Jocelyn Yow (born 1995) – mayor of Eastvale
