= Quail Valley =

Quail Valley may refer to:

- Quail Valley, Menifee, California, a community in Menifee, California
- Quail Valley (Missouri City, Texas), a neighborhood in Missouri City, Texas
