= Melvin X =

African-American activist and murder victim (died 1970)

- Born: Melvin Bishop Williams; 1947 or 1948; Texas
- Died: June 6, 1970 (aged 22); Mira Loma, California
- Cause of death: Gunshot
- Resting place: Compton Cemetery
- Education: University of California, Los Angeles
- Organization(s): Harambee Club, Black Student Union, Black Student Alliance, Afrikan Student Union, Organization of Afro-American Unity
- Children: Jabula Williams; Jijane Williams; Melvianne X Williams
- Parent(s): Jessie Leonard; Bishop Williams

Melvin X (born Melvin Bishop Williams; died June 22, 1970) was the cofounder of the Black Student Union at University of California, Los Angeles (UCLA) in 1966.

== Early life ==
Melvin X, born Melvin Bishop Williams, was born in Texas. He moved as a young child to Richmond, California and then finally moved to Los Angeles at age 11. He attended Fremont High School before attending college at UCLA.

== College and adult life ==
Melvin attended the UCLA. He, along with a group of black athletes, cofounded the Black Student Union in 1966 to advocate for the needs of black students on campus. He served for part of his time at UCLA as the club's president. According to Melvin, "We formulated our demands before we even formulated the BSU." He described the BSU as a "vehicle" to carry demands of black students just as better conditions on campus for people of color, mainly through acknowledging and eradicating the presence of racist individuals on campus, specifically in regards to faculty. He was respected among his peers for his "integrity, his consistency, and the courage and the rage that moved him to phenomenon." He related "to all mental levels and had "developed great revolutionary savvy."

Just before Malcolm X was assassinated in 1965, Melvin joined the Organization of Afro-American Unity. Like Malcolm X, Melvin promoted the idea that the civil and political rights of African Americans would next be advanced through violence:

It is by the gun that we have been enslaved and it is only by the gun that we will be liberated

During the late 1960s, he was also known for writing either his name, "Revolution NOW", and other revolutionary sayings on the walls of his ghetto. In 1969, Melvin became the father of twin sons.

== ASU at UCLA ==
The Black Student Union at UCLA was formed in 1966 to advocate for the needs and interests of all UCLA students of African descent. Initiated largely by African-American student athletes, the organization's founding ideology was shaped by the national Civil rights movement, the 1965 Watts riots and the local manifestations of the Black Power movement which emerged in the aftermath of the death of Malcolm X. The organization would go under several name changes, including Black Student Alliance, and ultimately Afrikan Student Union in a merger with approximately 30 other organizations on UCLA's campus.

== Death ==
Melvin X died on June 6, 1970, near Mira Loma, California. He was found at 1 p.m. on June 7 in the driver's seat of a 19 sedan registered to Elaine Parker, also a student at UCLA. The sedan was discovered parked at an abandoned farm, 1 mi (1.6 km) south of the San Bernardino Freeway and 150 ft (46 m) west of Etiwanda Avenue. It was said to be carrying "large quantities of Black activist literature." Parker told reporters for the San Bernardino County Sun that Melvin had borrowed her car Saturday evening to go home to change clothes before taking her to a wedding party. However, he did not return. He was found the following morning with two gunshot wounds to the head, with one of the bullets still lodged in his body and one found inside the vehicle. One shot reportedly entered the front of his head and the other entered from the back. Both shots were fired at close range by someone inside the car. According to the Los Angeles Times, it appeared to be a "gang-type killing."

Marion Alexander Gay was charged, put under arrest and detained, at Clark County Jail in Las Vegas, for the murder of Melvin X in October 1970. He was initially brought in for three charges, including possession of marijuana, possession of stolen credit cards and possession of an unregistered firearm. However, San Bernardino detectives placed a hold on him after obtaining a complaint and warrant charging him with being responsible for the gunshot death. The charges were dropped after Gay submitted and passed a polygraph test on Friday, October 16, 1970. Two other men also submitted tests, as authorities attempted to find out if they had any knowledge regarding the murder. However, no useful information was pulled from these two tests.

== See also ==
- List of unsolved murders (1900–1979)
