= Glen Avon, California =

Glen Avon
- Neighborhood of Jurupa Valley; Former census-designated place
- Location in Riverside County and the state of California

- Location in the United States
- Coordinates: 34°01′02″N 117°29′31″W
- Country: United States
- State: California
- County: Riverside
- Incorporated into Jurupa Valley: July 1, 2011

Area
  - Total: 8.134 sq mi (21.066 km^{2})
  - Land: 8.099 sq mi (20.976 km^{2})
  - Water: 0.035 sq mi (0.090 km^{2}) 0.43%
- Elevation: 750 ft (230 m)

Population (2010)
  - Total: 20,199
  - Density: 2,494.0/sq mi (962.96/km^{2})
- Time zone: UTC-8 (PST)
  - Summer (DST): UTC-7 (PDT)
- ZIP code: 92509
- Area code: 951
- FIPS code: 06-29644
- GNIS feature IDs: 1656528, 2408298

Glen Avon is a neighborhood and former census-designated place (CDP) in Riverside County, California, United States. The population was 20,199 at the 2010 census, up from 14,853 at the 2000 census. On July 1, 2011, the CDP became part of the newly incorporated city of Jurupa Valley.

== Geography ==
Glen Avon is located at 34°1′2″N 117°29′31″W (34.017313, -117.491855).

According to the United States Census Bureau, the CDP has a total area of 8.1 square miles (21 km^{2}), of which, 8.1 square miles (21 km^{2}) of it is land and 0.04 square miles (0.10 km^{2}) of it (0.43%) is water.

== History ==
Established as a subdivision of West Riverside by the Riverside Development Company, it received the name Glen Avon Heights in 1909. In his 1972 history of the Jurupa area, Don Kruz relates that in 1909, residents decided to choose a more distinctive name for their beloved community. Up until then it was considered part of West Riverside. A lottery was proposed, suggestions were put into a hat and one was plucked out. Glen Avon, the winning entry, had been dropped into the hat by a Welshman whose boyhood home was said to have been near the Avon River between two glens. Likely the Village of Glyncorrwg in South Wales which has a deeply wooded glen known as the Corrwg Valley.

=== Incorporation into the city of Jurupa Valley ===
On March 8, 2011, voters passed Measure A by a 54.03% yes vote, incorporating the areas of Mira Loma, Pedley, Rubidoux, Glen Avon, and Sunnyslope into the new city Jurupa Valley. The effective date of incorporation was July 1, 2011.

== Demographics ==
In 2011, Glen Avon was one of nine communities (Belltown, Crestmore Heights CDP, Glen Avon CDP, Indian Hills, Jurupa Hills, Pedley CDP, Rubidoux CDP, Sunnyslope CDP, and Mira Loma CDP) that merged to form the city of Jurupa Valley.

=== 2010 ===
The 2010 United States census reported that Glen Avon had a population of 20,199. The population density was 2,483.4 inhabitants per square mile (958.8/km^{2}). The racial makeup of Glen Avon was 10,272 (50.9%) White, 805 (4.0%) African American, 216 (1.1%) Native American, 462 (2.3%) Asian, 34 (0.2%) Pacific Islander, 7,567 (37.5%) from other races, and 843 (4.2%) from two or more races. Hispanic or Latino of any race were 13,766 persons (68.2%).

The Census reported that 20,101 people (99.5% of the population) lived in households, 24 (0.1%) lived in non-institutionalized group quarters, and 74 (0.4%) were institutionalized.

There were 5,761 households, out of which 2,614 (45.4%) had children under the age of 18 living in them, 2,917 (50.6%) were opposite-sex married couples living together, 795 (13.8%) had a female householder with no husband present, 505 (8.8%) had a male householder with no wife present. There were 406 (7.0%) unmarried opposite-sex partnerships, and 39 (0.7%) same-sex married couples or partnerships. 1,279 households (22.2%) were made up of individuals, and 653 (11.3%) had someone living alone who was 65 years of age or older. The average household size was 3.49. There were 4,217 families (73.2% of all households); the average family size was 4.06.

The population was spread out, with 6,055 people (30.0%) under the age of 18, 2,238 people (11.1%) aged 18 to 24, 5,282 people (26.1%) aged 25 to 44, 4,586 people (22.7%) aged 45 to 64, and 2,038 people (10.1%) who were 65 years of age or older. The median age was 31.7 years. For every 100 females, there were 101.2 males. For every 100 females age 18 and over, there were 99.5 males.

There were 6,203 housing units at an average density of 762.6 per square mile (294.4/km^{2}), of which 3,101 (53.8%) were owner-occupied, and 2,660 (46.2%) were occupied by renters. The homeowner vacancy rate was 2.6%; the rental vacancy rate was 7.4%. 12,244 people (60.6% of the population) lived in owner-occupied housing units and 7,857 people (38.9%) lived in rental housing units.

=== 2000 ===
As of the census of 2000, there were 14,853 people, 4,740 households, and 3,242 families residing in the CDP. The population density was 2,012.0 inhabitants per square mile (776.8/km^{2}). There were 4,936 housing units at an average density of 668.6 per square mile (258.1/km^{2}). The racial makeup of the CDP was 60.8% White, 3.8% Black or African American, 1.5% Native American, 2.2% Asian, 0.2% Pacific Islander, 27.1% from other races, and 4.3% from two or more races. 47.2% of the population were Hispanic or Latino of any race.

There were 4,740 households, out of which 36.3% had children under the age of 18 living with them, 51.6% were married couples living together, 10.8% had a female householder with no husband present, and 31.6% were non-families. 27.0% of all households were made up of individuals, and 14.4% had someone living alone who was 65 years of age or older. The average household size was 3.1 and the average family size was 3.8.

In the CDP the population was spread out, with 30.8% under the age of 18, 9.2% from 18 to 24, 27.4% from 25 to 44, 20.9% from 45 to 64, and 11.7% who were 65 years of age or older. The median age was 33 years. For every 100 females, there were 99.3 males. For every 100 females age 18 and over, there were 97.5 males.

The median income for a household in the CDP was $37,152, and the median income for a family was $43,664. Males had a median income of $30,925 versus $23,927 for females. The per capita income for the CDP was $14,943. About 13.6% of families and 17.5% of the population were below the poverty line, including 25.9% of those under age 18 and 12.5% of those age 65 or over.

== Government ==
In the California State Legislature, Glen Avon is in the 31st senatorial district, represented by Democrat Sabrina Cervantes, and in the 58th Assembly district, represented by Republican Leticia Castillo.

In the United States House of Representatives, Glen Avon is in California's 39th congressional district, represented by Democrat Mark Takano.

== See also ==
- Stringfellow Acid Pits
