= Jocelyn Yow =

American politician

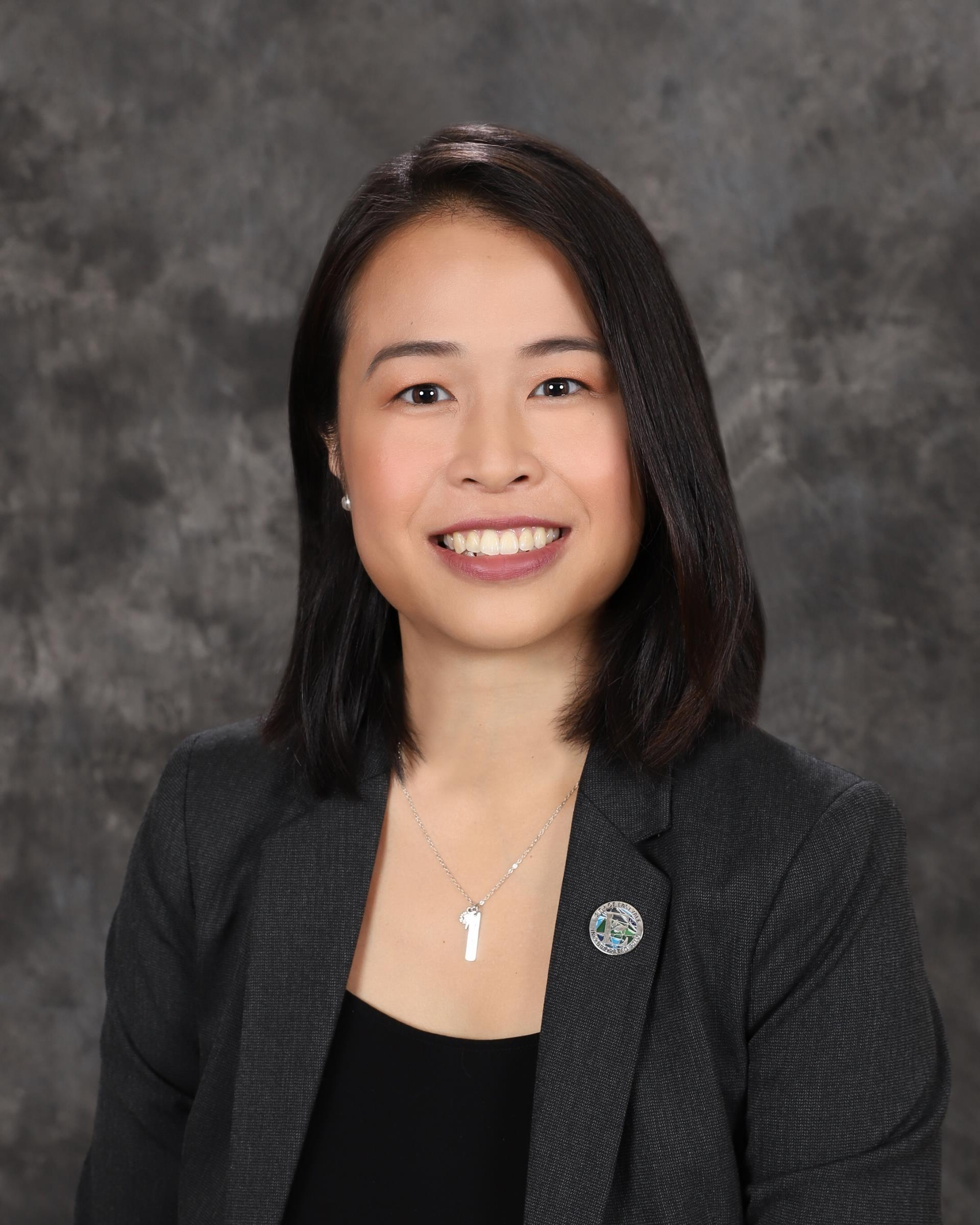

Mayor of Eastvale
- Incumbent
- Assumed office December 10, 2020

Member of the Eastvale City Council for District 4
- Incumbent
- Assumed office December 2018

Personal details
- Born: 1995 (age 30–31) San Jose, California, U.S.
- Party: Democratic
- Education: Norco College (AA); University of California, Berkeley; Harvard Extension School

Jocelyn Yow (born 1995) is an American politician serving as a member of the Eastvale, California city council for district 4 since December 2018. She also serves as the Legislative Advocacy Director at IGNITE National, a non-profit organization that works to elect young women into office. On December 10, 2020, Yow was sworn in as mayor of Eastvale, making her the youngest woman of color (25 years old at the time) to serve as mayor in a California city.

== Early life and education ==
Yow was born in San Jose, California. She is the daughter of a Malaysian Chinese father and Vietnamese refugee mother. Her father grew up in a small village in Malaysia and moved to the United States in the 1980s to pursue engineering at the University of Arizona, becoming the first from his village to go there. Her mother grew up in Vietnam but fled to a refugee camp in Malaysia as a result of the Vietnam War. Thereafter, she moved to the United States where she met Yow's father. When Yow was one year old, her family moved from the United States to Kedah, Malaysia, in order to take care of her ill grandfather. During her time there, she studied at SMJK Keat Hwa in Alor Setar. As a kid, she joined several service-oriented organizations through her parents' guidance such as Lions Club, the World Association of Girl Guides, and Girl Scouts. She learned English through watching American media such as Disney Channel, HBO, and Hallmark. However, she is also a native speaker of Chinese and Malay. In 2011 (age 16), she moved back to the United States, settling in Eastvale, California in hopes of attending college. A few years later (2014), she graduated from Norco College with an associate degree in Social and Behavioral Sciences. There, she was a member of the Honors Program and Alpha Gamma Sigma. She was also the youngest student body president and served as student commencement speaker. She then transferred to the University of California, Berkeley and earned a bachelor's degree. Recently, she earned her master's degree in government from Harvard Extension School.

== Political career ==
Prior to running for city council, Yow was a district representative for the California State Senate and an immigration specialist at the United States House of Representatives. Yow also served as staffer to Speaker of the House Nancy Pelosi and congressman Gil Cisneros.

In 2018, she ran for Eastvale City Council at the age of 23. She won a seat on the city council by a 40-point margin and became the first woman of color to become an Eastvale city councilmember. She was also the first Malaysian American to hold a position in public office in the United States. She was then appointed as mayor on December 10, 2020, becoming the youngest woman of color in a California city to do so.

Her main goal as mayor was to implement Eastvale's first library. She successfully secured $2.5 of the $30 million necessary for this project in private funding which starts building in 2023. As mayor, she also secured $8 million in funding for Eastvale's police station, spearheaded the Eastvale Little Library project, and served as advisor of the Eastvale Youth Council.

In 2021, Yow served as Policy Manager at IGNITE National. She was later promoted to Legislative Advocacy Director.

In 2022, Yow ran for re-election in District 4 of Eastvale, winning by 69.77% of the votes. She was endorsed by elected officials such as Corona City Former Mayor/Councilmember Jacque Casillas, Jurupa Valley Mayor Chris Barajas, and several others.

== Awards ==
In 2019, Yow was awarded the Alumnus of the Year Award by Norco College in addition to being a scholarship donor. She also earned the Rising Star Award from the California Democratic Party, Asian Pacific Islander Caucus.

== Personal life ==
Yow is a survivor of intimate partner violence. From this relationship, she had a son, Kayden, in May 2020. She is a single mother.

Yow has a younger brother.

She hopes to become a community college professor in the near future as it is a system that benefited her and her family greatly.
