= Jurupa Valley, California =

City in California, United States

- City
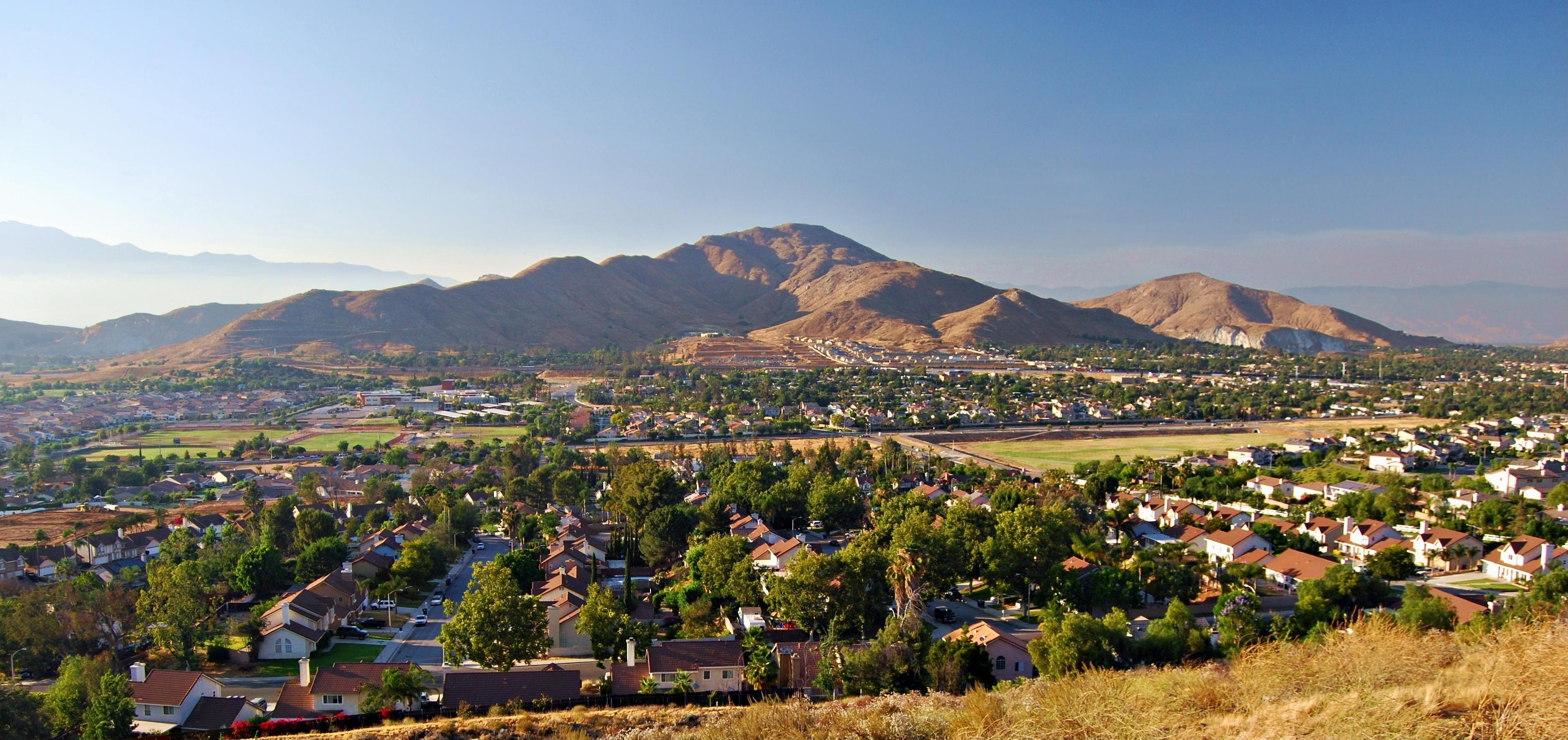

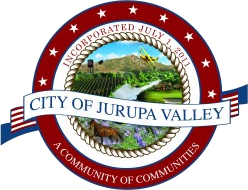
- Seal
- Nickname: "Jurupa"
- Interactive map of Jurupa Valley, California
- Location in the United States Jurupa Valley (California) Jurupa Valley (the United States)
- Coordinates: 34°00′N 117°29′W
- Country: United States
- State: California
- County: Riverside
- Incorporated (city): July 1, 2011

Government
  - Type: Council–manager
  - Mayor: Brian Berkson
  - Mayor Pro Tem: Chris Barajas
  - City Council: Council members: Armando Carmona; Guillermo Silva; Veronica Sanchez
  - City Manager: Rod Butler
  - Assistant City Manager: Michael Flad

Area
  - City: 43.68 sq mi (113.13 km^{2})
  - Land: 42.94 sq mi (111.22 km^{2})
  - Water: 0.74 sq mi (1.91 km^{2})

Population (2020)
  - City: 105,053
  - Rank: 6th in Riverside County; 64th in California; 304th in the United States
  - Density: 2,446.51/sq mi (944.60/km^{2})
  - Metro: 4,527,837
- Time zone: UTC−8 (PST)
  - Summer (DST): UTC−7 (PDT)
- ZIP codes: 91752, 92509
- Area code: 951
- FIPS code: 06-37692
- GNIS feature ID: 2702867
- Website: jurupavalley.org

Jurupa Valley (/həˈrupə/ huh-ROO-puh; Spanish: [xu'rupa]; Serrano: Hurumpa) is a city in the Inland Empire region of northwestern Riverside County, California, United States. It was the location of one of the earliest non-native settlements in the county, Rancho Jurupa. The rancho was initially an outpost of the Mission San Gabriel Arcángel, then a Mexican land grant in 1838. Its name is derived from a Native American village that existed in the area prior to the arrival of Europeans.

On March 8, 2011, voters approved a ballot measure A to incorporate and form the city of Jurupa Valley. The effective date of incorporation was July 1, 2011. Residents of the area had previously voted on incorporation in 1992, but rejected that measure, along with a competing ballot measure that would have incorporated Mira Loma. Jurupa Valley was the latest city in California to incorporate until 2024 when Mountain House incorporated in San Joaquin County.

The city of Jurupa Valley covers about 43.5 square miles (113 km^{2}), and had a population of 105,053 as of the 2020 census. It is bordered by the cities of Eastvale, Norco, and Riverside in Riverside County and the cities of Ontario, Fontana, Rialto, Bloomington, and Colton in neighboring San Bernardino County.

== History ==
The area was first inhabited by the Gabrielino and Serrano tribes.

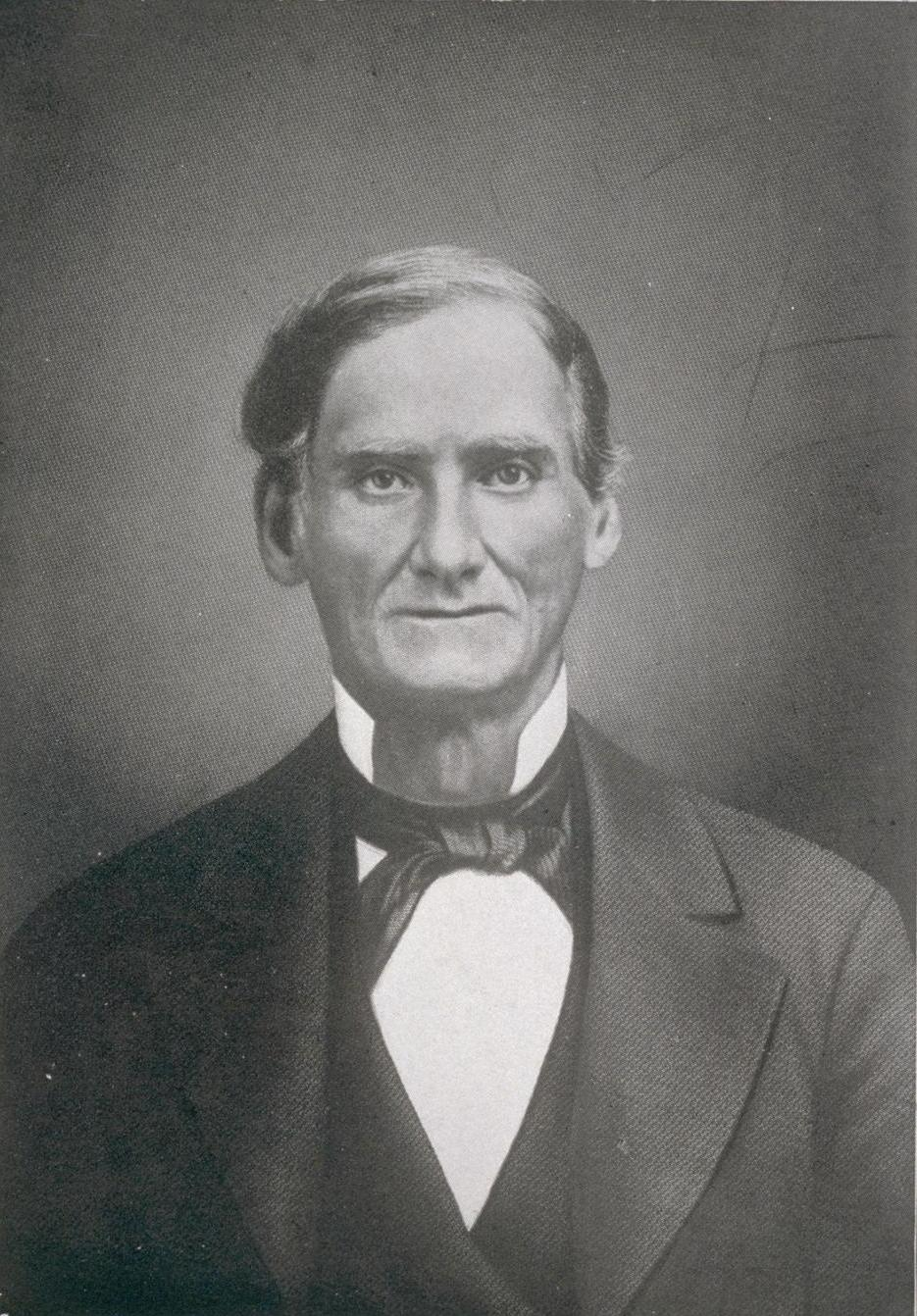
Jurupa Valley traces its history to Rancho Jurupa, a Mexican-era rancho granted to Don Juan Bandini, a noted Californio entrepreneur, in 1838.

=== Etymology ===
Although no geographic feature or town was officially named Jurupa Valley prior to the establishment of the city in 2011, the term is known to have been used as early as 1887 when referring to lands along the northeast side of the Santa Ana River opposite the city of Riverside. The name "Jurupa" was derived from the 1838 Mexican land grant Rancho Jurupa, which the Jurupa Valley area had been part of. The rancho, in turn, derived its name from a previous Jurupa rancho operated by the Mission San Gabriel Arcángel, until the mission was disbanded through the Mexican Secularization Act of 1833. The first rancho was named for the Native American village Jurupa that existed in the area prior to the arrival of Mexican colonizers. Both Serrano and Gabrieleño peoples lived in the area. The Gabrieleño referred to the village as Jurungna or Hurungna.

The exact meaning of the word "jurupa" is disputed. The 1890 book, An Illustrated History of Southern California, states that the word was a greeting, meaning ″peace and friendship″, used by the Native Americans when the first Catholic priest visited the area. In 1902, Father Juan Caballeria, in his History of San Bernardino Valley; From the Padres to the Pioneer, states that the word was derived from jurumpa, meaning watering place. Later linguistic studies concluded that the name likely refers to juru, Artemisia californica (California sagebrush), common in the area.

=== Incorporation ===
On June 2, 1992, under measures E, F, and G, the first effort to form a city was voted down by the electorate. Measure E, whether or not to incorporate Jurupa and Mira Loma, lost 76% to 24%. Measure F, whether to vote city council members by district or at large, if incorporation passed, was 69% district, and 31% at large. Measure G, the selection of a city name, had the following results: Jurupa 40%, Rancho Jurupa 23%, West Riverside 21%, and Camino Real 16%. At the time, Jurupa was described as including the neighborhoods of Rubidoux, Pedley, and Glen Avon.

On March 8, 2011, a second proposal for incorporation was put before the voters. This time, the measure passed with 54% voting yes, 46% voting no, and with an effective date of July 1, 2011. At the time, the new city was estimated to have a population of 88,000, and included the communities of Mira Loma, Glen Avon, Sky Country, Indian Hills, Pedley, Rubidoux, Belltown, Jurupa, Jurupa Hills, and Sunnyslope.

The city immediately faced the possibility of disincorporation when the California Senate passed Bill 89, which shifted millions of dollars of vehicle license fees away from cities. The new city struggled for several years, and in 2014 notified the Riverside County Local Agency Formation Commission that it might be necessary to disincorporate. In September 2015, Senate Bill 25 was passed by the California Assembly and Senate to restore funding to cities, but was vetoed by then-Governor Jerry Brown. Later in the month, Senate Bill 107 was signed by the governor. It remediated many of the outstanding debts of Jurupa Valley, as well as three other recently incorporated cities in Riverside County.

=== Historic events ===
- Between 1926 and 1928, the Wineville Chicken Coop Murders, a series of abductions and murders of young boys, took place within Jurupa Valley city limits. At the time, the community of Wineville was unincorporated. Today, it is the Jurupa Valley neighborhood of Mira Loma.
- The Stringfellow Acid Pits, a toxic waste dump and a Superfund site, became the center of national news coverage in the early 1980s.

== Demographics ==
Historical population
Census	Pop.	Note	%±
2020	105,053		—
U.S. Decennial Census

The city of Jurupa Valley was incorporated in 2011 out of the amalgamation of nine communities: Belltown, Crestmore Heights CDP, Glen Avon CDP, Indian Hills, Jurupa Hills, Mira Loma CDP, Pedley CDP, Rubidoux CDP, and Sunnyslope CDP.

=== 2020 census ===
Jurupa Valley city, California – Racial and ethnic composition Note: the US Census treats Hispanic/Latino as an ethnic category. This table excludes Latinos from the racial categories and assigns them to a separate category. Hispanics/Latinos may be of any race.
Race / Ethnicity (NH = Non-Hispanic)	Pop 2020	% 2020
White alone (NH)	19,187	18.26%
Black or African American alone (NH)	3,529	3.36%
Native American or Alaska Native alone (NH)	240	0.23%
Asian alone (NH)	5,281	5.03%
Native Hawaiian or Pacific Islander alone (NH)	237	0.23%
Other race alone (NH)	534	0.51%
Mixed race or multiracial (NH)	1,998	1.90%
Hispanic or Latino (any race)	74,407	70.49%
Total	105,053	100.00%

According to the United States Census Bureau, as of 2020, the population was 105,053 with 71.4% of the population of Jurupa Valley being Hispanic or Latino, 20.6% White non-Hispanic, 3.2% Black or African American, 3.6% Asian, and 3.6% of two races or more.

== Government and politics ==
United States presidential election results for Jurupa Valley, California
Year	Republican		Democratic		Third party(ies)	
Year	No.	%	No.	%	No.	%
2012	8,757	40.84%	12,142	56.62%	545	2.54%
2016	9,584	36.98%	14,906	57.51%	1,427	5.51%
2020	14,584	40.06%	21,046	57.81%	777	2.13%
2024	16,064	49.35%	15,577	47.85%	913	2.80%

=== Local government ===
Jurupa Valley is governed by a city council, whose members represent specific districts of the city. The city council is led by the mayor, who is elected by and among the councilors. The mayor serves a one-year term, while councilmembers serve for four years.

Jurupa Valley lies within District Two of Riverside County, represented by Supervisor Karen Spiegel. Eastern Jurupa Valley will become part of District One in January 2025 due to redistricting.

City parks are served and maintained by the Jurupa Area Recreation and Parks District. Water and Sanitation is provided by the Jurupa Community Services District and Rubidoux Community Services District.

=== State and federal representation ===
In the California State Senate, Jurupa Valley is in the 31st senatorial district, represented by Democrat Sabrina Cervantes.

In the California State Assembly, Jurupa Valley is in the 58th Assembly district, represented by Republican Leticia Castillo.

In the House of Representatives, Jurupa Valley lies entirely within the 39th Congressional District, represented by Democrat Mark Takano.

California is represented in the United States Senate by Democrats Adam Schiff and Alex Padilla.

=== Politics ===
As of February 10, 2023, 51,709 registered voters were in Jurupa Valley. Of these, 23,505 (45.5%) are registered Democrats, 13,254 (25.6%) are registered Republicans, 11,330 (21.9%) are independent, and 3,350 (6.5%) are registered with other parties.

== Education ==
Jurupa Valley is home to the Jurupa Unified School District, which covers the vast majority of the municipality. The district operates seventeen elementary schools, four middle schools, two continuation schools, and three high schools, including:

- Jurupa Valley High School
- Rubidoux High School
- Patriot High School

A small portion of Jurupa Valley attends schools in the Corona-Norco Unified School District.

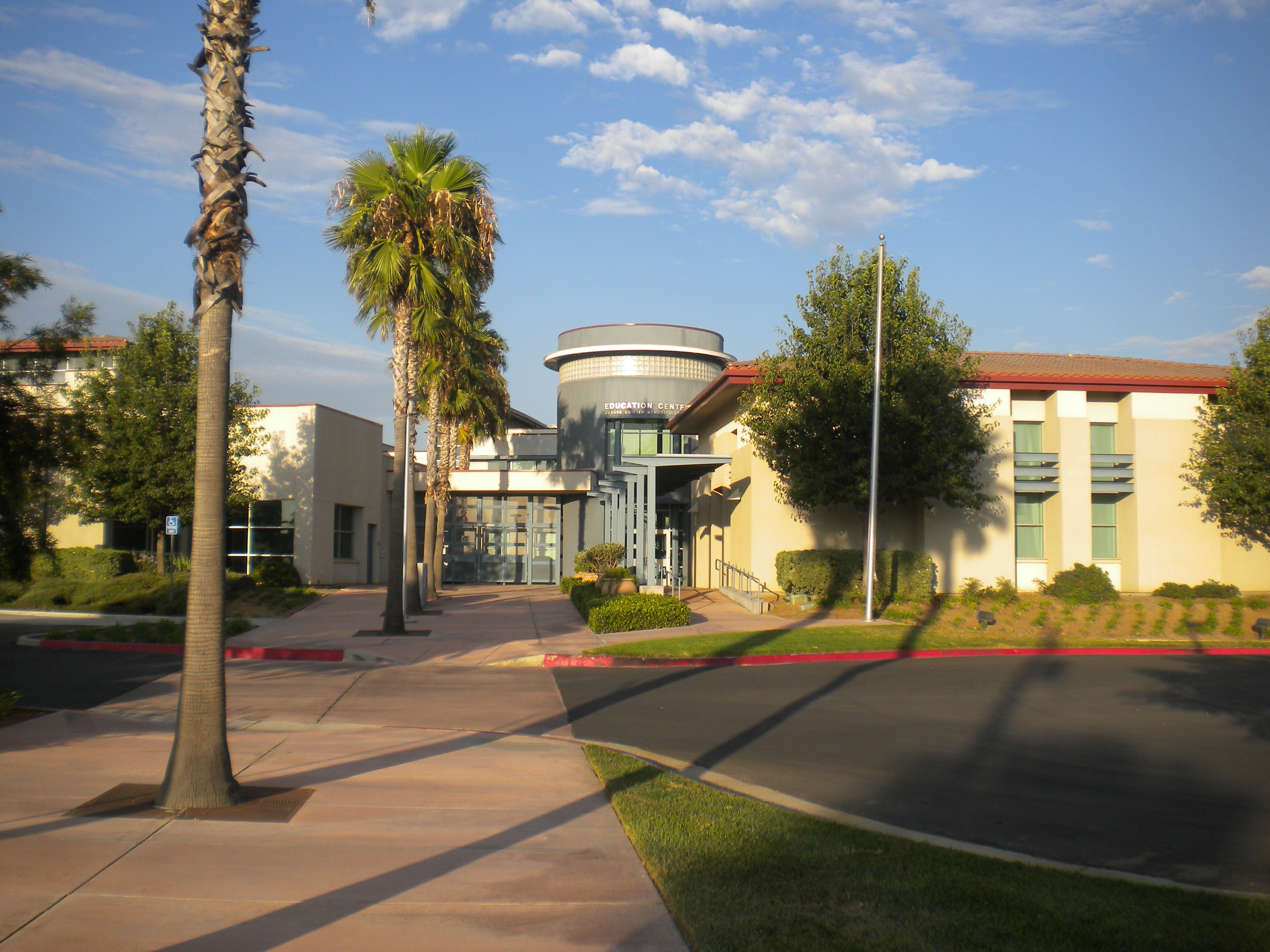
Jurupa Unified School District, 2011

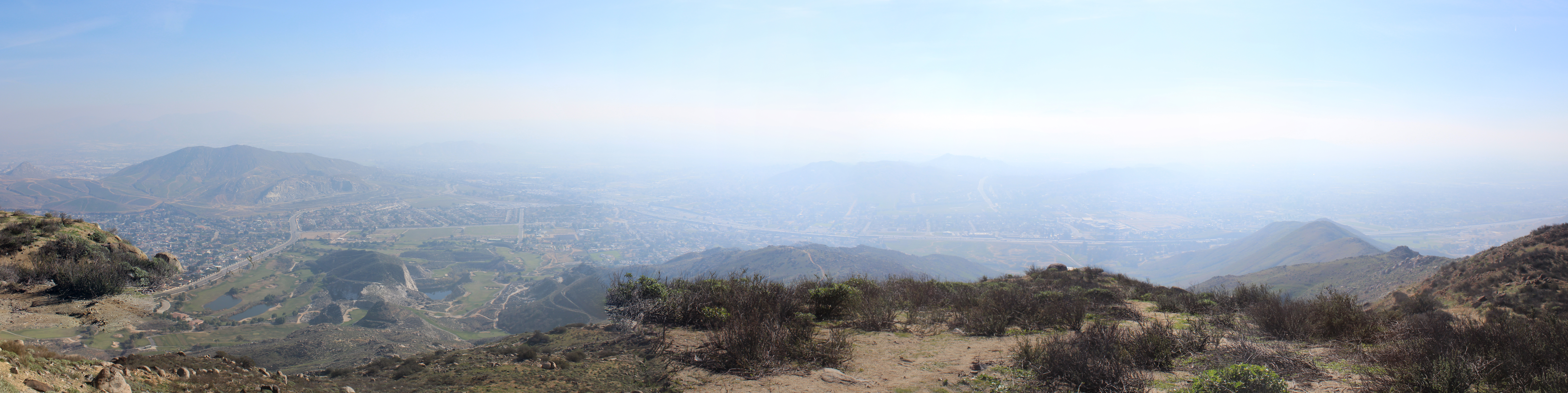
Jurupa Valley as seen from the Jurupa Hills, 2015

== Transportation ==
Public transportation in Jurupa Valley is provided by Riverside Transit Agency. Also, Jurupa Valley/Pedley station (formerly Pedley Station) is served by Metrolink. Jurupa Valley is home to Flabob Airport, a small public-use airport. However, commercial flights are served by the nearby Ontario International Airport.

The major freeways in Jurupa Valley are Interstate 15, which serves as the city's western border, and California State Route 60, which runs along the northern side of the city.

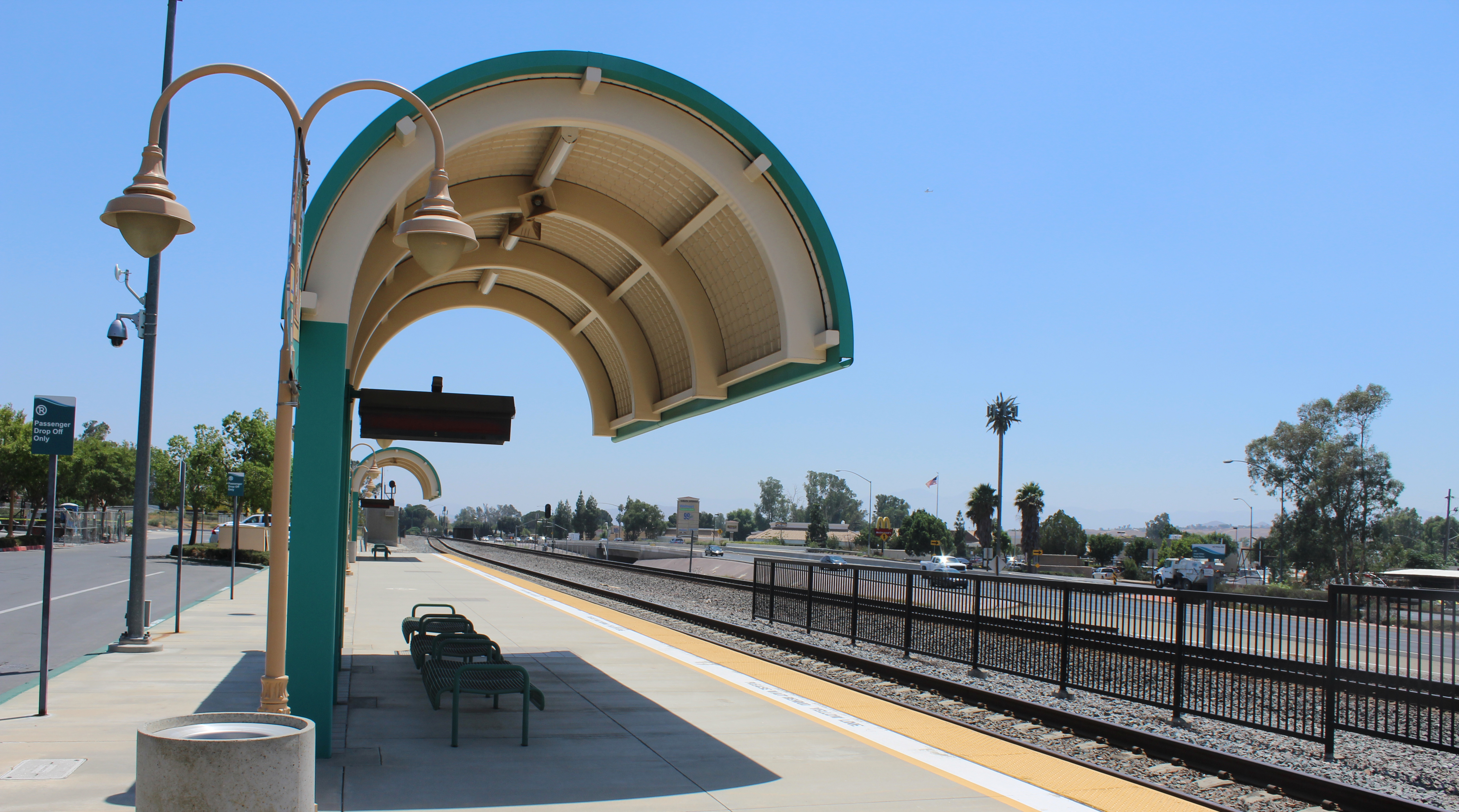
Metrolink Jurupa Valley/Pedley Station, 2017

== Culture, sports, and recreation ==
Notable sites include:

- Jensen Alvarado Ranch
- Jurupa Mountains Discovery Center
- Rancho Jurupa Regional Park
- Golf facilities:
  - Goose Creek Golf Club
  - Indian Hills Country Club
  - Jurupa Hills Country Club
  - Oak Quarry Golf Club

== Geography ==
Jurupa Valley is located north and west of the Santa Ana River across from Riverside, California, south of the Riverside–San Bernardino county line, and east of Interstate 15. It includes the nine distinct neighborhoods, or communities, of Belltown, Crestmore Heights, Glen Avon, Indian Hills, Jurupa Hills, Pedley, Rubidoux, Sunnyslope, and Mira Loma.

=== Climate ===
Climate data for Jurupa Valley, California
Month	Jan	Feb	Mar	Apr	May	Jun	Jul	Aug	Sep	Oct	Nov	Dec	Year
Record high °F (°C)	91 (33)	92 (33)	100 (38)	101 (38)	107 (42)	110 (43)	110 (43)	112 (44)	115 (46)	108 (42)	99 (37)	92 (33)	115 (46)
Mean daily maximum °F (°C)	67 (19)	68 (20)	71 (22)	77 (25)	80 (27)	88 (31)	93 (34)	95 (35)	91 (33)	83 (28)	74 (23)	69 (21)	80 (27)
Mean daily minimum °F (°C)	42 (6)	44 (7)	46 (8)	48 (9)	53 (12)	58 (14)	64 (18)	66 (19)	62 (17)	53 (12)	45 (7)	42 (6)	52 (11)
Record low °F (°C)	24 (−4)	27 (−3)	28 (−2)	31 (−1)	32 (0)	44 (7)	49 (9)	48 (9)	42 (6)	31 (−1)	26 (−3)	23 (−5)	22 (−6)
Average precipitation inches (mm)	3.45 (88)	3.62 (92)	2.91 (74)	.88 (22)	.26 (6.6)	.03 (0.76)	.05 (1.3)	.15 (3.8)	.27 (6.9)	.56 (14)	1.34 (34)	2.72 (69)	16.24 (412)
Average precipitation days	6.6	7.2	5.3	3.5	1.4	0.3	0.8	1.0	1.3	2.5	4.4	6.4	40.7
