= Sun City, Menifee, California =

Community in Menifee, California, United States

Sun City is a former census-designated place (CDP) in Riverside County, California, United States, and now a neighborhood of the city of Menifee, California. Along with the neighboring communities of Quail Valley and Menifee, it was incorporated as part of the City of Menifee on October 1, 2008. The population when Sun City was a CDP was 17,773 at the 2000 census. Sun City is located along Interstate 215 just south of the city of Perris.

As of 2022, there are 26,987 residents in Sun City, with a median age of 47. Of this, 49.17% are males and 50.83% are females. US-born citizens make up 85.81% of the resident pool in Sun City, while non-US-born citizens account for 9.77%.

Sun City is a master-planned community for senior citizens over age 55. The four-square-mile residential community has one public golf course, two recreation centers with tennis courts, paddle ball courts, lawn bowling grassed courts and two swimming pools, and a commercial center consisting of supermarkets, small retail shops, full service restaurants, and quick-service restaurants. The site planning of the planned community began in 1960, making it the second retirement community originated by Del Webb, and groundbreaking occurred in December 1961. This original Sun City SoCal (Southern California) was one of the four "Sun Cities" designed hands-on by Del Webb.

== History ==
Sun City began in what is known as the Perris Valley, so known since 1885, when the community of Perris was established along the newly built Southern California Railroad certified to connect the cities of Barstow and San Diego. Until 1957, there was little change in this sparsely populated rural grassland valley. In 1957, Richard Rand, a land developer who hoped to promote a planned community called Ransdale, purchased the Newport Ranch. A small motel and office were as far as his plans progressed.

In 1959, Del Webb arrived. The concept of an active retirement community was relatively new and Webb was in the process of developing the Sun City community in Arizona, which was experiencing success greater than expected. He started looking for reasonably priced land in Southern California to develop another Sun City where the sun shined 200+ days, preferably equidistant to San Diego and Los Angeles. Webb started buying large parcels from Rand and other farmers in Menifee Valley. He ended up buying 14,000 acres from Scott Road north to Ethanac Road for $500 to $900 an acre.

=== Timeline ===
- 1961: Grading began in December for Sun City with a projected opening date of June 1962.
- 1962: The Kings Inn motel and restaurant was constructed on the corner of Bradley Road and Cherry Hills Boulevard. When the June opening arrived, the Civic Center was in place, along with model homes and the golf course seeded and soon to be playable. There were 100,000 visitors and 272 homes were sold in three days south of The Kings Inn. The shopping center across the street from the Kings Inn opened shortly afterwards in July 1962. The new shopping center near U.S. Highway 395 had a Mayfair Market and Sprouse-Reitz. The first church, United Church Sun City, opens in the brand new Webb Hall of Sun City Civic Association at 26850 Sun City Boulevard. The Greek outdoor theatre is also built.
- 1963: The town's first gas station, a Union 76, also opens in the shopping center at the northwest corner of Bradley Road and Cherry Hills Boulevard. Decades later, this Union 76 would be abandoned and replaced by the new Sun City Library in 2008. The Kings Inn expands with the addition of 56 rooms. The Cherry Hills Golf Course opens.
- 1964: 3,500 people were living in Sun City. Security First National Bank is built in the shopping center parking plaza at Bradley near Cherry Hills Blvd. It would be torn down 2008 and replaced by a newer Sun City Library. Expansion of the shopping center begins with construction of a western wing. The town's second gas station, Texaco, is built at 28200 Bradley Road, and is currently Bradley Auto Service.
- 1965: Bank of America opens at 26800 Cherry Hills Boulevard. The new west wing addition to the shopping center is officially completed. Provident Federal Savings Bank opens in this wing. Grand Avenue (now McCall Boulevard) is developed and built from Sun City Blvd on west side of developing Sun City to the east side of U.S. Highway 395. United Church Sun City builds a church at 26701 McCall Boulevard.
- 1966: McCall Boulevard is extended east to Menifee Road. Two new gas stations are built: Shell at 26730 McCall and Standard at 26980 McCall. The sole Catholic church, St. Vincent Ferrer, opens at 27931 Murrieta Road.
- 1967: U.S. Highway 395 is upgraded as a freeway south from Ethanac Road to just south of the McCall Boulevard exit, replacing Antelope Road as Highway 395. Bradley Road is also extended throughout the year to flank the east side of the shopping plaza, skirted by the newly completed US Hwy 395, and ending at Rouse Road. The Standard Gas Station opens at 26980 McCall Blvd and remains a Standard, later Chevron for over 50 years to the present day. Sun City Shell Gas opens at 26730 McCall Blvd. It is a Union 76 today. The current Sun City Gardens Retirement Community is built on the south side of town at 28500 Bradley Rd. A brick medical building opens nearby at 28401 Bradley Rd. The first mobile home park on the east side of the freeway begins construction and will become Bel Air Mobile Estates.
- 1968: The current Sun City Post Office is built at 26822 Cherry Hills Blvd. A 7-Eleven opens at 27188 Sun City Blvd (currently a dental office.) An Arco Gas Station opens at NW Corner of 26670 McCall & Sun City Blvd. Another gas station opens on east side of US Highway 395 at 27181 McCall Blvd. It is now a Gulf fuel station.
- 1969: The entire Sun City Civic Association, including the swimming pool, Greek theatre, and other amenities, is completed.
- 1970: Population is now 5,519. Julene Convalescent Hospital (currently Menifee Lakes Post-Acute) opens.
- 1971: The first homes in Sun City on the east side of U.S. Highway 395 are built on Encanto Drive.
- 1974: Del Webb dies.
- 1975: A second golf course under the Del Webb Corp, the North Golf Course, opens at 26660 McCall Blvd. The Bel Air Strip Plaza is built along the frontage road (Encanto Drive) alongside the freeway.
- 1976: United California Bank opens at 27385 Sun City Blvd (where the current Wells Fargo is today).
- 1980: Population is now 8,460. The Kings Inn motel and restaurant closes.
- 1982: The former Kings Inn motel buildings are moved to a new location on Encanto Drive. The former restaurant remains.
- 1988: The former Kings Inn restaurant building and remaining structures are demolished.
- 1990: Population is 14,390
- 1994: The expanding Sun City Library takes over the former Security Pacific Bank at 26982 Cherry Hills Blvd

== Geography ==
Sun City is located at 33°42′29″N 117°11′56″W.

According to the United States Census Bureau, the CDP had a total area of 7.8 square miles (20.2 km^{2}), all of it land.

=== Climate ===
The climate in this area is described by the Köppen Climate Classification System as "dry-summer subtropical" often referred to as "Mediterranean" and abbreviated as Csa.

Climate data for Sun City, California
Month	Jan	Feb	Mar	Apr	May	Jun	Jul	Aug	Sep	Oct	Nov	Dec	Year
Mean daily maximum °F (°C)	69 (21)	69 (21)	72 (22)	79 (26)	85 (29)	92 (33)	100 (38)	100 (38)	95 (35)	85 (29)	76 (24)	69 (21)	83 (28)
Mean daily minimum °F (°C)	36 (2)	39 (4)	41 (5)	44 (7)	50 (10)	54 (12)	59 (15)	59 (15)	57 (14)	49 (9)	40 (4)	34 (1)	48 (9)
Average precipitation inches (mm)	2.7 (69)	3.2 (81)	2 (51)	0.7 (18)	0.3 (7.6)	0 (0)	0 (0)	0.2 (5.1)	0.2 (5.1)	0.2 (5.1)	0.7 (18)	1 (25)	11.2 (280)
Source: Weatherchannel

== Demographics ==
Historical population
Census	Pop.	Note	%±
1970	5,519		—
1980	8,460		53.3%
1990	14,390		70.1%
2000	17,773		23.5%
U.S. Decennial Census

As of the census of 2000, there were 17,773 people, 8,750 households, and 5,197 families residing in the community when it was still a CDP. The population density was 2,280.0 inhabitants per square mile (880.3/km^{2}). There were 9,440 housing units at an average density of 1,211.0 per square mile (467.6/km^{2}). The racial makeup of the CDP was 89.63% White, 2.13% African American, 0.51% Native American, 1.19% Asian, 0.15% Pacific Islander, 4.11% from other races, and 2.29% from two or more races. Hispanic or Latino of any race were 12.31% of the population.

There were 8,750 households, out of which 12.7% had children under the age of 18 living with them, 52.6% were married couples living together, 5.2% had a female householder with no husband present, and 40.6% were non-families. 37.5% of all households were made up of individuals, and 31.1% had someone living alone who was 65 years of age or older. The average household size was 1.99 and the average family size was 2.57.

In the CDP the population was spread out, with 14.2% under the age of 18, 2.6% from 18 to 24, 13.2% from 25 to 44, 18.0% from 45 to 64, and 51.9% who were 65 years of age or older. The median age was 66 years. For every 100 females there were 78.9 males. For every 100 females age 18 and over, there were 74.9 males. Sun City is renowned for a large senior citizen population, most of them are white non-Hispanic Americans. Sun City has multiple ethnic ancestral groups and the area has a sizable American Jewish community.

The median income for a household in the CDP was $29,814, and the median income for a family was $38,131. Males had a median income of $41,174 versus $29,036 for females. The per capita income for the CDP was $19,859. About 6.0% of families and 8.8% of the population were below the poverty line, including 14.4% of those under age 18 and 6.5% of those age 65 or over.

White-collar workers make up 71.59% of the working population in Sun City, while blue-collar employees account for 28.41%. There are also 969 entrepreneurs in Sun City (10.08% of the workforce); 6,690 workers employed in private companies (69.58%); and 1,546 people working in governmental institutions (16.08%).

There are a total of 11,136 households in Sun City, each made up of around 3 members. Family establishments represent 58.41% of these Sun City households, while non-family units account for the remaining 41.58%. Additionally, 20.1% of households have children and 79.9% of households are without children.

The average annual household income in Sun City is $82,505, while the median household income sits at $70,013 per year. Residents aged 25 to 44 earn $95,818, while those between 45 and 64 years old have a median wage of $77,575. In contrast, people younger than 25 and those older than 65 earn less, at $37,270 and $47,152, respectively.

There are 11,962 housing units in Sun City, and the median year in which these properties were built is 1990. Of the 11,136 occupied housing units in Sun City, 74.5% are owner-occupied, while 25.49% have renters living in them. Meanwhile, properties bought with mortgages account for 65.14% of the units, and the median value of a home with a mortgage is $342,650. In general, housing costs reach $1,616 per month in Sun City.

Housing Units 11,962 6.7% Median Year Built 1990 0.0% Built in 1939 or Earlier 186 -17.0% Built between 1940 and 1949 64 -28.1% Built between 1950 and 1959 425 40.7% Built between 1960 and 1969 2,756 8.3% Built between 1970 and 1979 2,033 6.8% Built between 1980 and 1989 3,103 2.9% Built between 1990 and 1999 1,410 7.8% Built between 2000 and 2009 1,379 5.0% Built in 2010 or Later 606 N/A

== Politics ==
In the California State Legislature, Sun City is in the 32nd Senate District, represented by Republican Kelly Seyarto, and in the 63rd Assembly District, represented by Republican Bill Essayli until April 2025.
