= Mira Loma, California =

Mira Loma
- Neighborhood of Jurupa Valley; Former census-designated place
- Location in Riverside County and the state of California

- Location in the United States
- Coordinates: 33°59′05″N 117°30′55″W
- Country: United States
- State: California
- County: Riverside
- Incorporated into Jurupa Valley: July 1, 2011

Area
  - Total: 8.149 sq mi (21.107 km^{2})
  - Land: 7.997 sq mi (20.712 km^{2})
  - Water: 0.153 sq mi (0.395 km^{2}) 1.87%
- Elevation: 720 ft (220 m)

Population (2010)
  - Total: 21,930
  - Density: 2,742/sq mi (1,059/km^{2})
- Time zone: UTC-8 (PST)
  - Summer (DST): UTC-7 (PDT)
- ZIP code: 91752
- Area code: 951
- FIPS code: 06-47976
- GNIS feature ID: 1656568

Mira Loma (Spanish for "Look Hill"), now officially a neighborhood of Jurupa Valley, formerly was a census-designated place (CDP) in Riverside County, California, United States. Its population was 21,930 in the 2010 census, up from 17,617 in the 2000 census.

Mira Loma was known as Wineville prior to 1930. The name was changed that year to help disassociate the community from the Wineville Chicken Coop murders.

== Boundary changes ==
In 2010, parts of Mira Loma became part of the newly incorporated city of Eastvale, California.

On July 1, 2011, parts of Mira Loma became part of the newly incorporated city of Jurupa Valley, California.

== Geography ==
According to the United States Census Bureau, the CDP has a total area of 8.1 square miles (21 km^{2}), of which, 8.0 square miles (21 km^{2}) of it is land and 0.2 square miles (0.52 km^{2}) of it (1.87%) is water.

== History ==
Rancho Jurupa/Jurupa Valley was originally granted by the Mexican government to Sn. Dn. Juan Bandini, on September 28, 1838.

Originally known as Wineville, it is located in the modern day "Jurupa" area of unincorporated Riverside County. It is separated from the city of Riverside by the Santa Ana River to the south, borders the Ontario/Fontana area of San Bernardino County to the north and west, and Pedley / Glen Avon to the east. The community officially changed its name from Wineville on November 1, 1930, due in large part to the negative publicity surrounding the Wineville Chicken Coop murders.

=== Incorporation into the City of Jurupa Valley ===
On March 8, 2011, voters passed Measure A by a 54.03% YES vote, incorporating the areas of Mira Loma, Pedley, Rubidoux, Glen Avon, and Sunnyslope into the new city of Jurupa Valley. The effective date of incorporation was July 1, 2011.

== Demographics ==
=== 2010 ===
In the 2010 census Mira Loma had a population of 21,930. The population density was 2,691.0 inhabitants per square mile (1,039.0/km^{2}). The racial makeup of Mira Loma was 12,577 (57.4%) White, 383 (1.7%) African American, 240 (1.1%) Native American, 465 (2.1%) Asian, 43 (0.2%) Pacific Islander, 7,250 (33.1%) from other races, and 972 (4.4%) from two or more races. Hispanic or Latino of any race were 14,846 persons (67.7%).

The census reported that 21,882 people (99.8% of the population) lived in households, 28 (0.1%) lived in non-institutionalized group quarters, and 20 (0.1%) were institutionalized.

There were 5,277 households, 2,797 (53.0%) had children under the age of 18 living in them, 3,415 (64.7%) were opposite-sex married couples living together, 647 (12.3%) had a female householder with no husband present, 461 (8.7%) had a male householder with no wife present. There were 335 (6.3%) unmarried opposite-sex partnerships, and 31 (0.6%) same-sex married couples or partnerships. 527 households (10.0%) were one person and 164 (3.1%) had someone living alone who was 65 or older. The average household size was 4.15. There were 4,523 families (85.7% of households); the average family size was 4.30.

The age distribution was 6,618 people (30.2%) under the age of 18, 2,722 people (12.4%) aged 18 to 24, 5,848 people (26.7%) aged 25 to 44, 5,256 people (24.0%) aged 45 to 64, and 1,486 people (6.8%) who were 65 or older. The median age was 30.4 years. For every 100 females, there were 103.3 males. For every 100 females age 18 and over, there were 105.3 males.

There were 5,640 housing units at an average density of 692.1 per square mile, of the occupied units 3,902 (73.9%) were owner-occupied and 1,375 (26.1%) were rented. The homeowner vacancy rate was 2.6%; the rental vacancy rate was 3.6%. 15,806 people (72.1% of the population) lived in owner-occupied housing units and 6,076 people (27.7%) lived in rental housing units.

=== 2000 ===
At the 2000 census there were 17,617 people, 4,556 households, and 3,863 families in the CDP. The population density was 2,733.9 inhabitants per square mile (1,055.6/km^{2}). There were 4,684 housing units at an average density of 726.9 per square mile (280.7/km^{2}). The racial makeup of the CDP was 62.7% White, 1.9% African American, 0.6% Native American, 2.2% Asian, <0.1% Pacific Islander, 28.3% from other races, and 2.3% from two or more races. Hispanic or Latino of any race were 62.1%.

Of the 4,556 households 47.6% had children under the age of 18 living with them, 67.0% were married couples living together, 11.0% had a female householder with no husband present, and 15.2% were non-families. 10.1% of households were one person and 2.8% were one person aged 65 or older. The average household size was 3.84 and the average family size was 4.05.

The age distribution was 34.0% under the age of 18, 10.3% from 18 to 24, 28.9% from 25 to 44, 21.1% from 45 to 64, and 5.7% 65 or older. The median age was 30 years. For every 100 females, there were 105.3 males. For every 100 females age 18 and over, there were 105.6 males.

The median household income was $67,530 and the median family income was $68,834. Males had a median income of $33,356 versus $25,275 for females. The per capita income for the CDP was $20,655. About 9.5% of families and 14.0% of the population were below the poverty line, including 17.7% of those under age 18 and 13.2% of those age 65 or over.

== Government ==
In the California State Legislature, Mira Loma is in the 31st senatorial district, represented by Democrat Sabrina Cervantes, and in the 58th Assembly district, represented by Republican Leticia Castillo.

In the United States House of Representatives, Mira Loma is in California's 39th congressional district, represented by Democrat Mark Takano.

== See also ==
- Wineville Chicken Coop Murders
