= Sunnyslope, California =

Sunnyslope
- Neighborhood of Jurupa Valley; Former census-designated place
- Location in Riverside County and the state of California

- Location in the United States
- Coordinates: 34°01′14″N 117°25′24″W
- Country: United States
- State: California
- County: Riverside
- Inc. into Jurupa Valley: July 1, 2011

Area
  - Total: 1.474 sq mi (3.817 km^{2})
  - Land: 1.474 sq mi (3.817 km^{2})
  - Water: 0 sq mi (0 km^{2}) 0%
- Elevation: 902 ft (275 m)

Population (2010)
  - Total: 5,153
  - Density: 3,497/sq mi (1,350/km^{2})
- Time zone: UTC-8 (PST)
  - Summer (DST): UTC-7 (PDT)
- ZIP code: 92509
- Area code: 951
- FIPS code: 06-76022
- GNIS feature ID: 1656638

Sunnyslope was a census-designated place (CDP) in Riverside County, California, United States. The population was 5,153 at the 2010 census, up from 4,437 at the 2000 census. On July 1, 2011, the CDP became part of the City of Jurupa Valley.

== Geography ==
Sunnyslope is located at 34°1′14″N 117°25′24″W (34.020613, -117.423352).

According to the United States Census Bureau, the CDP has a total area of 1.5 square miles (3.8 km^{2}), all of it land.

== Incorporation into the City of Jurupa Valley ==
On March 8, 2011, voters passed Measure A by a 54.03% YES vote, incorporating the areas of Mira Loma, Pedley, Rubidoux, Glen Avon, and Sunnyslope into the new city Jurupa Valley. The effective date of incorporation was July 1, 2011.

== Demographics ==
Historical population
Census	Pop.	Note	%±
1990	3,766		—
2000	4,437		17.8%
2010	5,153		16.1%
U.S. Decennial Census; 1850–1870 1880-1890; 1900 1910 1920; 1930 1940 1950; 1960 1970 1980; 1990 2000 2010

Sunnyslope first appeared as a census designated place in the 1990 U.S. Census. The CDP was incorporated into the city of Jurupa Valley in 2011.

=== 2010 ===
The 2010 United States census reported that Sunnyslope had a population of 5,153. The population density was 3,497.0 inhabitants per square mile (1,350.2/km^{2}). The racial makeup of Sunnyslope was 3,017 (58.5%) White, 96 (1.9%) African American, 55 (1.1%) Native American, 76 (1.5%) Asian, 10 (0.2%) Pacific Islander, 1,696 (32.9%) from other races, and 203 (3.9%) from two or more races. Hispanic or Latino of any race were 3,630 persons (70.4%).

The Census reported that 5,017 people (97.4% of the population) lived in households, 7 (0.1%) lived in non-institutionalized group quarters, and 129 (2.5%) were institutionalized.

There were 1,185 households, out of which 660 (55.7%) had children under the age of 18 living in them, 797 (67.3%) were opposite-sex married couples living together, 137 (11.6%) had a female householder with no husband present, 102 (8.6%) had a male householder with no wife present. There were 75 (6.3%) unmarried opposite-sex partnerships, and 9 (0.8%) same-sex married couples or partnerships. 102 households (8.6%) were made up of individuals, and 35 (3.0%) had someone living alone who was 65 years of age or older. The average household size was 4.23. There were 1,036 families (87.4% of all households); the average family size was 4.41.

The population was spread out, with 1,574 people (30.5%) under the age of 18, 613 people (11.9%) aged 18 to 24, 1,325 people (25.7%) aged 25 to 44, 1,228 people (23.8%) aged 45 to 64, and 413 people (8.0%) who were 65 years of age or older. The median age was 31.1 years. For every 100 females, there were 102.2 males. For every 100 females age 18 and over, there were 101.1 males.

There were 1,242 housing units at an average density of 842.9 per square mile (325.4/km^{2}), of which 959 (80.9%) were owner-occupied, and 226 (19.1%) were occupied by renters. The homeowner vacancy rate was 2.4%; the rental vacancy rate was 3.4%. 3,975 people (77.1% of the population) lived in owner-occupied housing units and 1,042 people (20.2%) lived in rental housing units.

=== 2000 ===
As of the census of 2000, there were 4,437 people, 1,086 households, and 963 families residing in the CDP. The population density was 3,216.9 inhabitants per square mile (1,242.1/km^{2}). There were 1,123 housing units at an average density of 814.2 per square mile (314.4/km^{2}). The racial makeup of the CDP was 57.7% White, 3.9% African American, 1.6% Native American, 2.3% Asian, 0.1% Pacific Islander, 30.6% from other races, and 3.9% from two or more races. Hispanic or Latino of any race were 53.1% of the population.

There were 1,086 households, out of which 51.8% had children under the age of 18 living with them, 71.1% were married couples living together, 11.3% had a female householder with no husband present, and 11.3% were non-families. 8.0% of all households were made up of individuals, and 1.9% had someone living alone who was 65 years of age or older. The average household size was 4.0 and the average family size was 4.1.

In the CDP the population was spread out, with 34.4% under the age of 18, 9.3% from 18 to 24, 28.2% from 25 to 44, 20.1% from 45 to 64, and 8.0% who were 65 years of age or older. The median age was 31 years. For every 100 females, there were 99.4 males. For every 100 females age 18 and over, there were 99.0 males.

The median income for a household in the CDP was $50,208, and the median income for a family was $48,036. Males had a median income of $35,875 versus $26,250 for females. The per capita income for the CDP was $14,055. About 15.7% of families and 18.7% of the population were below the poverty line, including 25.7% of those under age 18 and 9.2% of those age 65 or over.

== Government ==
In the California State Legislature, Sunnyslope is in the 31st senatorial district, represented by Democrat Sabrina Cervantes, and in the 58th Assembly district, represented by Republican Leticia Castillo.

In the United States House of Representatives, Sunnyslope is in California's 39th congressional district, represented by Democrat Mark Takano.
