= Belltown, California =

Belltown
- Neighborhood of Jurupa Valley
- Location in California Belltown (the United States)
- Coordinates: 34°00′42″N 117°23′00″W
- Country: United States
- State: California
- County: Riverside County
- Elevation: 840 ft (256 m)

Belltown is a neighborhood of Jurupa Valley, California within the County of Riverside. It was originally known as West Riverside, but their need for a separate identity to the nearby large city of Riverside, they voted to rename their town. It was an unincorporated community, until July 1, 2011, when it became part of the newly incorporated city of Jurupa Valley. It lies at an elevation of 840 feet (256 m).

Belltown is located on the west bank of the Santa Ana River, across from the city of Riverside. It was founded in 1907 by N.G. Bell.

== Government ==
In the California State Legislature, Belltown is in the 31st senatorial district, represented by Democrat Sabrina Cervantes, and in the 60th Assembly district, represented by Democrat Corey Jackson.

In the United States House of Representatives, Belltown is in California's 41st congressional district, represented by Republican Ken Calvert. California is represented in the United States Senate by Democrats Dianne Feinstein and Kamala Harris.
