= Pedley, California =

Pedley
- Neighborhood of Jurupa Valley; Former census-designated place
- Location in Riverside County and the state of California

- Location in the United States
- Coordinates: 33°58′31″N 117°28′33″W
- Country: United States
- State: California
- County: Riverside
- Inc. into Jurupa Valley: July 1, 2011

Area
  - Total: 5.116 sq mi (13.250 km^{2})
  - Land: 5.079 sq mi (13.155 km^{2})
  - Water: 0.037 sq mi (0.096 km^{2}) 0.72%
- Elevation: 720 ft (220 m)

Population (2010)
  - Total: 12,672
  - Density: 2,494.9/sq mi (963.28/km^{2})
- Time zone: UTC-8 (PST)
  - Summer (DST): UTC-7 (PDT)
- ZIP code: 92509
- Area code: 951
- FIPS code: 06-56350
- GNIS feature ID: 1661208

Pedley was a census-designated place (CDP) in Riverside County, California, United States. The population was 12,672 at the 2010 census, up from 11,207 at the 2000 census. On July 1, 2011, the CDP became part of the City of Jurupa Valley.

== History ==
Pedley took its name from William Pedley, a former English cricketer who became manager of the San Jacinto Land Company at Riverside, California. He was the designer, builder, and engineer of the irrigation system that was installed there. The settlement was named in 1903 or 1904 when the San Pedro, Los Angeles and Salt Lake Railroad (SP&LASL), which is now the Union Pacific Railroad Company (UPRR), installed a switch and a railroad station at the location. The concrete viaduct train bridge that crosses the Santa Ana River was at one time the longest concrete railroad bridge in the United States. On the northern edge of Pedley at Jurupa Ave C/O Van Buren is the Bly Wye. The wye serves as a juncture to the Crestmore Cement Mill and was once the connection to the Pacific Electric to downtown Riverside and Rialto. The Bly Wye also led to the rock quarry at the end of Jurupa Ave. The rock quarry provided rock for San Pedro Harbor and the rock jetties.

=== Incorporation into the City of Jurupa Valley ===
On March 8, 2011, voters passed Measure A by a 54.03% YES vote, incorporating the areas of Mira Loma, Pedley, Rubidoux, Glen Avon, and Sunnyslope into a new city, Jurupa Valley. The effective date of incorporation was July 1, 2011.

== Demographics ==
=== 2010 ===
The 2010 United States census reported that Pedley had a population of 12,672. The population density was 2,477.0 inhabitants per square mile (956.4/km^{2}). The racial makeup of Pedley was 7,509 (59.3%) White, 381 (3.0%) African American, 119 (0.9%) Native American, 554 (4.4%) Asian, 48 (0.4%) Pacific Islander, 3,520 (27.8%) from other races, and 541 (4.3%) from two or more races. Hispanic or Latino of any race were 6,773 persons (53.4%).

The Census reported that 12,502 people (98.7% of the population) lived in households, 17 (0.1%) lived in non-institutionalized group quarters, and 153 (1.2%) were institutionalized.

There were 3,451 households, out of which 1,615 (46.8%) had children under the age of 18 living in them, 2,106 (61.0%) were opposite-sex married couples living together, 438 (12.7%) had a female householder with no husband present, 260 (7.5%) had a male householder with no wife present. There were 236 (6.8%) unmarried opposite-sex partnerships, and 27 (0.8%) same-sex married couples or partnerships. 460 households (13.3%) were made up of individuals, and 201 (5.8%) had someone living alone who was 65 years of age or older. The average household size was 3.62. There were 2,804 families (81.3% of all households); the average family size was 3.89.

The population was spread out, with 3,511 people (27.7%) under the age of 18, 1,450 people (11.4%) aged 18 to 24, 3,268 people (25.8%) aged 25 to 44, 3,171 people (25.0%) aged 45 to 64, and 1,272 people (10.0%) who were 65 years of age or older. The median age was 33.4 years. For every 100 females, there were 101.2 males. For every 100 females age 18 and over, there were 99.8 males.

There were 3,663 housing units at an average density of 716.0 per square mile (276.4/km^{2}), of which 2,609 (75.6%) were owner-occupied, and 842 (24.4%) were occupied by renters. The homeowner vacancy rate was 1.8%; the rental vacancy rate was 7.5%. 9,229 people (72.8% of the population) lived in owner-occupied housing units and 3,273 people (25.8%) lived in rental housing units.

=== 2000 ===
As of the census of 2000, there were 11,207 people, 3,180 households, and 2,636 families residing in the CDP. The population density was 2,204.7 inhabitants per square mile (851.2/km^{2}). There were 3,289 housing units at an average density of 647.0 per square mile (249.8/km^{2}). The racial makeup of the CDP was 66.9% White, 4.6% African American, 0.9% Native American, 3.7% Asian, 0.2% Pacific Islander, 18.4% from other races, and 5.2% from two or more races. Hispanic or Latino of any race were 34.3% of the population.

There were 3,180 households, out of which 47.7% had children under the age of 18 living with them, 63.9% were married couples living together, 11.9% had a female householder with no husband present, and 17.1% were non-families. 12.4% of all households were made up of individuals, and 5.0% had someone living alone who was 65 years of age or older. The average household size was 3.5 and the average family size was 3.8.

In the CDP the population was spread out, with 33.0% under the age of 18, 9.0% from 18 to 24, 29.5% from 25 to 44, 21.3% from 45 to 64, and 7.2% who were 65 years of age or older. The median age was 32 years. For every 100 females, there were 102.4 males. For every 100 females age 18 and over, there were 97.1 males.

The median income for a household in the CDP was $60,567, and the median income for a family was $63,239. Males had a median income of $40,227 versus $26,508 for females. The per capita income for the CDP was $20,623. About 4.7% of families and 8.7% of the population were below the poverty line, including 11.4% of those under age 18 and 7.8% of those age 65 or over.

== Emergency services ==
The Riverside County Fire Department through a cooperative agreement with CAL FIRE provides fire and paramedic services to Pedley.

In Law enforcement, Pedley and the entire Jurupa Valley (i.e. Mira Loma and Glen Avon) is served by the Riverside County Sheriff's Department office based in Rubidoux.

== Government ==
In the California State Legislature, Pedley is in the 31st senatorial district, represented by Democrat Sabrina Cervantes, and in the 58th Assembly district, represented by Republican Leticia Castillo.

In the United States House of Representatives, Pedley is in California's 39th congressional district, represented by Democrat Mark Takano.
