= Rubidoux, California =

Rubidoux
- Neighborhood of Jurupa Valley; Former census-designated place
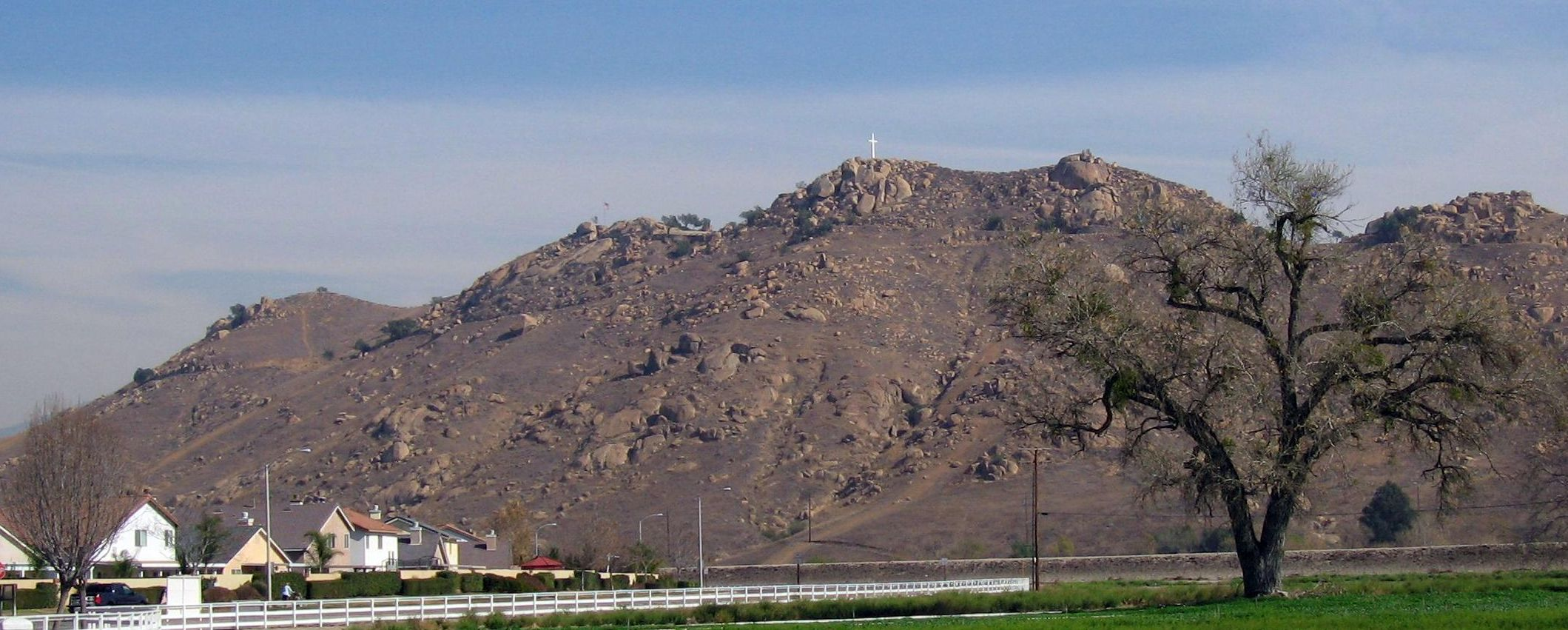
- Mount Rubidoux, named after Louis Robidoux

- Location in Riverside County and the state of California

- Location in the United States
- Coordinates: 33°59′45″N 117°25′6″W
- Country: United States
- State: California
- County: Riverside
- Incorporated into Jurupa Valley: July 1, 2011

Area
  - Total: 9.945 sq mi (25.757 km^{2})
  - Land: 9.659 sq mi (25.017 km^{2})
  - Water: 0.286 sq mi (0.740 km^{2}) 2.87%
- Elevation: 774 ft (236 m)

Population (2010)
  - Total: 34,280
  - Density: 3,549/sq mi (1,370/km^{2})
- Time zone: UTC-8 (PST)
  - Summer (DST): UTC-7 (PDT)
- ZIP code: 92509
- Area code: 951
- FIPS code: 06-63260
- GNIS feature ID: 1661345

Rubidoux (/ˈruːbɪdoʊ/ ROO-bid-oh) was a census-designated place and unincorporated community in Riverside County, California, until July 1, 2011, when it became a neighborhood of the newly formed city of Jurupa Valley. The city is located within Southern California's Inland Empire region, which is part of the Greater Los Angeles Area. Along with the rest of Jurupa Valley, Rubidoux has transformed from a rural area of quarries and dairy farms, in mid to late 20th century, to a suburb of the two larger regions. As of the 2010 census, the population was 34,280, up from 29,180 at the 2000 census.

The Rubidoux neighborhood is immediately west of the city of Riverside, separated by the Santa Ana River, and Mount Rubidoux, a prominent landmark for the area, and a Riverside city park.

Key transportation elements of Rubidoux are the Flabob Airport (IATA: RIR, ICAO: KRIR, FAA LID: RIR), with a 3,200-foot (980 m) runway, and California State Route 60.

== Geography ==
Rubidoux was located at 33°59′45″N 117°25′6″W. According to the United States Census Bureau, the CDP had a total area of 9.9 square miles (25.6 km^{2}), of which 9.7 square miles (25.1 km^{2}) was land and 0.3 square miles (0.8 km^{2}) (2.87%) was water.

== History ==
The community's name refers to Louis Robidoux who settled in the area in 1843. Of French Canadian origin, Robidoux's grandfather migrated from Quebec to St. Louis, Missouri, where his interest in the fur trade expanded to become the family business. Robidoux and his brothers became US citizens after 1803 when St. Louis officially became part of the United States. Robidoux was also a naturalized Mexican citizen who had served as Alcalde of Santa Fe, New Mexico. The town of Rubidoux is sited on part of what was once Rancho Jurupa, the Robidoux family ranch. Current descendants of Robidoux now spell their surname Rubidoux.

=== Incorporation into the City of Jurupa Valley ===
On March 8, 2011, voters of Rubidoux and adjoining towns passed Measure A by a 54% "Yes" vote, to incorporate the areas of Mira Loma, Pedley, Rubidoux, Glen Avon, and Sunnyslope into the new city of Jurupa Valley. The effective date of incorporation was July 1, 2011.

== Demographics ==
Rubidoux
Population by year

2010 34,280
2000 29,180
1990 24,367
1980 16,763
1970 13,969
1960 not returned
1950 3,798 (Z)

(Z): Area returned as West Riverside

=== 2010 ===
At the 2010 census Rubidoux had a population of 34,280. The population density was 3,447.0 inhabitants per square mile (1,330.9/km^{2}). The racial makeup of Rubidoux was 16,935 (49.4%) White, 1,850 (5.4%) African American, 391 (1.1%) Native American, 855 (2.5%) Asian, 136 (0.4%) Pacific Islander, 12,469 (36.4%) from other races, and 1,644 (4.8%) from two or more races. Hispanic or Latino of any race were 23,322 persons (68.0%).

The census reported that 33,958 people (99.1% of the population) lived in households, 106 (0.3%) lived in non-institutionalized group quarters, and 216 (0.6%) were institutionalized.

There were 8,931 households, 4,730 (53.0%) had children under the age of 18 living in them, 5,043 (56.5%) were opposite-sex married couples living together, 1,459 (16.3%) had a female householder with no husband present, 762 (8.5%) had a male householder with no wife present. There were 651 (7.3%) unmarried opposite-sex partnerships, and 61 (0.7%) same-sex married couples or partnerships. 1,261 households (14.1%) were one person and 473 (5.3%) had someone living alone who was 65 or older. The average household size was 3.80. There were 7,264 families (81.3% of households); the average family size was 4.13.

The age distribution was 10,997 people (32.1%) under the age of 18, 4,038 people (11.8%) aged 18 to 24, 9,304 people (27.1%) aged 25 to 44, 7,367 people (21.5%) aged 45 to 64, and 2,574 people (7.5%) who were 65 or older. The median age was 29.2 years. For every 100 females, there were 100.4 males. For every 100 females age 18 and over, there were 98.1 males.

There were 9,518 housing units at an average density of 957.1 per square mile, of the occupied units 5,834 (65.3%) were owner-occupied and 3,097 (34.7%) were rented. The homeowner vacancy rate was 2.8%; the rental vacancy rate was 6.5%. 22,079 people (64.4% of the population) lived in owner-occupied housing units and 11,879 people (34.7%) lived in rental housing units.

=== 2000 ===
At the 2000 census there were 29,180 people, 7,991 households, and 6,464 families in the CDP. The population density was 3,186.5 inhabitants per square mile (1,230.3/km^{2}). There were 8,497 housing units at an average density of 927.9 per square mile (358.3/km^{2}). The racial makeup of the CDP was 51.8% White, 7.3% African American, 1.4% Native American, 2.2% Asian, 0.3% Pacific Islander, 32.0% from other races, and 4.9% from two or more races. Hispanic or Latino of any race were 54.3%.

Of the 7,991 households 48.8% had children under the age of 18 living with them, 56.6% were married couples living together, 16.9% had a female householder with no husband present, and 19.1% were non-families. 14.4% of households were one person and 5.2% were one person aged 65 or older. The average household size was 3.6 and the average family size was 3.9.

The age distribution was 36.0% under the age of 18, 10.3% from 18 to 24, 29.7% from 25 to 44, 17.3% from 45 to 64, and 6.7% 65 or older. The median age was 28 years. For every 100 females, there were 101.2 males. For every 100 females age 18 and over, there were 99.1 males.

The median household income was $38,731 and the median family income was $40,019. Males had a median income of $32,252 versus $23,287 for females. The per capita income for the CDP was $13,912. About 17.2% of families and 20.8% of the population were below the poverty line, including 28.4% of those under age 18 and 8.8% of those age 65 or over.

== Government ==
In the California State Legislature, Rubidoux is in the 31st senatorial district, represented by Democrat Sabrina Cervantes, and in the 58th Assembly district, represented by Republican Leticia Castillo.

In the United States House of Representatives, Rubidoux is in California's 39th congressional district, represented by Democrat Mark Takano.
