= Quail Valley, Menifee, California =

Community in Menifee, California, United States

Quail Valley is a former census-designated place (CDP) in Riverside County, California, United States. On October 1, 2008, the community along with the neighboring communities of Sun City and Menifee incorporated as the City of Menifee.

The population when it was a CDP was 1,639 at the 2000 census.

== Geography ==
Quail Valley is located at 33°42′24″N 117°14′46″W.

According to the United States Census Bureau, the CDP has a total area of 1.2 square miles (3.2 km^{2}), all of it land.

== Demographics ==
As of the census of 2000, there were 1,639 people, 484 households, and 369 families residing when it was a CDP. The population density was 1,307.6 inhabitants per square mile (504.9/km^{2}). There were 539 housing units at an average density of 430.0 per square mile (166.0/km^{2}). The racial makeup of the CDP was 69.6% White, 1.0% African American, 2.1% Native American, 0.9% Asian, 0.5% Pacific Islander, 21.6% from other races, and 4.2% from two or more races. Hispanic or Latino of any race were 47.1% of the population.

There were 484 households, out of which 49.6% had children under the age of 18 living with them, 52.9% were married couples living together, 14.5% had a female householder with no husband present, and 23.6% were non-families. 19.2% of all households were made up of individuals, and 6.0% had someone living alone who was 65 years of age or older. The average household size was 3.39 and the average family size was 3.86.

In the CDP the population was spread out, with 37.3% under the age of 18, 9.5% from 18 to 24, 31.2% from 25 to 44, 16.5% from 45 to 64, and 5.5% who were 65 years of age or older. The median age was 27 years. For every 100 females there were 108.5 males. For every 100 females age 18 and over, there were 107.7 males.

The median income for a household in the CDP was $32,344, and the median income for a family was $35,441. Males had a median income of $30,750 versus $16,548 for females. The per capita income for the CDP was $9,751. About 18.4% of families and 20.4% of the population were below the poverty line, including 23.8% of those under age 18 and 25.8% of those age 65 or over.

== Politics ==
In the state legislature Quail Valley is located in the 37th Senate District, represented by Republican Bill Emmerson, and in the 64th Assembly District, represented by Republican John J. Benoit. Federally, Quail Valley is located in California's 49th congressional district, which is represented by Republican Darrell Issa.
