= Leticia Castillo =

American politician (born 1971)

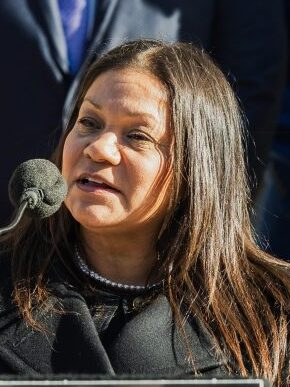
- Castillo in 2025

Member of the California State Assembly from the 58th district
- Incumbent
- Assumed office December 2, 2024
- Preceded by: Sabrina Cervantes

Personal details
- Born: April 27, 1971 (age 55) Riverside, California
- Party: Republican
- Education: Riverside City College (AA); University of Phoenix (BS); National University (MA)
- Website: Campaign Website; Legislative website

Leticia Castillo (born April 27, 1971) is an American psychotherapist and politician serving as a member of the California State Assembly. She is a Republican representing the 58th district, encompassing parts of Riverside County and San Bernardino County. The district includes the cities of Jurupa Valley, Corona, Eastvale, Riverside, and Grand Terrace. Prior to her election, she was a psychotherapist in private practice.

== Early life and education ==
Born in Riverside, California, Castillo is a first-generation Mexican American. She graduated from Lee Pollard High School, (formerly known as, Buena Vista High School) while simultaneously attending the Corona College of Cosmetology in 1989. She holds a B.S. degree in human services from the University of Phoenix, a M.A. in counseling psychology from National University, and an associate degree for social and behavioral studies at Riverside City College.

== California State Assembly ==
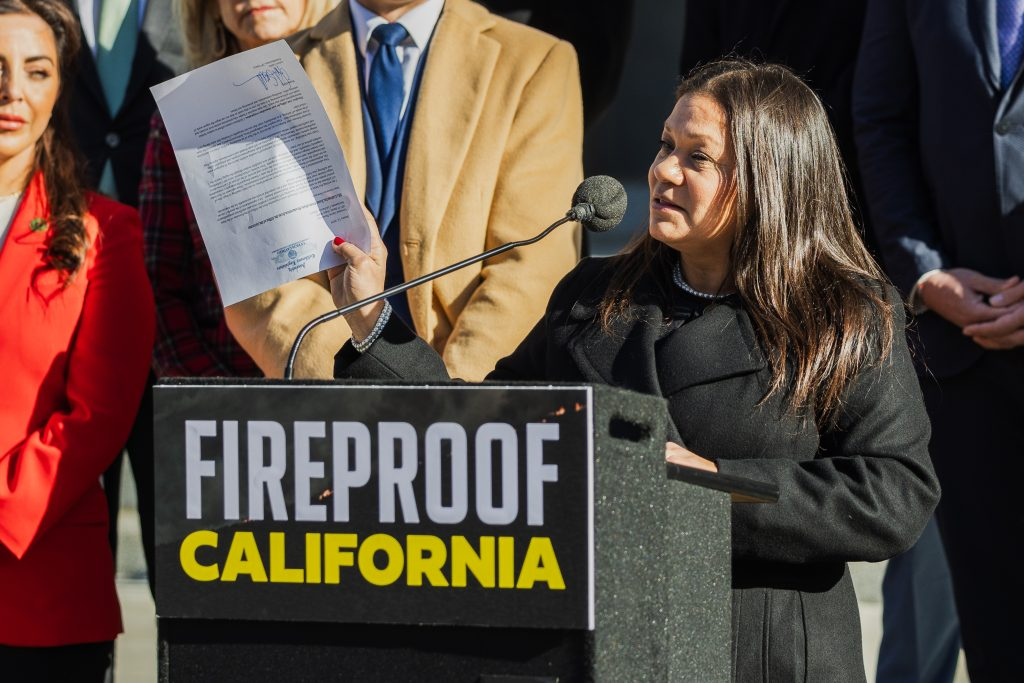
Castillo speaking at a Fireproof California press conference, 2025.

Castillo first ran for the California State Assembly in 2022, placing third in the primary and not advancing to the general election against incumbent Democrat Sabrina Cervantes.

In 2024, Castillo ran again in the open race to succeed Cervantes, who ran for California State Senate. During the open primary, Castillo ran against Democratic Riverside City Councilmembers Clarissa Cervantes, the sister of Sabrina, and Ronaldo Fierro.

After advancing to the general election, Castillo defeated Cervantes by 596 votes. Her victory was seen as a major upset in the blue-leaning district, attributed to the Latino swing towards Donald Trump in the concurrent presidential election as well as Cervantes' two arrests for driving under the influence.

=== Tenure ===
In February 2025, Castillo introduced numerous anti-trans bills and promoted the parental rights movement. One bill would state that a parent refusing to use their child's preferred pronouns, chosen name, or allowing their child to access gender-affirming health care is not an act of child abuse and would bar judges from considering whether a parent is gender-affirming in child custody cases. Another bill would require students to be excused with a parent's permission from public school curricula, assemblies, or lessons discussing "transgender concepts” and instead provide an alternative educational activity. She also introduced a bill to promote adoption as an alternative to abortion with the anti-abortion California Family Council's support.

In April, she supported an unsuccessful voter ID law which would have required proof of citizenship in order to register to vote as well as requiring a government-issued ID at polling places and the last four digits of a government ID number on an absentee ballot.

== Electoral history ==
=== 2022 ===
2022 California's 58th State Assembly district election
Primary election
Party	Candidate	Votes	%
Democratic	Sabrina Cervantes (incumbent)	28,568	54.1
Republican	Bernard William Murphy	13,449	25.5
Republican	Leticia Castillo	10,756	20.4
Total votes		52,773	100.0

=== 2024 ===
2024 California's 58th State Assembly district election
Primary election
Party	Candidate	Votes	%
Republican	Leticia Castillo	29,500	48.6
Democratic	Clarissa Cervantes	15,713	25.9
Democratic	Ronald Fierro	15,514	25.5
Total votes		60,727	100.0
General election
Republican	Leticia Castillo	78,292	50.2
Democratic	Clarissa Cervantes	77,696	49.8
Total votes		155,988	100.0
Republican gain from Democratic			
