= Robidoux =

Robidoux is a surname of French-Canadian origin. Notable people with this surname include:

- Alain Robidoux
- André Robidoux
- Billy Jo Robidoux
- David Robidoux
- Ferdinand-Joseph Robidoux
- Florent Robidoux
- Joseph Robidoux I
- Joseph Robidoux II
- Joseph Robidoux III
- Joseph Robidoux IV
- Joseph-Émery Robidoux
- Louis Rubidoux
- Manuel Robidoux
- William (Guillaume) Robidoux

== See also ==
- Mount Rubidoux
- Roubidoux Creek
- Robidoux Pass
- Robidoux Row
