= Joseph Robidoux =

Joseph Robidoux may refer to:

- Joseph Robidoux I (1701–1778), fur trader
- Joseph Robidoux II (1722–1778), fur trader
- Joseph Robidoux III (1750–1809), fur trader and merchant
- Joseph Robidoux IV (1783–1868), founder of St. Joseph, Missouri
