= No Heart =

No Heart may refer to:

- No Heart (chief) (active 1830s–1850s), Iowa leader
- "No Heart" (song), a 2016 song by 21 Savage and Metro Boomin
- No Heart Creek, South Dakota
- No Heart, a Care Bears villain
