= No Heart Creek =

Stream in South Dakota, U.S.

Coordinates: 44°51′28″N 100°38′21″W

No Heart Creek is a stream in the U.S. state of South Dakota. It takes its name from a Sioux named No Heart (no relation to No Heart, chief of the Iowa people in the 1850s).

== See also ==
- List of rivers of South Dakota
