= Jeffrey Deroine =

American diplomat

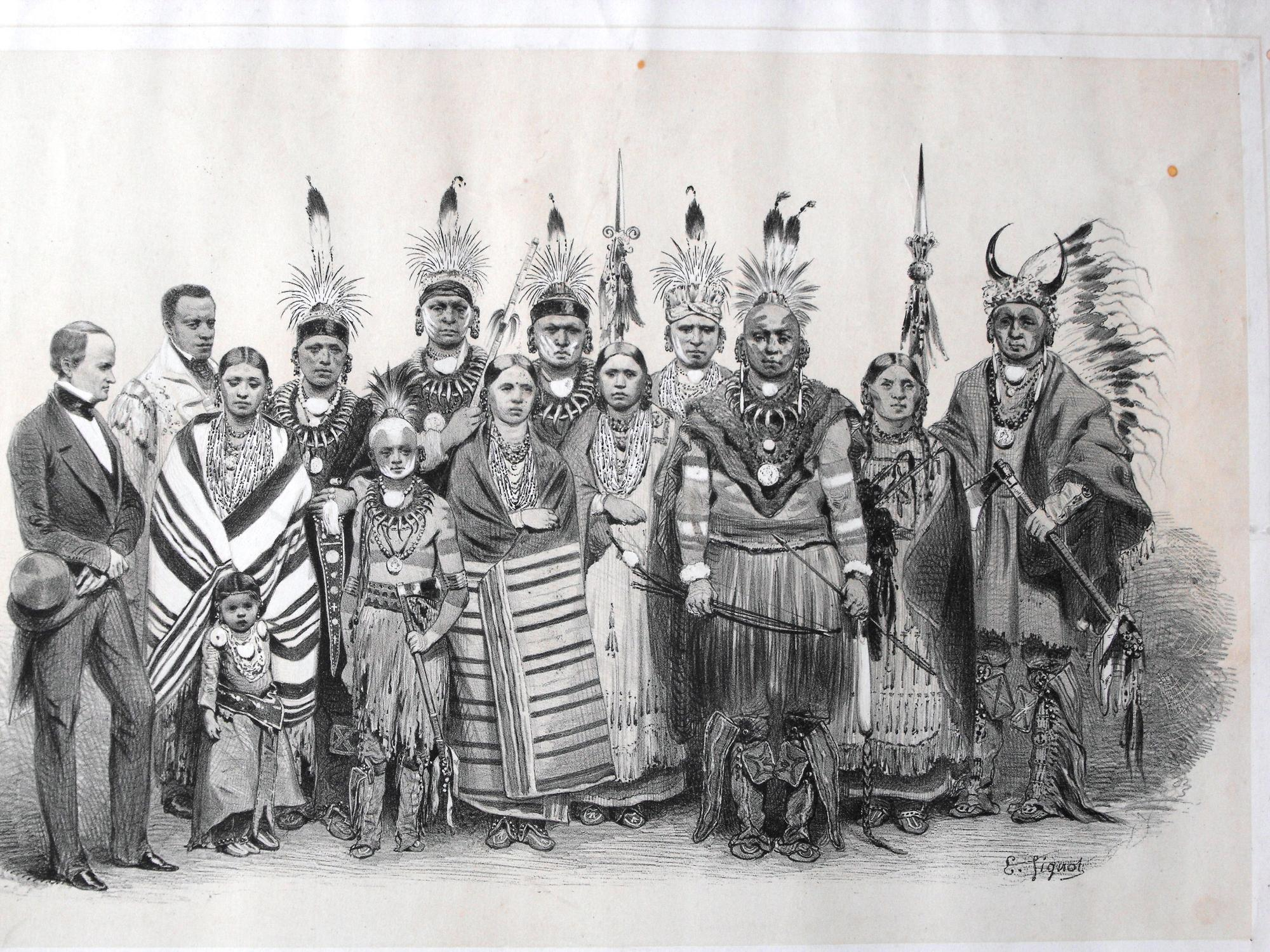
Boston artist John Henry Bufford made this lithograph in 1845 after the Ioways returned from a year in Europe. Deroine is second from the left next to George Melody. Ioway chief Francis White Cloud is front center left.

Jeffrey Deroine ("de-ro-NAY", alt. Dorian, Deroin, Doraway; May 14, 1806 – 28 March 1859) was an African American diplomat, trader, and linguist who helped the U.S. Government negotiate numerous treaties with Native American tribes in the Midwest and West.

== Fur trade origins ==
Deroine, the son of French trader Amable Derouin and Marie Louise Camp, an enslaved African American woman, was born in St. Louis. He was enslaved by his Uncle François Derouin, who owned Deroine's mother. After Derouin freed Jeffrey in 1820, he was captured and enslaved once again by the French-American fur trader Joseph Robidoux. Working for Robidoux at his American Fur Company trading posts, Deroine became an experienced trader himself, helped by his ease in learning different American Indian languages. Suffering from Robidoux's physical abuse, Deroine sued for his freedom in St. Louis in 1822, when Deroine was 16 years old, claiming he was being held against his will in regions where slavery was illegal. After a decade of legal proceedings and delays, Deroine lost his case, but his freedom was likely purchased by either the Indian trader Andrew S. Hughes or the Ioway chief Francis White Cloud in 1832.

== Diplomat ==
Deroine, now free, began work for Hughes as a translator at the Ioway Agency, located near Agency, Missouri, in delicate negotiations between the Ioway and Omaha. His reputation for his linguistic skills led to Deroin's employment as translator for the Office of Indian Affairs, although his hiring required the intervention of William Clark because of his status as a former slave. Deroine mostly translated for the Ioway, and was accepted by the Ioway as an ally.

In 1844 he accompanied Francis White Cloud and a group of Ioway on a tour of Europe sponsored by George Catlin (who called him "Doraway") which was widely celebrated at the time.

His interpretation of their languages was so clear and intelligent that he not only made a favorable impression upon all the dignitaries of the foreign courts at which they were received, but, it is said, fascinated a lady of high title -- Disraeli had frequent conversations with him and showed him marked attention ... He spoke French as fluently as he did English, or a dozen Indian tongues with which he was familiar. He was a fine looking man, with a benevolent intelligent countenance, stout figure, modest and respectful demeanor, and was an honest and faithful man.

Soon after his return, he was banned from the Indian Agency allegedly because of alcohol trading, but likely his dismissal resulted because he was considered too close to White Cloud. After leaving the government, Deroine became a prosperous farmer at St. Joseph, Missouri, owning "several thousand dollars worth of property" at the time of his death. In 1848, as in years earlier, Deroine served as the federal government's interpreter for negotiations with several tribal nations. He lived for almost a year at Fort Kearny in the Nebraska Territory in negotiations with the Sac and Fox Nation.

Until he died, he annually collected $50 from the government, a pension negotiated by White Cloud and other grateful Ioway.

== Personal ==
Deroine was perhaps married three times. He reportedly married the mixed-blood daughter of the trader Gabriel Vasques by 1834, other sources report he was married to a different woman named Su-See Baskette by 1837. Late in life, he purchased his final wife out of slavery from "Dr. Brown" of Kentucky; they had several children.
