= James White Cloud =

Chief of the Iowa tribe (1840–1940)

- The-gro-wo-nung
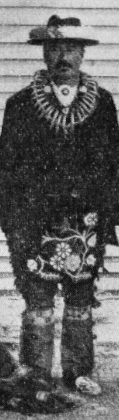

Iowa people leader

Personal details
- Born: May 15, 1840 near Highland, Kansas
- Died: July 16, 1940 (aged 100) near White Cloud, Kansas
- Spouse: Wy-to-hum-gra-mee (m. 1867; died 1914) Lydia Dorian (m. 1874; div. 1875) Sallie Dorian (m. 1875; div. 1883) Josie Dorian (m. 1884; div. 1885)
- Children: 6
- Parent(s): Francis White Cloud; Mary Many Days Robidoux

James White Cloud (Iowa-Oto: The-gro-wo-nung; May 15, 1840 – July 16, 1940) was Chief of the Iowa people from 1865 until his death in 1940.

== Early life and family ==
He was born May 15, 1840, just east of Highland, Kansas, son of Francis White Cloud and Mary Many Days Robidoux. His Ioway name was The-gro-wo-nung. On the paternal side, he was grandson of Mahaska, for whom White Cloud, Kansas, is named. On the maternal side, he was grandson of Joseph Robidoux IV, founder of St. Joseph, Missouri and his second wife, whose name is unknown. His parents founded one of the main families of Métis people who played a major role in the 19th century fur trade in Missouri and Kansas. Another prominent Métis family, that of Joseph Dorian, was likely related to two of James' wives. His father was killed in 1859 in a skirmish with the Pawnee.

White Cloud attended mission school at Highland, Kansas, and served as a Scout for Company C, 14th Regiment Kansas Volunteer Cavalry of the Union Army in the American Civil War. He saw action when the Union repelled William Quantrill's raid at Lawrence, known as the Lawrence massacre.

== As chief ==
He served as Chief of the Ioway Indian Nation from 1865 until his death in 1940.

On February 28, 1867, James married a full-blooded Ioway named Pumpkin Vine (Wy-to-hum-gra-mee), later known as Grandma Louise White Cloud. She lived from 1848 to 1914 and was the daughter of Sho-tom-he and his wife Daw-ya-ma-mee. Of their two sons, only Lewis White Cloud grew to maturity.

Ioway custom allowed as many wives as a man could afford and, in 1874, while still married to Pumpkin Vine, James married Lydia Dorian, an Ioway woman. James and his two wives lived in the same house. James and Lydia divorced in 1875. James' third marriage was in 1875 to Sallie Dorian of the Sac and Fox Nation. They had two children, Emma Little Crow and Joseph White Cloud, and they divorced in 1883. His fourth wife was Josie Dorian, an Ioway. They married in 1884 and divorced in 1885.

James received 160 acres of land in northeast Brown County on the Ioway Reservation, 100 acres of which was in cultivation. The farm had a three-room house, with outbuildings, a well, and a bark mill, the only one on the reservation.

James died on July 16, 1940, near White Cloud, Kansas. He and his granddaughter Louise White Cloud were buried in Tesson Cemetery in Brown County. The Tesson Cemetery was named for Joseph Tesson, of the Sac and Fox Nation, who was the brother-in law of James White Cloud, having married two of his sisters.

After his death in 1940, his great-grandson, Jimmy Rhodd (1935–1997; alt. James Mahaska Rhodd), became chief of the Iowa Tribe of Kansas and Nebraska.

== Sources ==
- James White Cloud, Ioway Cultural Institute
- Nuzum, George, Biography of Iowa Indians of Kansas and Nebraska from 1880, Kansas Historical Society, 1906
