= Mary Many Days Robidoux =

Mary Many Days Robidoux (c. 1805-29 June 1884) was the daughter of Joseph Robidoux and his second wife, a woman whose name is Juna.

Mary was the first generation of one of the main families of what is referred to as the Métis people, the offspring of European men who married Native American women. The Métis played a major role in the 19th century fur trade in Missouri and Kansas. Another prominent Métis family was that of Joseph Dorian who likely was related to two of Mary's daughters-in-law.

According to Thorne: "Here in 1805 Joseph Robidoux fathered a child, Mary, by an Indian woman. This daughter would marry Chief White Cloud of the Ioway, producing a chiefly line among that tribe. ... The kinship networks established between St. Louis independent traders and ranking native families in the years between 1800 and 1825 consolidated authority among the clan leaders linked to trader interests. Joseph Robidoux's French-Ioway daughter, Mary (Many Days), married Ioway chief White Cloud."

Mary married Chief Francis White Cloud some time before 1840. They had at least four children:

- James White Cloud, an Ioway chief
- Jefferson White Cloud, an Ioway chief
- Two daughters, both of which married Joseph Tesson.

Mary apparently married a second time to Francis H. Dupuis. She died on the Ioway Reservation on 29 June 1884.

== Sources ==
- Blaine, Martha Royce, The Ioway Indians. Norman, Oklahoma: University of Oklahoma Press, 1979
- Lewis, Hugh M., Robidoux Chronicicles, French-Indian Etnoculture of the Trans-Mississippi West, Trafford, Canada, 2004
- Genealogical Dictionary of Canadian Families, 1608-1890, Tanguay Collection
- Nuzum, George, Biography of Iowa Indians of Kansas and Nebraska from 1880, Kansas Historical Society, 1906
