= USS Mahaska (1861) =

Gunboat of the United States Navy

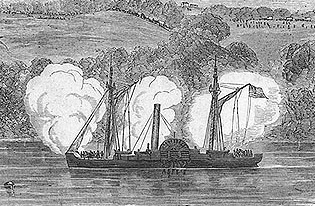
- USS Mahaska shelling the Rebels at Harrison's Landing, 1 July 1862

History

United States
- Name: USS Mahaska
- Namesake: Chief Mahaska
- Builder: Portsmouth Navy Yard, Kittery, Maine
- Cost: $130,001.68
- Launched: 10 December 1861
- Commissioned: 5 May 1862
- Decommissioned: 12 September 1868
- Fate: Sold, 20 November 1868

General characteristics
- Type: Sidewheel steamer
- Displacement: 1,070 long tons (1,087 t)
- Length: 228 ft 2 in (69.55 m)
- Beam: 33 ft 10 in (10.31 m)
- Draft: 10 ft 4 in (3.15 m)
- Propulsion: Steam engine
- Speed: 9 knots (17 km/h; 10 mph)
- Armament: 1 × 100-pounder Parrott rifle; 1 × 9 in (230 mm) gun; 4 × 24-pounder guns

The first USS Mahaska was a wooden, double-ender, sidewheel steamer of the third rate in the United States Navy during the American Civil War. She was named for Ioway Chief Mahaska.

Mahaska was built at the Portsmouth Navy Yard, Kittery, Maine, for $130,001.68; launched 10 December 1861 and commissioned 5 May 1862, Lt. Norman H. Farquhar in command.

Mahaska sailed from Portsmouth 15 May 1862, reporting shortly thereafter for duty in the rivers flowing into the Chesapeake Bay. On 20 June she engaged the Confederate batteries along the Appomattox River and on 1 November destroyed entrenchments at West Point, Virginia. Continuing her patrols into the next year, she captured the schooner General Taylor in the Chesapeake Bay 20 February 1863. Moving south later in the year, she joined in the blockade of Charleston and participated in the attacks on the forts and batteries in that harbor: Fort Wagner, 8 and 18 August; Morris Island, 13 to 17, and 20 August; and Fort Sumter, 21 August 1863. The following year she took part in the joint expedition against Jacksonville, Florida, 5 February to 4 April, remaining on picket and patrol duty in the St. Johns River until 16 August when she returned to Charleston, South Carolina. She then steamed north to Boston, Massachusetts for overhaul.

Overhaul completed 16 January 1865, Mahaska returned to Florida waters, capturing the schooner Delia, near Bayport, 17 February. After the end of the Civil War, the steamer continued to cruise in southern waters until decommissioned at New Orleans, Louisiana on 12 September 1868. She was sold 20 November 1868 to John Dole of Boston.
