= Pachappa Hill =

Summit in the state of California

Coordinates: 33°57′38″N 117°22′49″W

Pachappa Hill is a summit in the Temescal Mountains within the city of Riverside in Riverside County, California. It is a hill that rises to an elevation of 1,175 feet (358 meters).

== History ==
Riverside historians have proposed that the original seven square league (approximately 31,000 acres (125 km^{2})) Rancho Jurupa land grant was significantly smaller than the area eventually recognized by the United States. They argue that Pachappa Hill, the southeast marker of the Rancho Jurupa, was originally the name of another hill, today known as Mount Rubidoux, and that one of the early owners of Rancho Jurupa reassigned the name Pachappa to the current day Pachappa Hill in order to expand the property of the Rancho.

== See also ==
- Mount Rubidoux
- Rancho Jurupa
