= Rancho Jurupa =

Mexican land grant in Californio (1838)

Coordinates: 34.000°N 117.340°W

- Jurupa Ranch
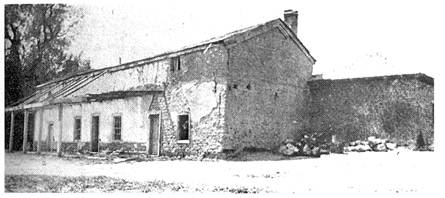
- Louis Rubidoux Home in 1897

- Location within California
- Type: Mexican land grant (rancho)
- Etymology: Named for Jurupa
- Location: Riverside County and San Bernardino County, California, United States
- Nearest city: Riverside, California

History
- Granted: 1838
- Founded: 1838
- Founder: Juan Bandini
- Original use: Cattle ranch (Mexican land grant)

Site notes
- Area: 40,569-acre (164.18 km^{2})
- Current use: Subdivided into modern cities including Jurupa Valley and Riverside

Rancho Jurupa was a 40,569-acre (164.18 km^{2}) Mexican land grant in California, United States, that is divided by the present-day counties of Riverside and San Bernardino. The land was granted to Juan Bandini by Governor Juan B. Alvarado in 1838. Located along both banks of the Santa Ana River in southern California, the rancho included much of the land in the present day city of Jurupa Valley, as well as the downtown area in the city of Riverside.

== History ==
Rancho Jurupa was established on the homelands of the Tongva, and included the village of Horuuvngna within its boundaries.

"Seven leagues of grazing land: a little more," is how the "then almost worthless, but now invaluable," tract known as Jurupa Ranch came into being on September 28, 1838, through a grant made from Juan B. Alvarado (then Governor of California) to Juan Bandini (1800–1859).

Riverside historians, have proposed that the original seven square league (approximately 31,000 acres (125 km^{2})) Rancho Jurupa land grant was significantly smaller than the area eventually recognized by the United States. They argue that Pachappa hill, the southeast marker of the Rancho Jurupa, was originally the name of another hill, today known as Mount Rubidoux, and that one of the early owners of Rancho Jurupa reassigned the name Pachappa to the current day Pachappa Hill in order to expand the property of the Rancho.

== Rancho Jurupa (Stearns) ==
In 1841 Abel Stearns (1798–1871) married Bandini's daughter Arcadia. With the cession of California to the United States following the Mexican–American War, the 1848 Treaty of Guadalupe Hidalgo provided that the land grants would be honored. As required by the Land Act of 1851, Juan Bandini filed a claim for the major portion of the grant in 1852, and was confirmed by the US District Court in 1855. In 1857 Juan Bandini sold this portion of the grant to his son-in-law, Abel Stearns. Stearns received a US land patent for this 33,819-acre (136.86 km^{2}) portion of the original Rancho Jurupa grant in 1879. The Stearns Ranchos subdivided a portion of Rancho Jurupa into the community of West Riverside, now known as Rubidoux.

== Rancho Jurupa (Rubidoux) ==
In 1843, Bandini sold approximately 1½ square leagues (6,750 acres) of the original Rancho Jurupa grant to Benjamin Wilson. A year later, Wilson sold this property to Isaac Williams, grantee of Rancho Santa Ana del Chino, and James Johnson. Williams and Johnson then sold the property to Louis Robidoux (1796–1868), in 1849, and it eventually became known as the Robidoux ranch. Robidoux (generally spelled "Rubidoux" in the Riverside area) had previously bought Rancho San Jacinto y San Gorgonio from James (Santiago) Johnson in 1845. After California was ceded to the United States, a claim for Rancho Jurupa was filed by Louis Robidoux with the Public Land Commission in 1852, and Robidoux received a US patent for this 6,750-acre (27.3 km^{2}) portion of Rancho Jurupa in 1876. In November 1869, the California Silk Center Association was formed for the purpose of growing silkworms, and mulberry trees, citrus fruits, and grapes; it purchased over 4,000 acres (1,600 ha) of the Rubidoux Rancho for its enterprise.
