= No Heart (chief) =

Leader of the Ioway people

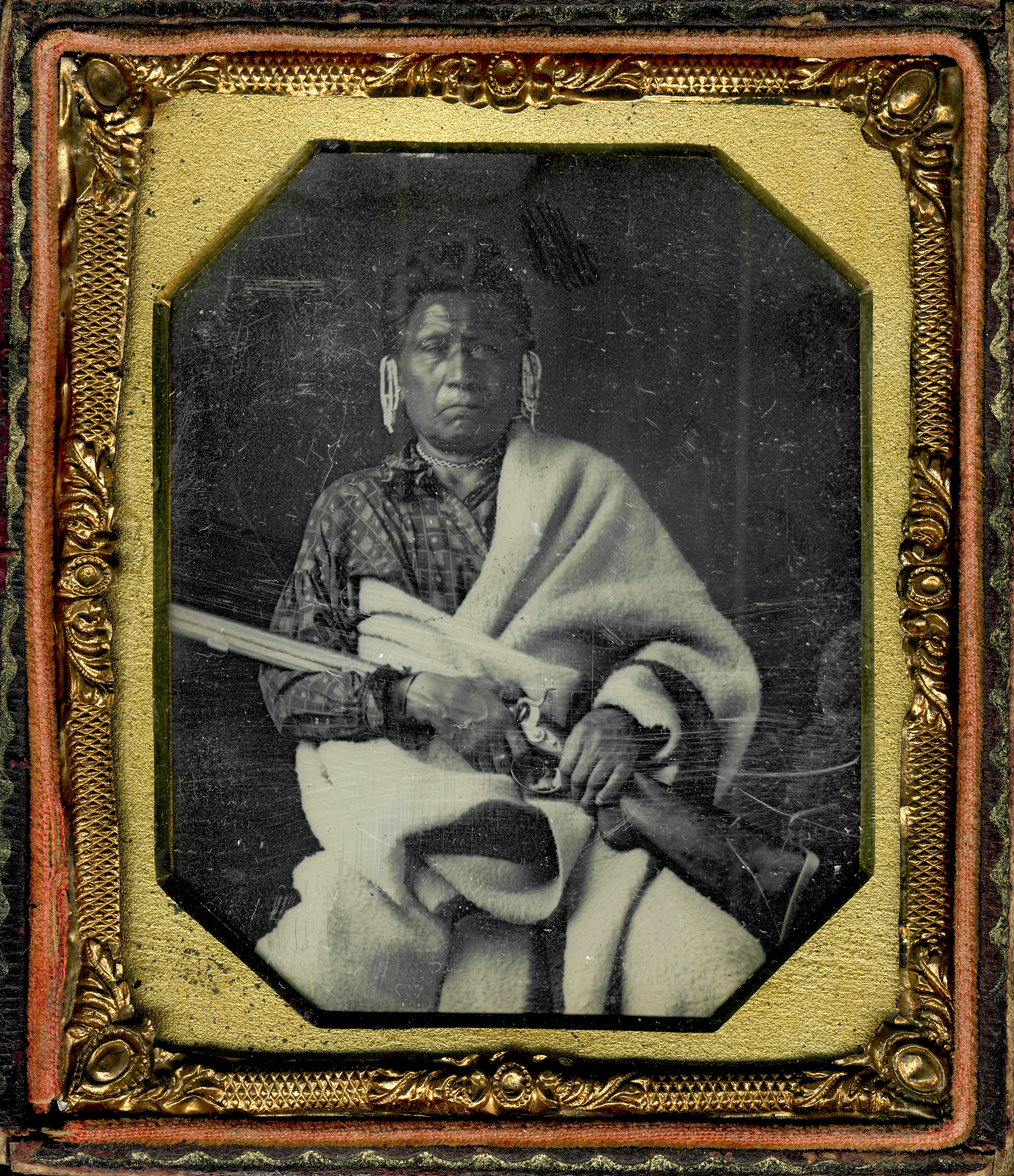

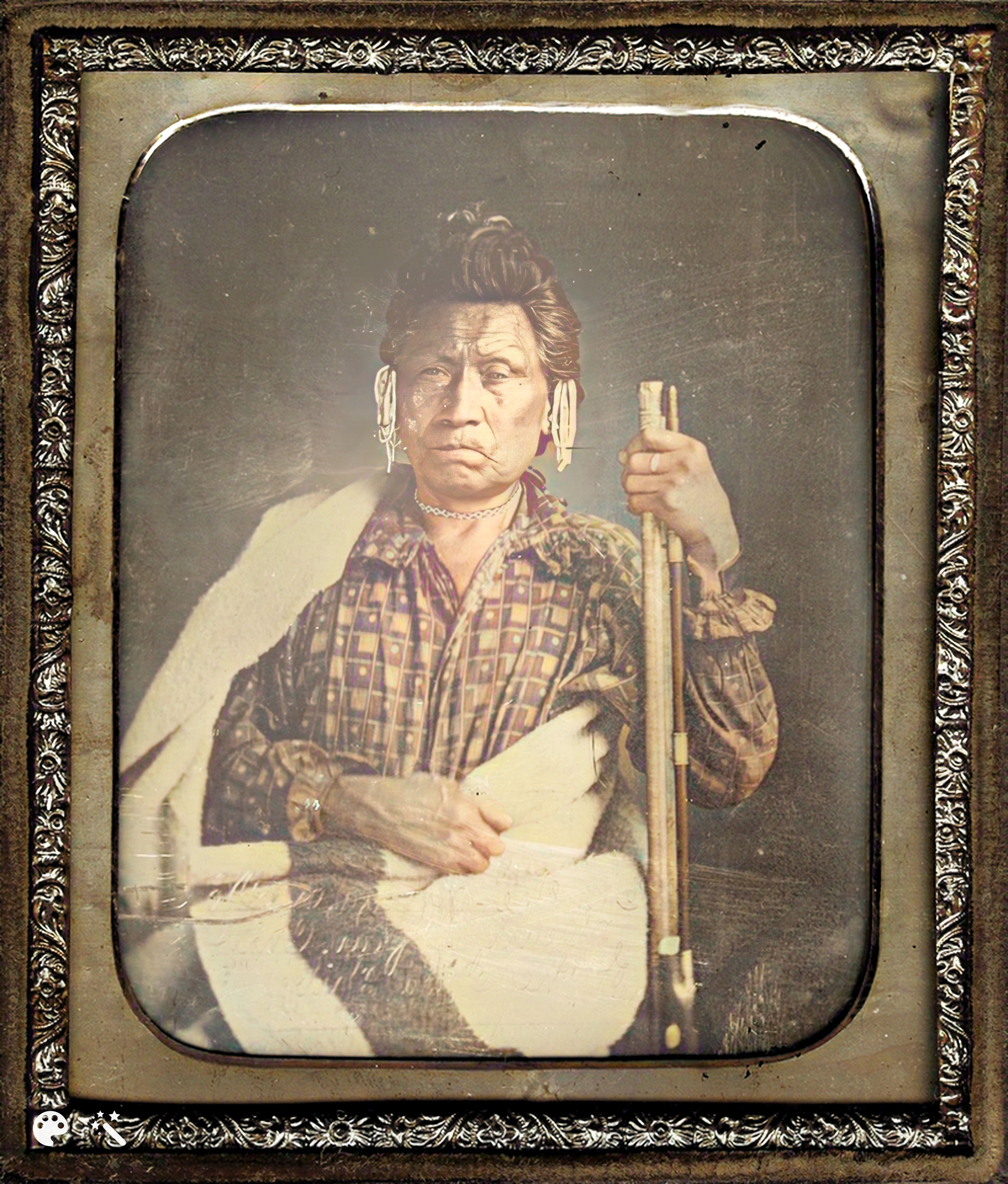
No Heart in 1847

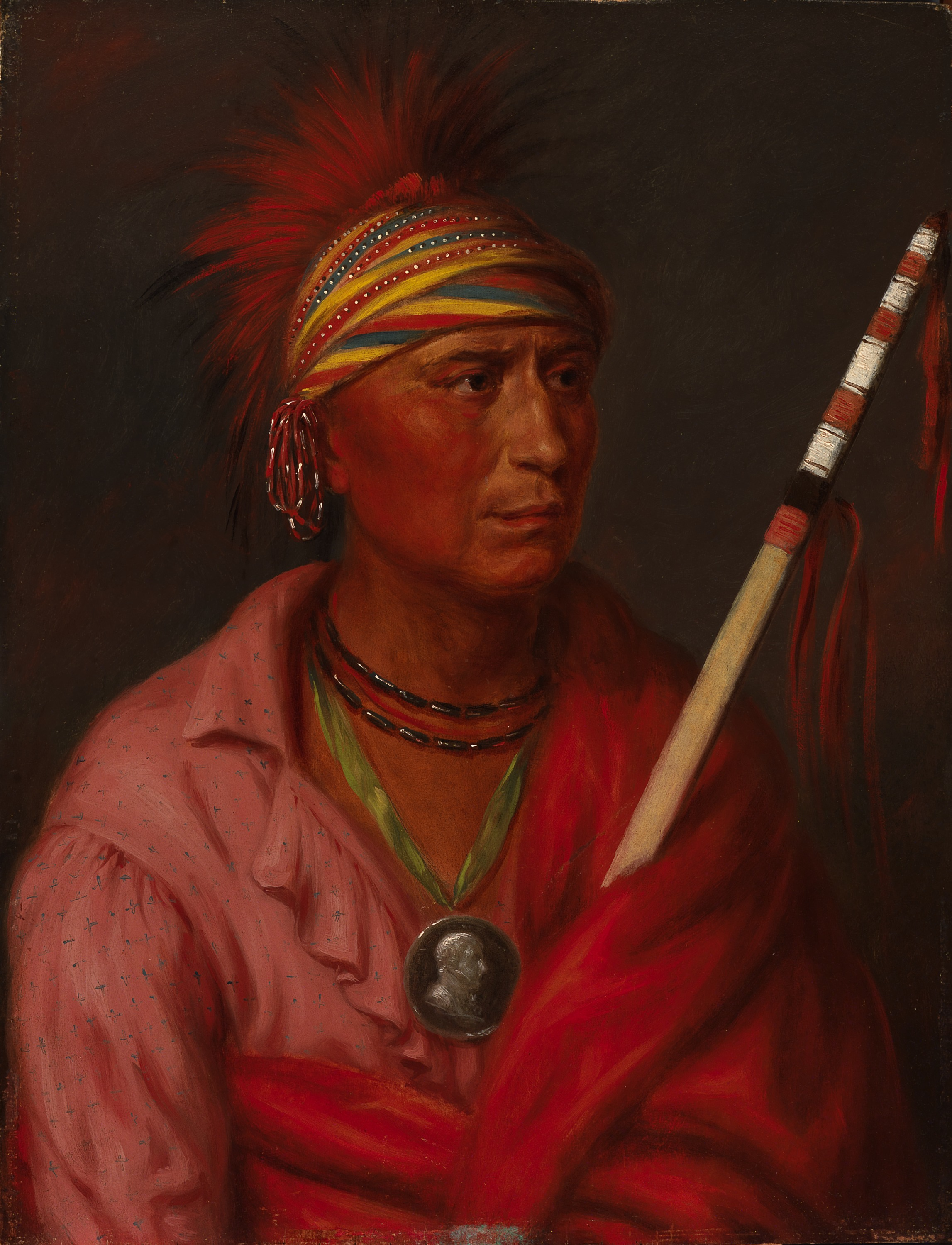
No Heart (Nan-chen-nin-ga) portrait, 1837

Notchininga, also known as No Heart or No Heart of Fear (Ioway: Náje Níŋe), was a leader of the Iowa people.

== History ==
No Heart was brother of Mahaska, or White Cloud, who served as principal chief of the Iowa until his death in 1834. Both Mahaska and No Heart were amenable to Western ways, in particular education, and attempted to live peaceably with their neighbors and the Americans. After Mahaska's death, No Heart served as the leading advisor to Mahaska's son, also named White Cloud.

In 1837, No Heart served in the Iowas' delegation to an inter-tribal congress in Washington, D.C. ostensibly aimed at settling boundary disputes between the Santee Dakota and their enemies, the Sauk and Meskwaki (Fox) peoples. The Iowas, who had already lost territory to the Sauk and Meskwaki in the Missouri River Valley, were among the various other peoples represented. The congress defined boundaries between the peoples, but also resulted in the United States appropriating much of the land of the Santee, Sauk and Meskwaki. No Heart argued that these appropriations threatened his people even more, as the Sauk and Meskwaki would now have an even greater incentive to encroach on Iowa land. He presented a detailed map of the Missouri valley demonstrating the legitimacy of Iowa claims. However, the United States disregarded No Heart's claims in favor of the powerful Sioux, Sauk, and Meskwaki.

In 1850, when White Cloud was ousted, No Heart became principal chief of the Iowa.
