= Edna Township, Cass County, Iowa =

Township in Iowa, US

Edna Township, Cass County
- Township
- Coordinates: 41°12′14″N 094°52′16″W
- Country: United States
- State: Iowa
- County: Cass

Area
  - Total: 34.66 sq mi (89.78 km^{2})
  - Land: 34.66 sq mi (89.78 km^{2})
  - Water: 0 sq mi (0 km^{2})
- Elevation: 1,158 ft (353 m)

Population (2000)
  - Total: 140
  - Density: 4.1/sq mi (1.6/km^{2})
- FIPS code: 19-91155
- GNIS feature ID: 0467768

Edna Township is one of sixteen townships in Cass County, Iowa, United States. As of the 2000 census, its population was 140.

== Geography ==
Edna Township covers an area of 34.67 square miles (89.8 km^{2}) and contains no incorporated settlements. According to the USGS, it contains two cemeteries: Reno and Calvary in the Saint Timothy Roman Catholic Church yard.

== History ==
Chief Mahaska was buried along the West Nodaway River in Edna Township after he was killed in 1834.
