= Marcella Craft =

American actress

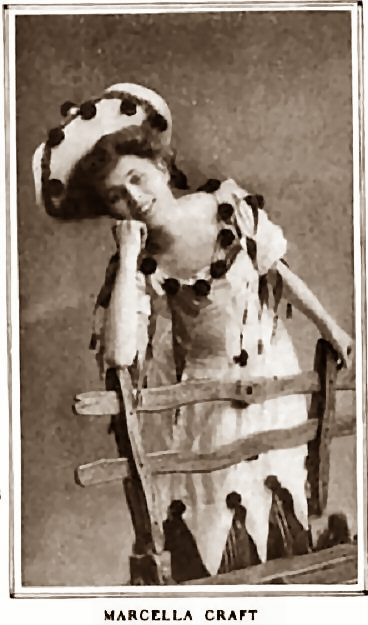
- Burr McIntosh Monthly, 1906
- Born: Marcia Craft; August 11, 1874; Indianapolis, Indiana, US
- Died: December 12, 1959 (aged 85); Riverside, California, US
- Other name: Sarah Marcia
- Occupation: Soprano
- Known for: Opera singer

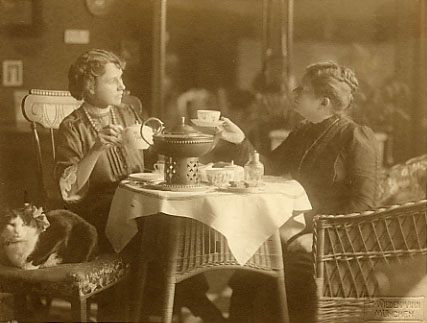
Marcella Craft with Amy Beach on Valentines Day, 1913, in Munich, Germany

Marcella Craft (August 11, 1874 – December 12, 1959) was an American operatic soprano who performed internationally in the late 19th century and early 20th century.

== Personal life ==
Born Marcia Craft in Indianapolis, Indiana, she moved with her family to Riverside, California in 1887. Craft graduated from Riverside High School in 1893. During the graduation ceremony, at Riverside's Loring Opera House, she performed her first public solo.

Encouraged by the community, and with contributions from local businessmen, Craft studied opera in Boston, Massachusetts under maestro Charles R. Adams. Upon completion of her studies, she traveled to Italy for additional tutoring.

In 1917 Craft purchased a home for her parents on Prospect Avenue in Riverside. After leaving Germany in 1932, she returned to Riverside and also lived in the Prospect Avenue home until her death in 1959. She is buried in Riverside's Evergreen Cemetery.

== Career ==
While in Italy Craft's tutor changed her name to Marcella, and she started receiving leading operatic roles. She sang with Enrico Caruso and others. Her biggest success came after she moved to Germany, where she became a lead with the Munich Opera. She was a favorite of composer Richard Strauss, working closely with the composer in a production of his opera Salome.

Although her career primarily kept her in Europe, Craft regularly returned to Riverside where she frequently sang at the annual Easter Sunrise Service on Mount Rubidoux.

Craft forged a strong personal and professional friendship with the American composer Amy Beach. They traveled together and collaborated in Europe when Craft was a prima donna in Germany. Craft hosted events for American and European musicians, which included performances of Beach's songs, accompanied on piano by the composer.
