= Francis White Cloud =

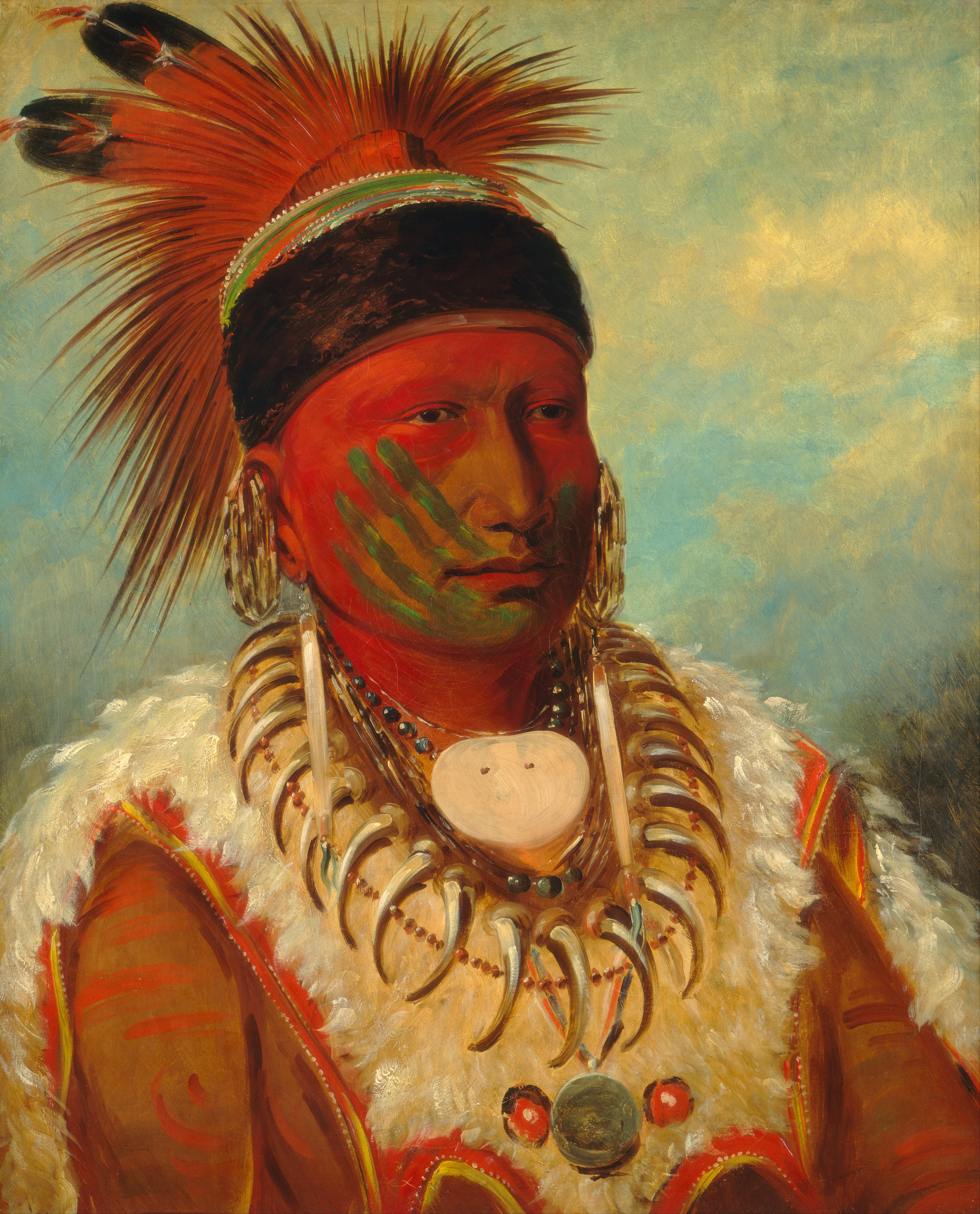
"The White Cloud, Head Chief of the Iowa" by George Catlin depicting Francis White Cloud

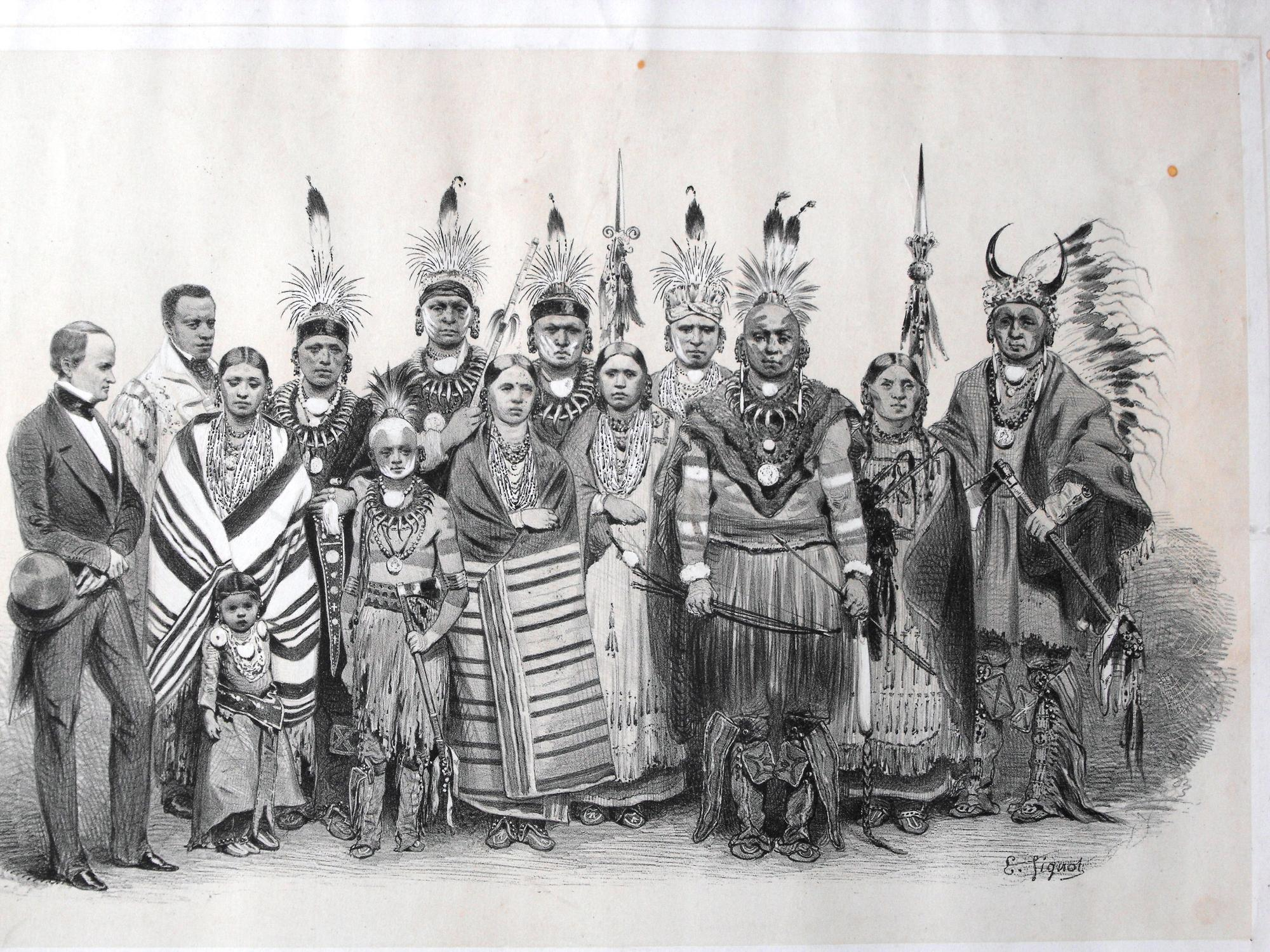
George Catlin's 1844 illustration of Ioway in Europe, Francis White Cloud is front center right; Jeffrey Deroine is second from left.

Francis White Cloud (archaic Ioway: Maxúshga, pronounced [mõxuʃꜜkɐ]; contemporary Maxúhga) (died 1859) was an Ioway chief, also called White Cloud II. He was son of Mahaska. Both father and son were called Mahaska and White Cloud.

Francis White Cloud was married to Mary Many Days Robidoux, daughter of French-American fur trader Joseph Robidoux. Their sons, James White Cloud and Jefferson White Cloud, would also be named Ioway chiefs. Francis White Cloud was known in his time for participating in a tour of Europe in 1844 and was painted by George Catlin. Francis White Cloud was also the close friend and benefactor of Jeffrey Deroine, the translator and diplomat.
