= Robidoux family =

The Robidoux family played a major role in settling Canada and America from the 17th to the 19th centuries. This family was instrumental in the history of New France and the expansion of American territories to such places as St. Joseph, Missouri, and San Bernardino, California. The descendants of the patriarch Manuel Robidoux are well known. They are discussed in Meriwether Lewis' journals, James Michener's book Centennial, and have been chronicled as traveling with frontiersman Kit Carson, as referenced below.

== Manuel Robidoux ==
Manuel Robidoux (Robido), born c. 1620, was of Santa Maria, Galicia, Spain. He married Catherine Alve. He is often incorrectly identified as of Paris, France. There is no evidence to support this. This misinformation came from the self-published book Memorial to the Robidoux Brothers: a History of the Robidouxs in America by Orral Messmore Robidoux.

== André Robidou ==
André Robidou (c. 1643 – 1678) was the son of Manuel Robidou and Catharine Alve. According to Canadian vital and church records, he was born in the parish or village of Santa Maria in land controlled by Spain, likely the Spanish Netherlands (but in an area that is now in Northern France). His birthplace is often attributed to Galicia, Spain which was then in the See or bishopric of Burgos due to this appearing in a daughter’s marriage record created several years after his death. He was married to Jeanne Denote (c. 1645–before 2 June 1696), the daughter of Antoine Denote and Catherine Leduc, of Saint-Germain-l'Auxerrois, Paris. We know little of André's life prior to 20 April 1661 when he was engaged contractually as a river sailor in Nantes, Brittany (now Loire-Atlantique, Pays-de-la-Loire, France). André, now in La Rochelle, Aunis (currently Charente-Maritime, Poitou-Charentes, France) entered a contract of engagement with Antoine Grignon, on behalf of merchant Eustache Lambert, obligating André to go to Nouvelle-France and work for 3 years. Late spring or summer, possibly working as a member of the crew, André sailed from La Rochelle, France to Île-Percé (on the Gaspé Peninsula of Quebec), Acadia and finally to Quebec aboard La Marguerite, a ship originally hailing from Dieppe, Normandy, (now Seine-Maritime), France. He arrived in the city of Quebec in late summer 1661. In 1664, André received two concessions of land, one in what is now Saint-Laurent on Île d'Orléans down river from Quebec, and one in Cote Lauzon (now Levis, Quebec). Which came first is unknown. On 13 May 1665 André Robidou signed on as a sailor aboard the royal galiotte, a type of small ship that worked the river trade hailing from Quebec. He later gave up his concessions of land. He appeared in the 1666 Quebec census as a matelot/sailor living with Eustache Lambert. André's wife was one of the Filles du Roi, the King's Daughters, sent to Quebec to promote marriage, family formation, birth of children and therefore expansion of population. The date of their marriage is 7 June 1667 in the city of Quebec. We know from her marriage record that her mother was still living but her father was not. She likely arrived in Quebec the previous fall. André and Jeanne had five children, the first daughter born in Québec in 1669, the rest, including Guillaume Robidoux, were born in the seigneurie of La Prairie, Quebec, having moved there around 1671. André died 31 Mar 1678, about 35, in the home of a surgeon in Montreal and then was buried in Montreal. His widow Jeanne married Jacques Surprenant and thus became the founding mother of not one, but two of Canada's largest families.

== Guillaume Robidou ==
Guillaume Robidou (25 November 1675 – 8 July 1754) was the son of André Robidou and Jeanne Denote. He was born in La Prairie and part of the first generation of the Robidoux family born in North America.

Guillaume married Marie Françoise Guérin (1681–1757) on 11 June 1697 in Montreal. Marie was born on 25 Apr 1681 in Cernay-les-Reims, France to Sylvain Guerin and Marie Brazeau and came to Canada at an early age with her parents. Her father was a cobbler and mother a cabaret performer. Marie Françoise Guérin was born and christened on 17 Oct 1680 in Amboise, Tours, Touraine, Indre-et-Loire, France. She married Guillaume at 16 a year after her father's death in France. However, he had left some nine years earlier when she would have been seven. He had married Marie Brazeau at St-Denis in Amboise 30–10–1679. He was returned to France around 1688 and was hanged for bigamy. His first legal wife is unknown but is clear he went to New France with Marie ahead of the law. Françoise was the eldest of her mother's six children, only one of whom shared her father as well. Guillaume and Françoise moved to Longueuil, a seigneurie – elevated into a barony in 1710 – adjacent to La Prairie, in 1705. (The seigneurie had been granted to Jacques le Moyne in 1672 but had been inherited by his son of the same name and, after the latter died, acquired and ultimately expanded by a different son named Charles le Moyne).

Guillaume was a teenager at the time of the British attempt to capture Quebec (the Battle of Quebec) in 1690 and likely took part in the city's defence since the Governor, Frontenac, had been in Montreal and headed off to Quebec City when he learned of the English arrival but had left Callières, the Governor of Montreal, behind with orders to follow him there with all his troops except a small garrison, and to collect as many as possible of the militia on the way ... and "on the way" would have included La Prairie. Guillaume entered the fur trade in Canada as it was steadily growing. Guillaume and Françoise had 13 children, four of whom died before their first birthday. Joseph Robidoux I was the second son, born 20 March 1701, the great-grandfather of the famous Robidoux brothers who helped explore, open trade routes and settle the western United States. Guillaume died on 8 July 1754 in Montreal, and was buried at the Basilique Notre-Dame.

== Joseph Robidoux I ==
Joseph Robidoux I (20 March 1701 – 1778), the second son of Guillaume Robidou and Marie Françoise Guérin. He was born in La Prairie, a seigneurie in New France (which became today is part of the province of Quebec, Canada), and was part of the second generation of the Robidoux family born in North America. Because of the large number of descendants named Joseph Robidoux, the significant ones are highlighted by Roman numerals, even though they did not use such an indicator during their lives.

The vulnerabilities demonstrated by the Battle of Quebec in 1690 caused the Canadians to bolster defensive positions, which served their purpose until the Battle of Quebec (Battle of the Plains of Abraham) in 1759 when the British were successful in their assault. This was known by the British as part of the Annus Mirabilis of 1759. Two of the sons of Joseph, François and Antoine, died in this battle. Following his father's profession, Joseph entered the fur trade at its peak. By the middle half of the 18th century the fur trade was in a slow decline, and Joseph's children began migrating south to American cities such as Detroit, Chicago and St. Louis.

He married twice, first to Marie-Anne Fonteneau (1 December 1699 – 16 February 1735), daughter of Pierre Fonteneau, and had six children including Joseph Robidoux II. Widowed, Joseph married second to Marie-Louise Robert (b. 17 October 1715), daughter of André Robert, and had seven children. Joseph died in Yamaska, Quebec, Canada, in 1778.

== Joseph Robidoux II ==
Joseph Robidoux II (13 September 1722 – 28 August 1778) was the son of Joseph Robidoux I and Marie-Anne Fonteneau. Joseph was part of the second generation of the Robidoux family born in North America. He married Marie Anne Le Blanc (1724–1770), whose great-grandparents emigrated from Normandy, France, in the 17th century.

With the slowing of the fur trade and repeated conflicts with the British, Joseph and his family began to look south for better prospects. War between France and England in the colonies resumed in the War of Jenkins' Ear in 1739, with France in alliance with Spain. The fortress at Louisbourg was constructed to protect to Gulf of St. Lawrence and to allow the French to raid British sites in New England. The Siege of Louisbourg in 1745 resulted in the capture of the fortress (although it was returned to England three years later as part of the treaty that ended that particular conflict). Following this, Joseph and his family traversed the Chicago Portage to relocate to St. Louis. Members of the family also settled in Detroit.

Marie also came from a distinguished family that settled in Quebec in the 18th century. Her great-grandfather was Abraham Martin l’Écossais (the Scotsman), a royal pilot on the St. Lawrence River. The Plains of Abraham are named for him. This is where a famous battle of the Seven Years' War (the French and Indian War) between the British and the French was fought in 1759.

Joseph and Marie had four children, including Joseph Robidoux III. Joseph died in St. Louis, Missouri, in 1778.

== Joseph Robidoux III and later generations ==
Joseph III and his wife Catherine Marie Rollet had eight children that lived to adulthood including:

- Joseph Robidoux IV, referred to as the Founder, due to his founding of St. Joseph, Missouri,
- Antoine Robidoux, and
- Louis Robidoux, founder of Riverside, California

Today, the Robidoux family is widespread throughout North America, with thousands of descendants active in preserving the legacy of their common ancestor Manuel.

== Sources ==
- Willoughby, Robert J., The Brothers Robidoux and the Opening of the American West, University of Missouri Press, Columbia, 2012
- Lewis, Hugh M., Robidoux Chronicicles, French-Indian Etnoculture of the Trans-Mississippi West, Trafford, Canada, 2004
- Hafen, Leroy R. (ed.), Trappers of the Far West, University of Nebraska Press, Lincoln, 1965
- Reyher, Ken, Antoine Robidoux and Fort Uncompahgre, The Story of a Colorado Fur Trader, Western Reflections Publishing Company, Lake City, Colorado, 1998
- Thwaites, Reuben Gold (ed.), Original Journals of the Lewis & Clark Expedition, 1804-1806, Arno Press, New York, 1969
- Michener, James A., Centennial, Random House, New York, 1974, pg. 300
