= Robidoux Row =

- U.S. National Register of Historic Places
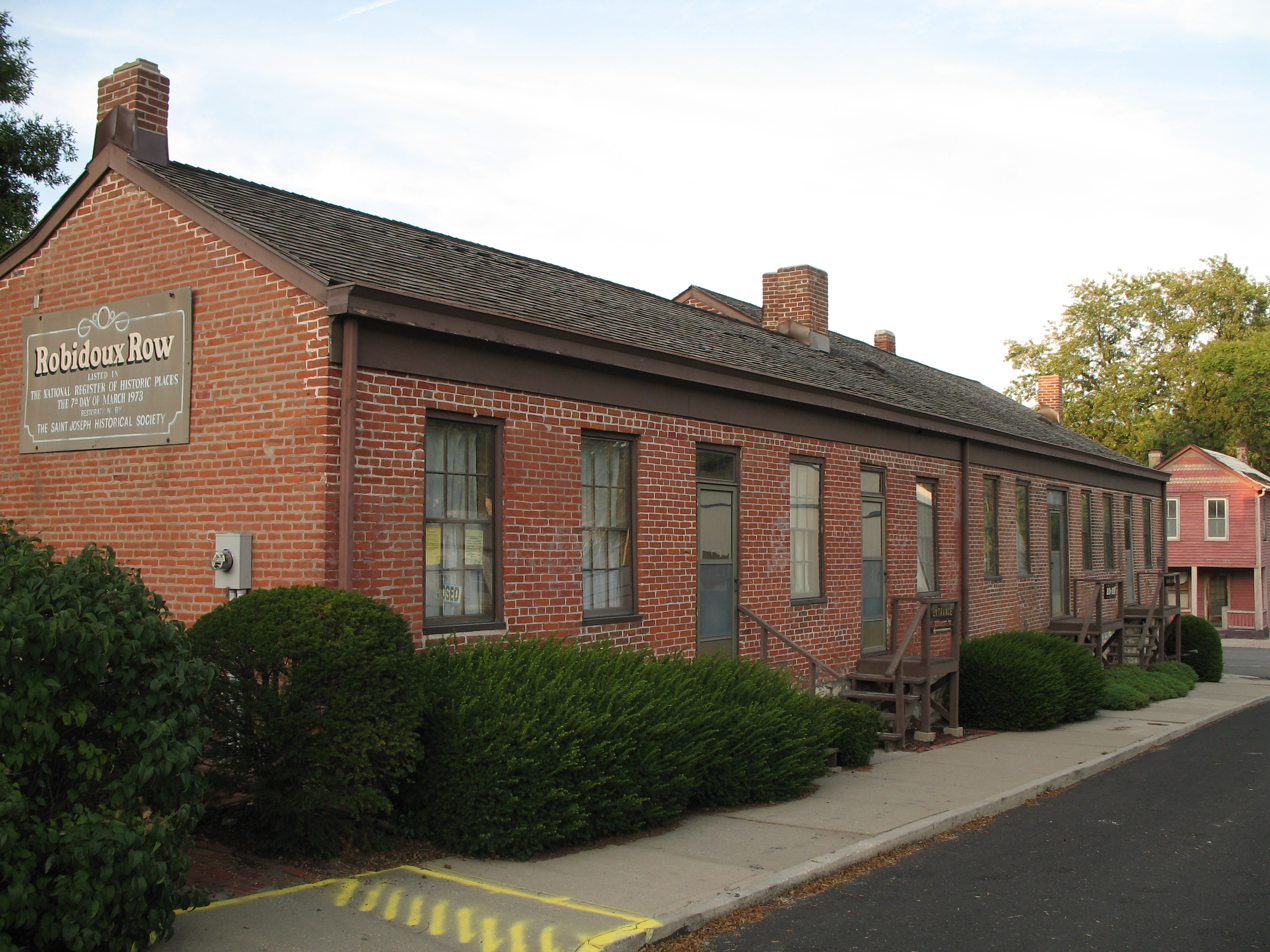
- Robidoux Row

- Location within Missouri Location within the United States
- Location: 219-225 E. Poulin St., St. Joseph, Missouri
- Coordinates: 39°46′29″N 94°51′27″W
- Area: 9.9 acres (4.0 ha)
- Built: 1849
- NRHP reference No.: 73001037
- Added to NRHP: March 7, 1973

Robidoux Row is a historic apartment building located at 219-225 East Poulin Street in St. Joseph, Missouri. It was built by St. Joseph founder Joseph Robidoux in north St. Joseph in the late 1840s/early 1850s. It is a 1 1/2-story brick structure with an attached single story brick building. Robidoux lived there at one point. The Saint Joseph Historical Society has renovated the building and operates it as a local history museum.

It was added to the National Register of Historic Places in 1973.
