= Mount Rubidoux =

Mountain in Riverside, California, United States

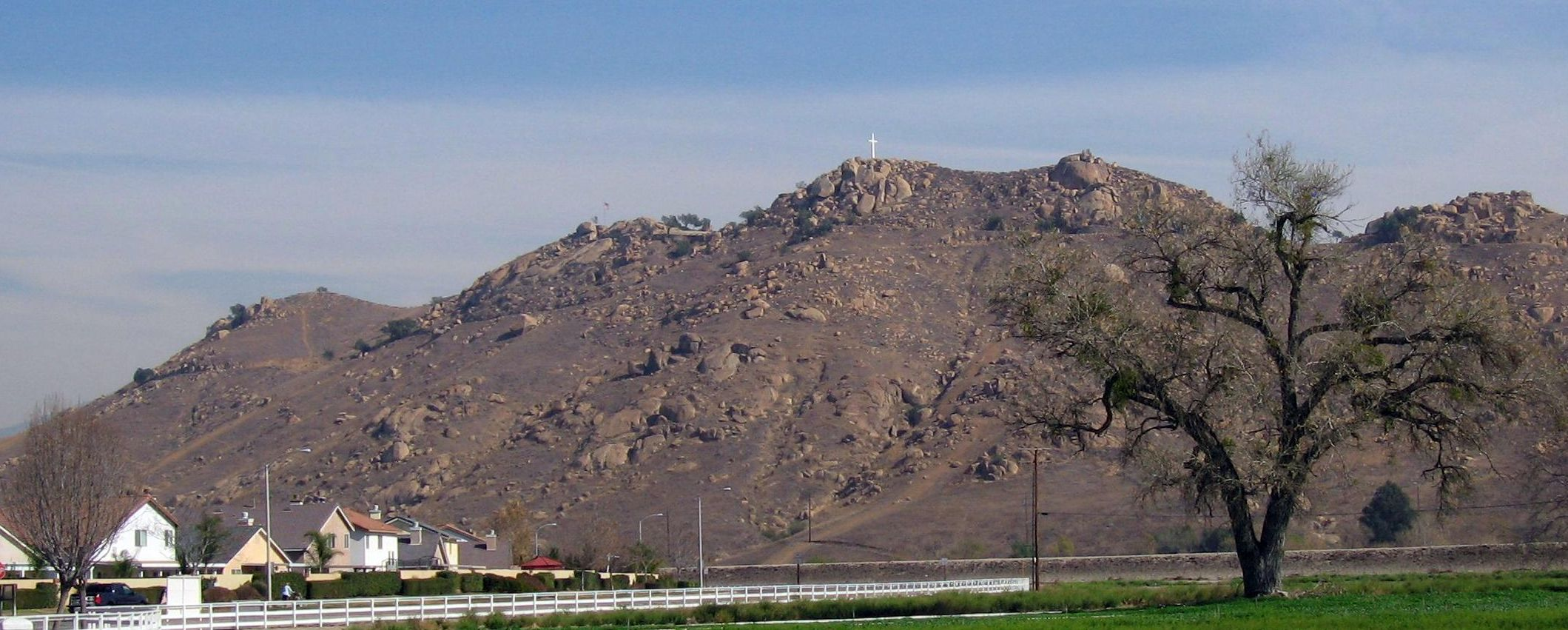

Highest point
- Elevation: 1,331 ft (406 m) NAVD 88
- Prominence: 484 ft (148 m)
- Coordinates: 33°59′02″N 117°23′35″W

Geography
- Location within California Location within the United States
- Location: Riverside, California, United States
- Parent range: San Bernardino Mountains
- Topo map: USGS Riverside West

Mount Rubidoux is a mountain just west of downtown in the city of Riverside, California, United States, that has been designated a city park and landmark. The mountain was once a popular Southern California tourist destination and is still the site of the oldest outdoor non-denominational Easter Sunrise service in the United States. Many historic markers and memorials have been placed on the mountain, the most prominent being the cross at the summit dedicated to Father Junípero Serra. A majority of Mt. Rubidoux is owned by the City of Riverside, while 0.43 acres at the peak is owned by Rivers & Lands Conservancy after the cross attracted a potential lawsuit and the city decided to sell it at auction to a private organization (see Legal battle below).

The Santa Ana River flows at the base of the mountain, marking the boundary between the city of Riverside and the Rubidoux neighborhood of the City of Jurupa Valley.

The mountain was named for Louis Rubidoux, who established Rancho Rubidoux in 1847, after purchasing a portion of the Rancho Jurupa from Benjamin Davis Wilson, the second elected mayor of Los Angeles.

== History ==
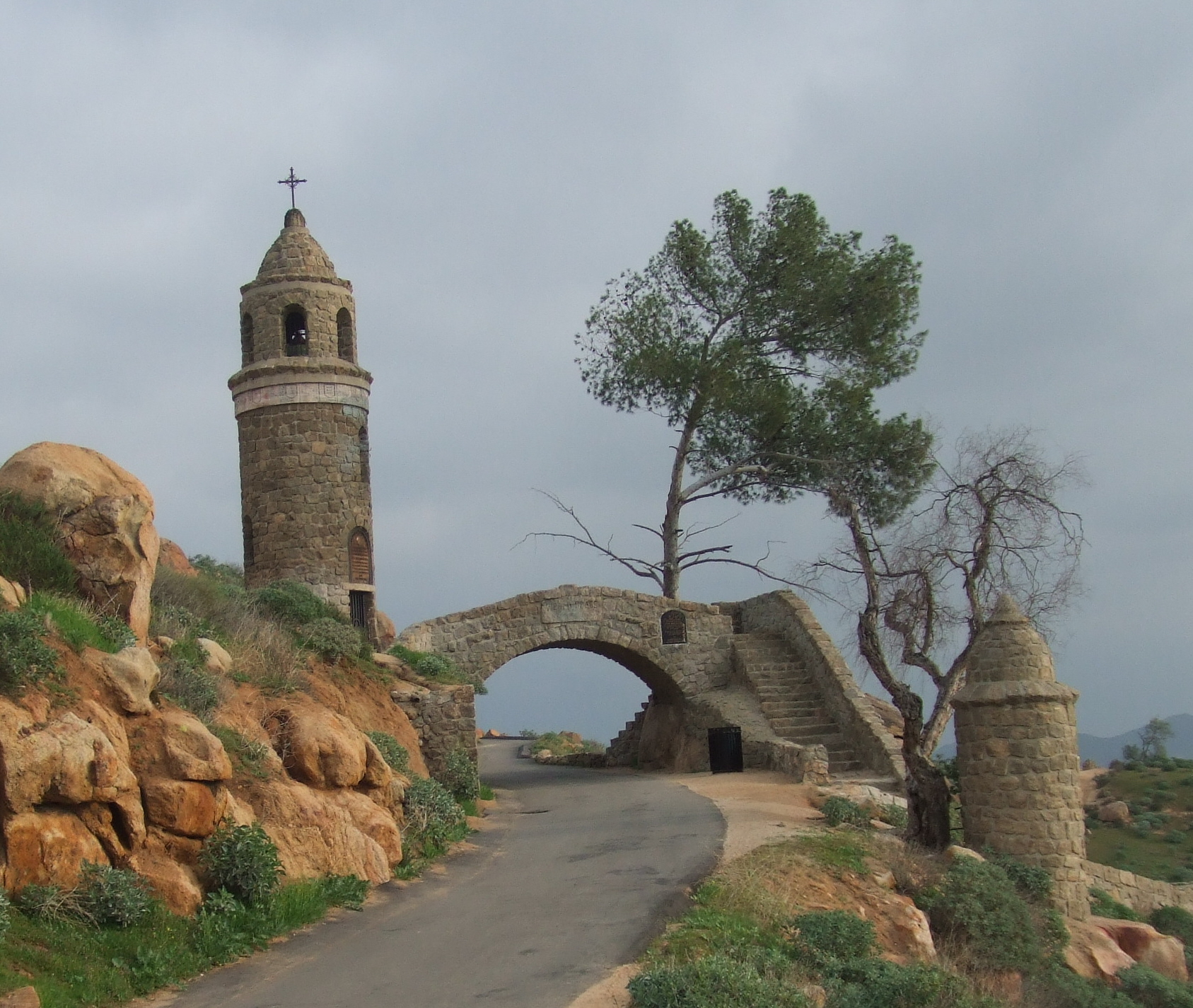
The World Peace Bridge on Mount Rubidoux.

Tom Patterson, as well as most local Riverside historians, have concluded that the original name of Mount Rubidoux was Pachappa. They speculate that one of the early owners of Rancho Jurupa reassigned the name Pachappa to another, smaller hill, in order to expand the property of the Rancho. Since Pachappa hill was designated as the southeast marker of the Jurupa Rancho, which was granted by the Mexican government to Juan Bandini in 1838, reassigning the name to the current Pachappa Hill would have expanded the Rancho Jurupa significantly, incorporating all of the area covered by today's downtown Riverside. It is also possible the United States government renamed the hills in order to satisfy acreage requirements of the original Mexican land Grant.

In 1906 Frank Miller, owner of the Mission Inn, along with Henry E. Huntington and Charles M. Loring, formed the Huntington Park Association and purchased the property with the intent to build a road to the summit and develop the mountain as a park to benefit the city of Riverside. Originally the park was named Huntington Park, but the name was changed to the Frank A. Miller Mount Rubidoux Memorial Park after the heirs of Frank Miller donated the property to the city in 1955. On December 13, 1925, the Testimonial Peace Tower was dedicated to Miller. The bridge is a replica of a noted bridge in Alcántara, Spain. A plaque for 1932 Olympic equestrian Shunzo Kido was placed on the bridge in 1934 honoring his sacrifice of an Olympic medal in order to save his horse, Kyu Gun, from lameness.

Initial improvements, including the road, were completed in February 1907. The first memorial marker on the mountain, the cross and tablet at the summit honoring Father Junipero Serra, was dedicated on April 26, 1907. Serra supposedly often travelled through the valley and rested at Rubidoux Rancho.

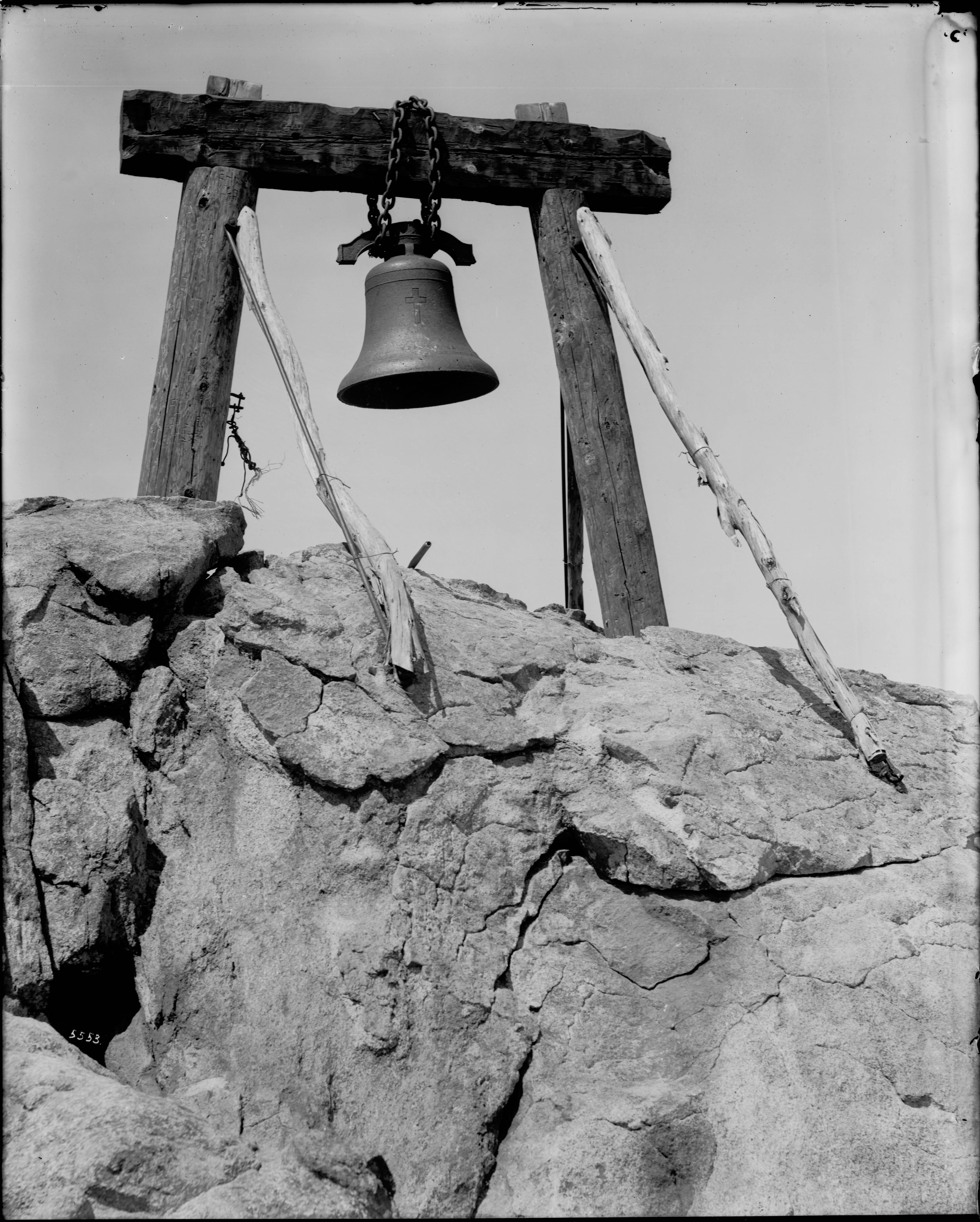
The bell on top of Mt. Rubidoux, Riverside, c. 1910

A sunset over Mount Rubidoux, in 1909, was the occasion for Carrie Jacobs-Bond to compose her famous song "A Perfect Day" which for many years was played each day as the last tune on the Mission Inn's carillon.

Mount Rubidoux was designated Riverside City Landmark no. 26, and has been a city park since 1955, when the land was donated to the city by Frank Miller's heirs. The park features 3.5 miles of paved and dirt hiking trails.

=== Easter sunrise service ===
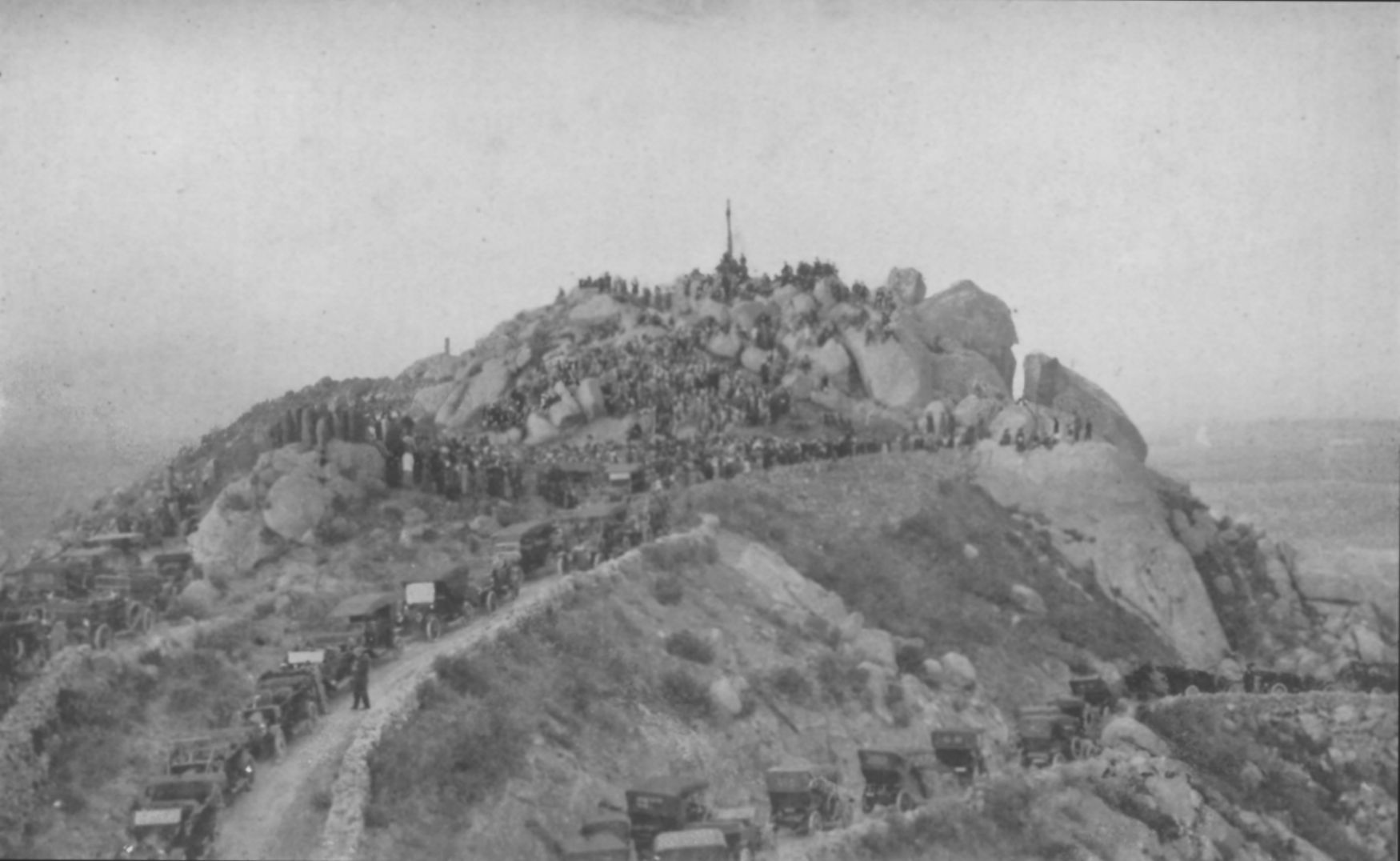
1913 Mt Rubidoux Easter Sunrise Services.

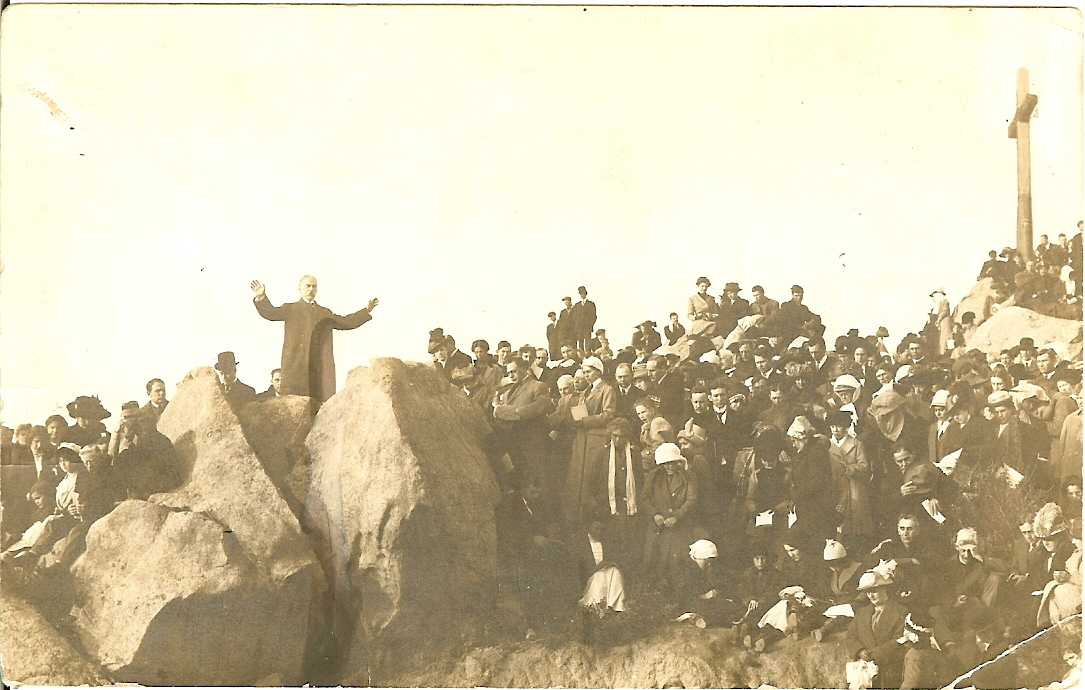
Henry van Dyke on Mount Rubidoux; Easter Sunrise services

In April 1909, Jacob Riis of New York, a friend of President Theodore Roosevelt, was in town to give an address at the Mission Inn. He suggested holding an Easter sunrise service at the top of the mountain, and on the following Sunday the first non-denominational outdoor Easter Sunrise Service in the United States was held at the top of the mount.

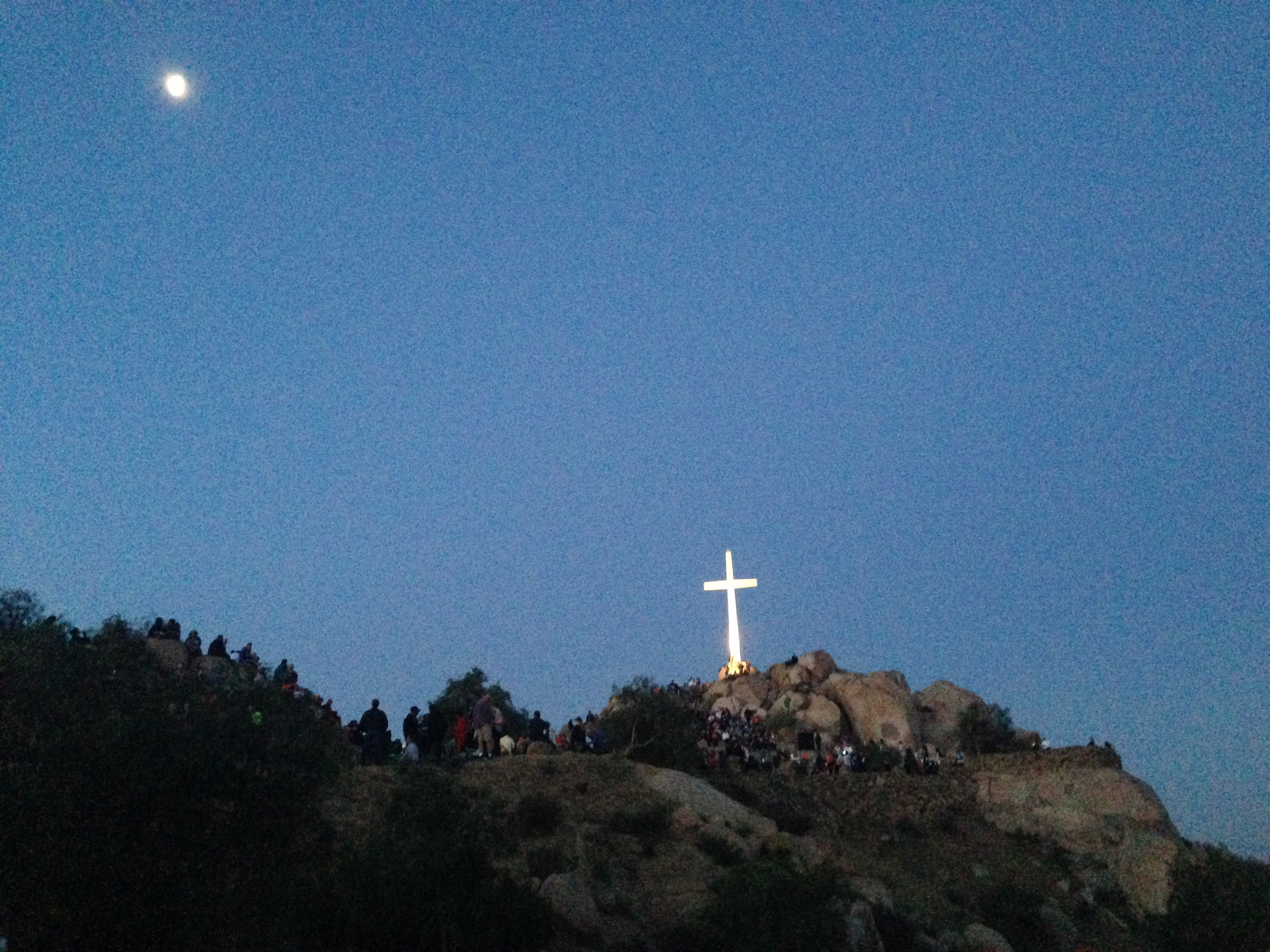
2014 Mt. Rubidoux Easter Sunrise Service

In 1912 an estimated crowd of 3,000 people were present to hear Henry Van Dyke read his poem, God of the Open Air. Each year attendance grew. In 1918 plans for an open-air 10,000-seat amphitheater designed by architect Frederick Heath were considered, but they were never implemented.

The annual service became nationally and internationally known, drawing huge crowds and celebrities, including opera soprano Marcella Craft. In 1915 the Southern Pacific Railroad provided a special service from Los Angeles to Riverside just for the event. The Pacific Electric trolley system also implemented special service from Los Angeles, Corona, Redlands, and San Bernardino. Peak attendance in the 1920s was reported to have exceeded 30,000.

The popularity of the Rubidoux Easter sunrise services spawned many other such services throughout the country, including an annual service at the Hollywood Bowl.

=== Legal battle ===
In November 2012 the legal advocacy organization, Americans United for Separation of Church and State sent a letter to the City of Riverside threatening a lawsuit for having a large cross on city-owned property. The group believes that owning the cross violates a legal doctrine set forth in the Establishment Clause of the First Amendment to the United States Constitution, which says "Congress shall make no law respecting an establishment of religion, or prohibiting the free exercise thereof".

In a city council meeting on January 22, 2013, the City of Riverside city council decided to sell the cross atop Mount Rubidoux as well as 0.43 acres of land beneath it. The land includes a portion of the rocky hilltop, the cross, the steps beneath it, and a small portion of the asphalted area at the bottom of the steps. The land would be sold at public auction on April 11, 2013, with a minimum bid of $10,000.

A group named "Totally Mt. Rubidoux" was formed in response to the potential lawsuit threatened in late 2012. The group is a collaborative effort by the Friends of Mt. Rubidoux, Mission Inn Foundation & Museum, and Rivers & Lands Conservancy (then Riverside Land Conservancy) to ensure that the property on the peak of Mt. Rubidoux is substantially preserved in its current state, reasonably maintained, and kept accessible to members of the public for their enjoyment. Through a fundraising campaign to raise money to purchase the peak at auction, and maintain it in perpetuity, with help from the community Totally Mt. Rubidoux raised nearly $260,000.

On April 11, 2013, Totally Mt. Rubidoux placed the winning bid of $10,500 on the peak of Mt. Rubidoux, purchasing it in the name of Rivers & Lands Conservancy to be the sole owner and manager of Mt. Rubidoux Peak. After the purchasing costs, and setting aside funds for three years of management, education, and stewardship, about $190,000 were invested in a non-wasting endowment so that the interest earned could be used to manage the land in perpetuity.

== Mount Rubidoux today ==
Mount Rubidoux continues to be an important landmark and valued asset to the people of Riverside. On April 12, 2009, the 100th anniversary of the Easter Sunrise service was held at the top of Mount Rubidoux. The city launches its premier fireworks show from the top of the mountain every Fourth of July.

Mount Rubidoux Park is open from dawn until dusk. It covers 161 acres (0.65 km^{2}; 0.252 sq mi) and features 3.5 miles (5.6 km) of paved roads and several dirt hiking trails. The park is closed to vehicular traffic, but improvements in 2009 boosted the number of daily walkers, joggers, and bicyclists. The hill is also a popular place for bouldering, particularly for beginners in the sport.

All roads and trails are maintained in good condition by the city and by the Friends of Mount Rubidoux, a non-profit organization formed by citizen volunteers to restore, preserve, and beautify Mount Rubidoux Park, to enhance knowledge of the rich history of Mount Rubidoux Park, and to foster enjoyment by visitors to Mount Rubidoux.

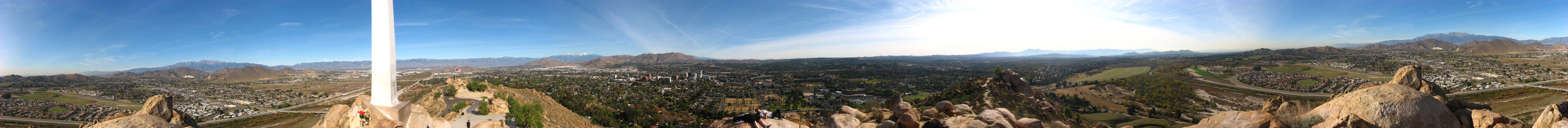
A 360 degree panorama of Riverside, California, taken from the summit of Mount Rubidoux. In the distant center of the photograph the buildings of the Downtown area are visible.

== See also ==
- Mount Soledad Cross lawsuits, lengthy legal battle regarding the cross located near San Diego, California
- Salazar v. Buono, United States Supreme Court case upholding constitutionality of the Mojave Memorial Cross
- Mount Davidson (California) § The cross, legal challenges to the Mount Davidson Cross in San Francisco
- Serra Cross (Ventura, California), cross on public land in Ventura, California, which was the subject of litigation

== Bibliography ==
- Craft, Marcella. Easter sunrise pilgrimage to Father Serra Cross, Mount Rubidoux, Riverside, California. OCLC 681961493
- Fry, Craig. Southern California Bouldering Guide, Morris Book Publishing, 1995. ISBN 9780934641579. OCLC 35086352
- Baber, Zonia. "Peace Symbols." Chicago Schools Journal 18, no. 7–10 (1937): 151–158.
- Gale, Zona. Frank Miller of the Mission Inn. New York, D. Appleton-Century Co., 1938. OCLC 2181944
- Gunther, Jane Davies. Riverside County, California, Place Names; Their Origins and Their Stories, Riverside, CA, 1984. LCCN 84-72920. OCLC 12103181
- Hutchings, DeWitt V. The Story of Mount Rubidoux, Riverside, California. OCLC 124173831
- Patterson, Tom. A Colony for California: Riverside's First Hundred Years. The Riverside Museum Associates, 1996. OCLC 211217
- Patterson, Tom. Landmarks of Riverside, and the Stories Behind Them. Press~Enterprise Co., Riverside, CA, 1964. OCLC 3512580
- Wenzel, Glenn and Wenzel, Seth (illust.) Anecdotes on Mount Rubidoux and Frank A. Miller, her promoter. Riverside, CA, 2010 ISBN 9781450705028. OCLC 604994425
- Wenzel, Glenn. "Anecdotes on Frank Miller and the Mount Rubidoux Easter pilgrimages", Journal of the Riverside Historical Society, Riverside, CA, Number 13, February 2009.
