= Louis Rubidoux =

Founder of Rubidoux, California (1796–1868)

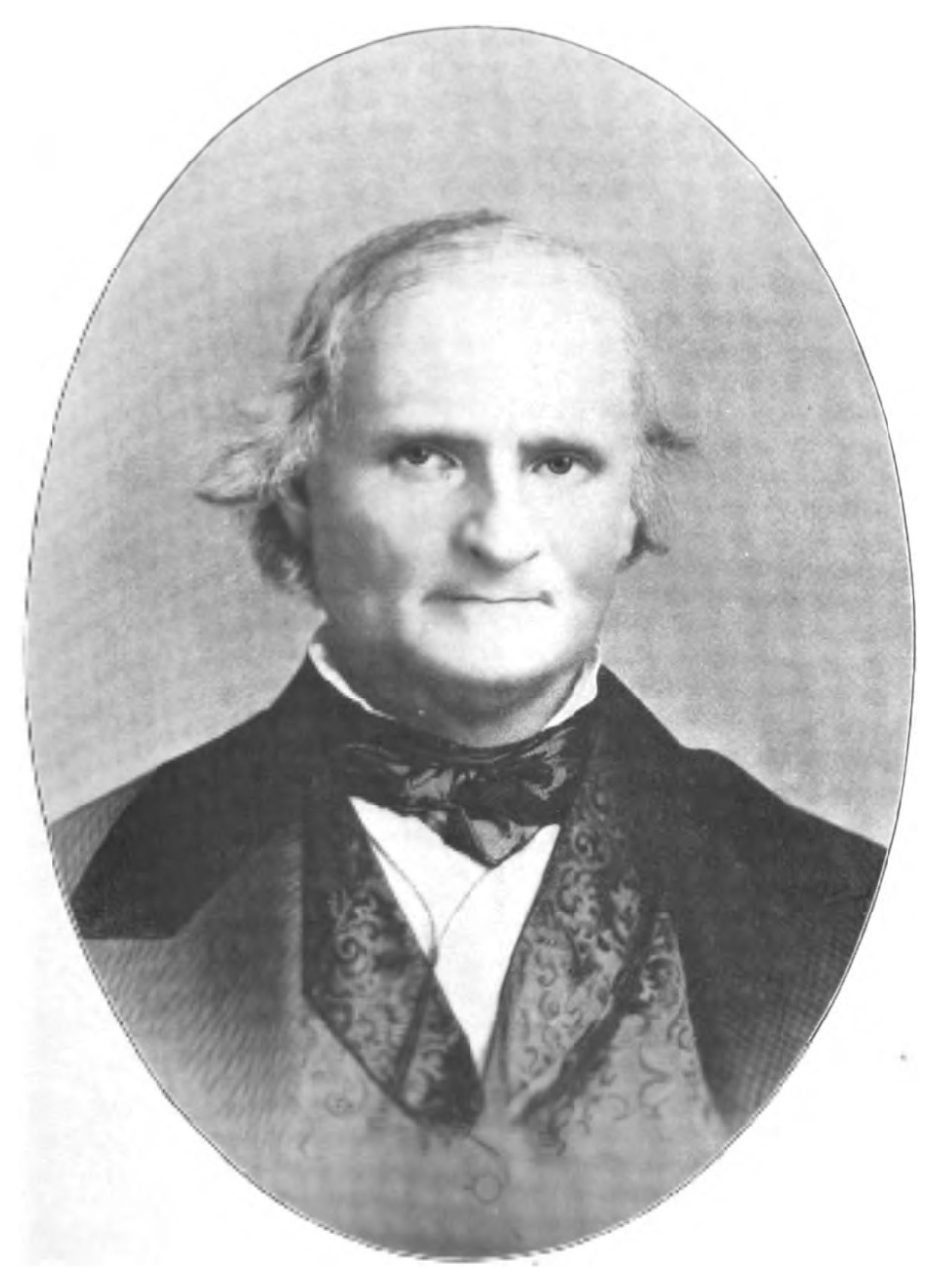
- Born: 1796; St Louis, Missouri
- Died: 1868 (aged 71–72); Colton, California
- Other name: Louis Robidoux
- Occupations: Rancher, Politician
- Known for: Founder of Rubidoux, California

Louis Rubidoux Home
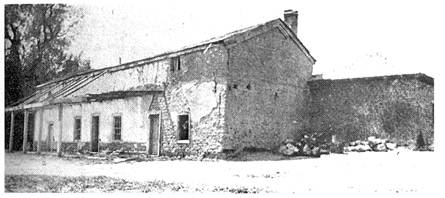
- Louis Rubidoux Home in 1897

- Location within California
- 33°59′49″N 117°24′22″W
- Location: 5575 block, Mission Blvd, Rubidoux, California

History
- Built: 1897

California Historical Landmark
- Designated: March 29, 1933
- Reference no.: 102

Rubidoux Grist Mill
- Location: Rubidoux, California

History
- Built: 1846

California Historical Landmark
- Designated: September 12, 1939
- Reference no.: 303

Louis Rubidoux (1796–1868, born Louis Robidoux) was an early settler in the area of modern-day Riverside, California, United States. He was son of Joseph Robidoux III and Catherine Marie Rollet. He arrived in California in 1844. He bought Rancho San Jacinto y San Gorgonio from James (Santiago) Johnson in 1845, and a portion of the Rancho Jurupa from Benjamin Wilson in 1849. Rubidoux became a successful rancher. He built the first grist mill in the area, operated a winery, and became one of San Bernardino County's first three supervisors. The town of Rubidoux and Mount Rubidoux in Riverside County, California are named for him.

== Biography ==
Louis Rubidoux was born in St. Louis, Missouri on July 7, 1796. As a young man, Louis Rubidoux, was one of many of French-Canadian ancestry who worked as fur trappers and mountain men in northern New Mexico. He experienced friction with Charles Bent, one of the most formidable businessmen in Taos at the time. Since the 1830s, Robidoux - accompanied by New Mexicans Lorenzo Trujillo, Hipolito Espinosa and Santiago Martinez - had made treks from New Mexico to California to trade New Mexican blankets for California horses. New Mexicans had established a colony of over 150 families between 1840 and 1850. California ranchers Lugo and later Juan Bandini with the help of Lorenzo Trujillo and Santiago Martinez, had recruited the New Mexicans from Abiquiu, in exchange for land, to help fend off indigenous people from taking their horses. However, Rubidoux did not settle in California until 1844. At the time, accompanied by his New Mexican wife and their infant daughter as well as his namesake nephew Luisito, he came through Sonora to live at Agua Mansa near today's Colton in the Riverside-San Bernardino area. Benjamin Davis Wilson of Tennessee, a fellow fur trapper in Taos, a couple of years before had accompanied John Rowland and William Workman in their 1841 trek from Taos, through Abiqiui, to settle in Agua Mansa.

Rubidoux later moved from Agua Mansa west to a town and mountain near Riverside that bear his name. In New Mexico, Rubidoux and Wilson had been friends, but in California they were on different sides of an issue pertaining to the land rights of the New Mexican settlers. Rubidoux had joined a suit to deprive them of some of the disputed Bandini land that had been donated to the New Mexicans. Wilson, before the California Supreme Court, delivered “strong testimony” against Robidoux on behalf of the New Mexican colonists. In later years, Wilson lived closer to Los Angeles and worked in the timber industry, becoming mayor of the city. Mt. Wilson is named after him.

Louis Rubidoux was a participant in the US-Mexican War. He called himself a “prisoner of war” in a letter he wrote in the fall of 1846 to Spanish-born US Consul Manuel Alvarez residing in Santa Fe. Rubidoux addresses Alvarez as “My dear sir and friend.” They had known each other for several years during the time Rubidoux lived in New Mexico. Alvarez had written Rubidoux two letters, one recounting the Taos Uprising of 1847. This is a response to both in which Rubidoux relates his experience in the California theatre of the U.S.-Mexican War.

A few weeks after General Stephen Watts Kearny occupied Santa Fe on the August 18, 1846, Rubidoux and his neighbor Benjamin Wilson—together with 18 estrangeros or “strangers,” i.e., foreigners, non-Mexicans, met at Wilson's home. The following day, Rubidoux writes, they went to Chino Ranch, “six leagues from my house.” They met with John Rowland and four or five others.

Their intention was to go to Los Angeles to join the small American force that was stationed there. However, with a force of 200 men, “D[on]. Jose Ma[ria]. Flores, a military officer of the Mexican army, “a man of superior attainments and courage,” attacked the next day, September 27, and set on fire the house in which they were gathered. After an hour's struggle, they surrendered with “regret “ to avoid being burned alive. “From that moment I lost my liberty.” The prisoners were told to make “some determination of our property as well as of our families.” John Rowland expressed his desire that he would rather lose a leg than be cut off from his family. Rubidoux “remembered the poor Texans and their sufferings who went afoot from New Mexico to the Capital (Mexico City) the half of whom died on the road…” The fear was for naught.

Officer Jose Maria Flores was planning to take his prisoners to Mexico, but an opposing Mexican faction judged this would be against California interests and/or feared American reprisal, and convinced him not to march the prisoners to Mexico. The prisoners themselves paid ransom for their delivery, either to the opposing party or to Flores. “I believe in good faith, that he has during the whole period of the insurrection, acted with prudence, and that he has behaved as a good soldier…This same Flores whom I have just praised had made up his mind to send us as far as the capital of Mexico for the purpose of giving more weight to his exploits, or still better to the drafts he had issued upon the government.

General Kearny arrived “here in November or December, with an escort of 100 dragoons. The cavalry “from here, the best in all the Mexican Republic” attacked him before he got to San Diego. Over twenty of Kearny's men were killed, and as many were wounded including the General himself. Commodore Stockton joined Kearny at the head of 600 men, mostly sailors, and victoriously fought two battles on January 8 and 9, 1847. Rubidoux and companions were freed on January 10. Don Andres Pico succeeded Flores, and he asked for a treaty of peace that Colonel John C. Fremont granted “in quite an honorable manner for the sons of the country.”

Rubidoux married Guadalupe Garcie (1812-1892) in 1834 in Santa Fe. Guadalupe was from one the old aristocratic families of New Mexico. She and Louis had a large family, with at least 9 children.

Rubidoux died on 24 September 1868. He is buried in the Agua Mansa Pioneer Cemetery in Colton, California.

In November 1869, the California Silk Center Association was formed for the purpose of growing silkworms, and mulberry trees, citrus fruits, and grapes; it purchased over 4,000 acres (1,600 ha) of the Rubidoux Rancho for its enterprise.

== California Historical Landmarks ==
California Historical Landmarks at the site of his home reads:

- NO. 102 SITE OF LOUIS RUBIDOUX HOUSE - In 1844 Louis Rubidoux arrived in California with his family and, shortly thereafter, purchased the Jurupa Rancho. He became one of the most prosperous stock raisers in Southern California, and also planted orchards and vineyards, raised grain, built the first grist mill in the area, and operated a winery.
- NO. 3O3 SITE OF OLD RUBIDOUX GRIST MILL - One of the first grist mills in this part of Southern California was built by Louis Rubidoux on the Rancho Jurupa in 1846-47. Then the only mill there of its kind, it supplied a great need. Louis Rubidoux, a pioneer builder, was one of the first permanent American citizens in the valley.

== Other ==
The Louis Rubidoux Nature Center in Jurupa Valley was named in his honor; the facility was closed in 2017 and plans were underway to reopen it, until it was destroyed by a fire in October, 2019.

== See also ==
- California Historical Landmarks in Riverside County, California
