= Mahaska (Native American leader) =

Chief of the Iowa tribe (c. 1784–1834)

Mahaska White Cloud
- Maxúshga; Maxúhga
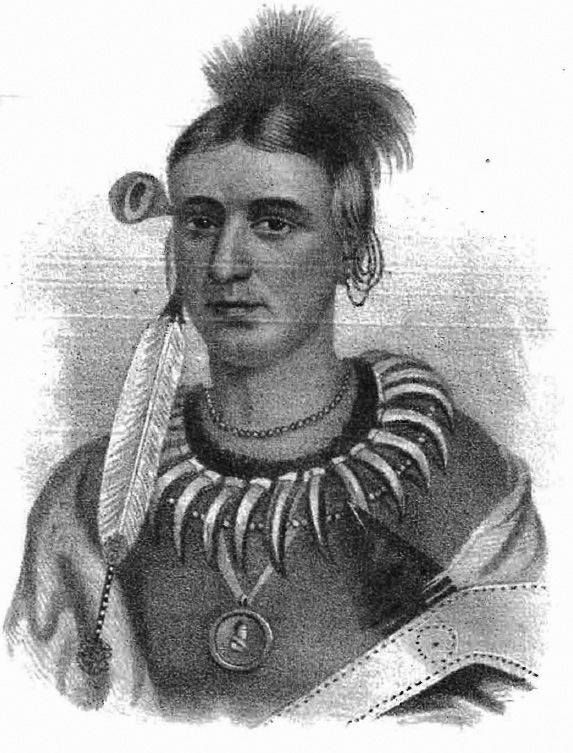
- Mahaska, from Futon's Red Men of Iowa, 1882.

Iowa tribe leader
- Succeeded by: Francis White Cloud

Personal details
- Born: c. 1784 Near present-day Burlington, Iowa, U.S.
- Died: 1834 (aged 49–50) Nodaway River, Near Massena, Iowa U.S.
- Spouse: Rantchewaime ('Female Flying Pigeon')
- Relations: Brother, No Heart (Notchimine, Nacheninga, etc.)
- Children: Francis White Cloud
- Parent(s): Father, MáHege
- Nickname: Hard Heart

Mahaska (archaic Ioway: Maxúshga, pronounced [mõxuʃꜜkɐ]; contemporary Maxúhga; c. 1784–1834), or White Cloud, was a chief of the Native American Iowa tribe. His son, also named Mahaska, was better known as Francis White Cloud.

== Early life and education ==
Mahaska was born into the Iowa tribe. His father was MáHege (also known as Mauhawgaw or Wounding Arrow). Mahaska became chief at an early age after killing several enemy Sioux to avenge his father's death by them.

Later Mahaska supposedly killed a French trader in an argument; he was arrested and imprisoned in St. Louis, Missouri. After he escaped, he led a raid against the Osage.

Afterward, he decided that his father's death was finally avenged. Mahaska lay down his arms and adopted the lifestyle of the European-American settlers, building a log home and farming. He refused to let his braves avenge the death of an Iowa chief named Crane at the hands of Omaha Indians in 1833. When several Iowa killed six Omaha warriors, Mahaska assisted in their arrest.

The next year one of the Iowa escaped from Fort Leavenworth and killed Mahaska by shooting him in the back as he sat by his campfire. He was buried along the Nodaway River in Edna Township, Cass County, Iowa. Mahaska became a symbol to settlers of the virtues of his native lifestyle, and of the possibility of peace between natives and settlers.

== Legacy and honors ==
- Mahaska County, Iowa was named for him.
- USS Mahaska was named in his honor.

Sculptor Sherry Edmundson Fry's earliest public commission was a bronze statue of Mahaska. Recently restored, it still stands on its pedestal in the courthouse square of Oskaloosa, which is the governmental seat of Mahaska County, Iowa, in the southeastern section of the state. At the right of the base is the artist's signature "S.E. Fry, 1907".

When he accepted the Mahaska commission in 1906, Fry was living in Paris. He returned to Iowa the following summer to make preparatory drawings of Meskwaki at the nearby Settlement at Tama, Iowa, and to collect Indian artifacts and other reference materials. Returning to Paris, he began on a clay scale model, which he first showed at the Paris Salon in 1907. A year later, he exhibited the final full-sized sculpture, for which he was awarded the Rome Prize. Soon after, it was shipped to the U.S., and arrived in Oskaloosa by railroad. The formal dedication of the statue, which was attended by "a crowd of 12,000 rain-soaked spectators", was held on May 12, 1909.
