= Joseph Robidoux IV =

American fur trader and settler (1783–1868)

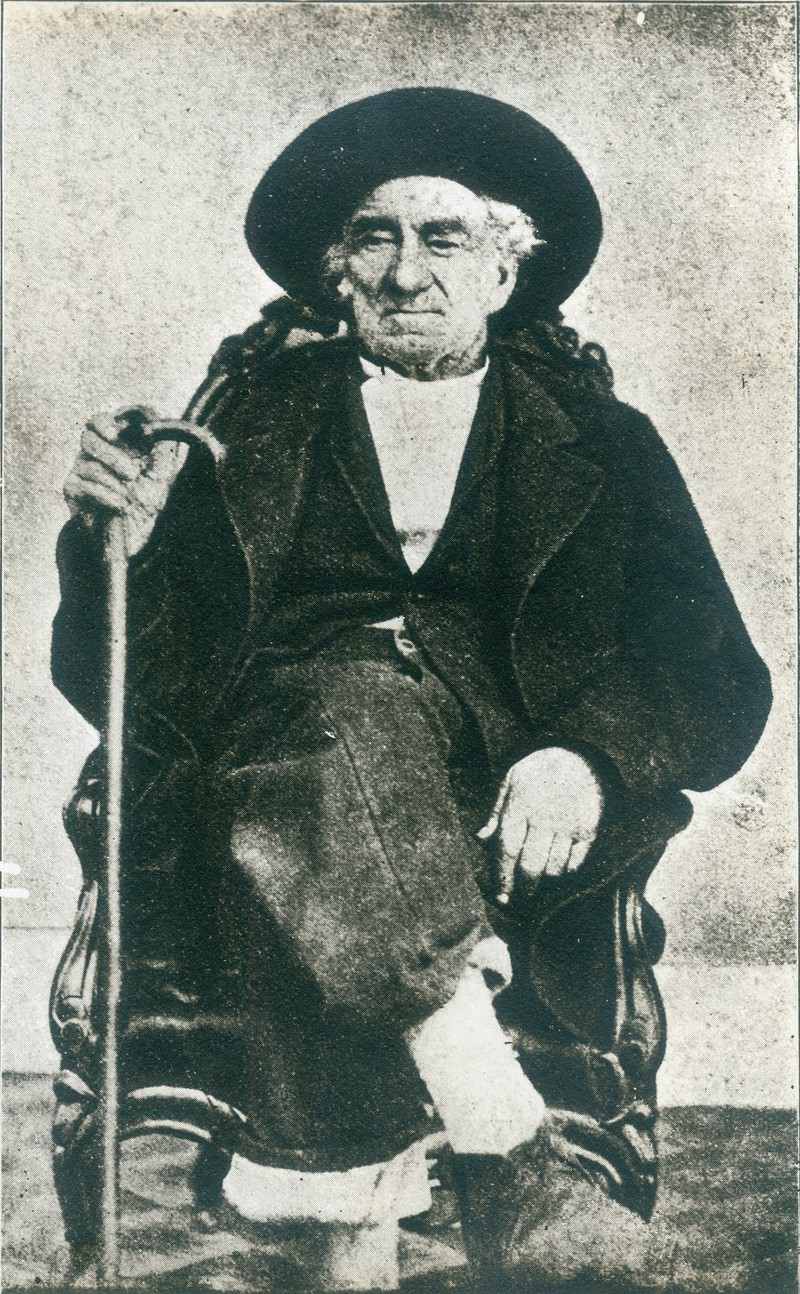

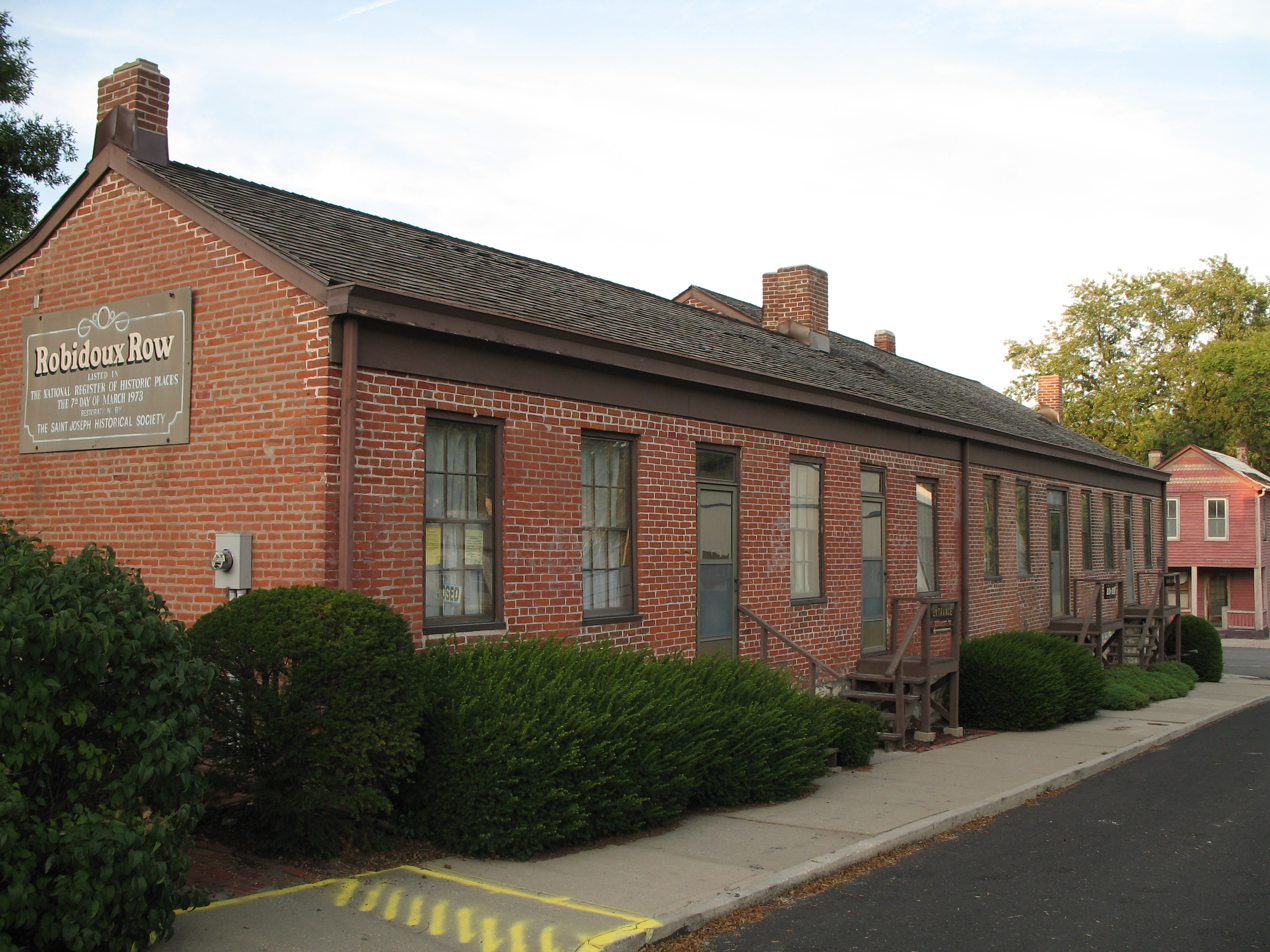
Robidoux Row, St. Joseph, Missouri

Joseph Robidoux IV (1783–1868), was an American fur trader credited as the founder of St. Joseph, Missouri, which developed around his Blacksnake Hills Trading Post. His buildings in St. Joseph, known as Robidoux Row, are listed on the National Register of Historic Places. Of French Canadian descent, he was born in St. Louis, as were his mother and most of his brothers, when it was a predominately French-speaking colonial town.

After he established his trading post on the Missouri River, it (and the later St. Joseph), became a center for his family enterprise of fur trading. He operated it with his five brothers along the Mississippi and especially the Missouri River systems.

== Biography ==
Robidoux was the oldest of the six sons of Joseph Robidoux III (born in Sault-au-Recollet, Montreal, 12 February 1750-, date of death unknown), a fur trader, and Catherine Rollet (born in St. Louis, Missouri, October 20, 1767; died in 1868). Joseph Robidoux IV was born August 5, 1783, in Saint Louis, as were the six of his seven brothers who survived to adulthood. This was before it was acquired by the United States as part of the 1803 Louisiana Purchase of French territory west of the Mississippi River.

Joseph Robidoux IV was the grandson of Joseph Robidoux II (b. 13 September 1722 • Montreal, St-Laurent-de-l'Île-d'Orléans, L'Île-d'Orléans, Quebec, Canada) and Marie-Anne Leblanc (b. 13 January 1728 • Île-Dorléans, Montmorency, Quebec, Canada). He grew up in St. Louis, Missouri, where his father introduced him and his brothers Francois, Pierre Isidore, Antoine, Louis, and Michael to the family business of fur trading at an early age. (Weber, pg. 36)

In 1799, at the age of 16, Joseph began accompanying fur traders to the upper Missouri River, where they traded with a variety of Native American tribes.

== Career ==
=== 1803–1822 ===
In 1803, Robidoux was sent by his father to organize a trading post at Fort Dearborn, the site of present-day Chicago. His early success there annoyed other traders, who engaged Indians to harass the young man and drive him from the area. During this time he fell in love with the daughter of the village blacksmith. The father did not give permission for his daughter to marry Robidoux, purportedly saying that some of the Robidoux family had surrendered their soul to the devil.

In 1805, Joseph's wife of four years, Eugénie Delisle, died. She and Joseph had had two children, a daughter, Messanie, who preceded her mother in death, and a son, Joseph F. Robidoux. Later using the given name of Joseph, he also became a trader.

In 1809, the senior Robidoux established a trading post near the site of present-day North Omaha, Nebraska. He operated his trading post in the Council Bluffs area until 1822, when the American Fur Company bought him out and offered him $1,000 a year to refrain from competing with them. A later post at the North Omaha site was operated by and named for Jean Pierre Cabanné. During the years of the War of 1812 and hostilities with British forces along the northern frontier, the Robidoux brothers had to pull their activities back to the St. Louis area.

In 1813, the widower Robidoux married Angélique Vaudry. They had seven children together: six sons and one daughter (Faraon, Julius, Francis, Felix, Edmond, Charles, and Sylvanie).

== 1823–1842 ==
After Robidoux returned to St. Louis about 1823, he worked as a baker and confectioner. In 1826, he was hired by the American Fur Company to establish a trading post at the Blacksnake Hills (near the site on the Missouri River of present-day Saint Joseph, Missouri.) He remained their employee for four years, at the salary of $1,800 a year, before becoming an independent trader.

Built prior to 1830, Robidoux's home was located on the northwest corner of 2nd & Jules streets in Saint Joseph. It was the first building in the settlement. The house was later removed to Krug Park as a historic attraction.

Robidoux prospered in the years between 1830 and 1843, employing as many as 20 ethnic French men to engage in trade with the Native Americans to the west of his post. When Missouri entered the union in 1821, the state's western boundary was based on the Kaw River mouth in the Kansas City West Bottoms (approximately 94 degrees 36 minutes West longitude). The land where St. Joseph is now located belonged by treaty to the Iowa and the combined Sauk and Meskwaki tribe. As a licensed trader, Robidoux was legally allowed to be in the area as a trader.

Robidoux was the most spectacular example of several enterprising white settlers who encroached on Indian land. Faced with the possibilities of more encroachment, the tribes in 1836 agreed to sell what is now the northwest corner of Missouri for $7,500 to the federal government in a deal at Fort Leavenworth, Kansas. It was presided over by William Clark (one of the leaders of the Lewis and Clark expedition). The transaction, called the Platte Purchase, added an area almost the combined size of Rhode Island and Delaware to the State of Missouri.

During this era, one of Robidoux's African-American slaves, Jeffrey Deroine, sued for his freedom, claiming abuse by Robidoux. Deroine lost the case, but his friends later purchased his freedom. Deroine rose to prominence for his skills as a trader and linguist, becoming a well-known U.S. Government translator and diplomat.

=== 1843–1868 ===
In 1843, Robidoux hired Frederick W. Smith and Simeon Kemper to design a town for him on his land around the trading post. Under Kemper's plan the town was to have been called Robidoux, a feature Kemper thought would appeal to the trader. But, Robidoux preferred Smith's plan, as it featured more narrow streets, thus leaving more land for him to sell in the form of lots.

Plans for the town were filed with the clerk of Common Pleas in St. Louis on July 26, 1843. Shortly thereafter, Robidoux began selling lots, with corner lots going for $150.00 and interior lots $100.00.

Saint Joseph prospered quickly in the years after its founding, growing from a population of 800 in 1846 to 8,932 in 1860. Joseph Robidoux remained a prominent citizen. His early trading offices are known as Robidoux Row; the complex is listed in the National Register of Historic Places. He led many development issues until his death, at the age of 85, in 1868. Present-day Saint Joseph retains the downtown streets which he named for his children and his second wife Angélique.

== Family ==
Joseph was married three times. His first wife was Eugénie DeLisle (1704–1805?), who was also ethnic French. Joseph and Eugenie had two children:

- Messanie (died early)
- Joseph (b. 1802)

Secondly, Joseph married a Native American woman when he operated a trading post at Scott's Bluff from 1849-1851. She may have been Shoshone. The couple had one child:

- Mary Many Days (1805–1884). She married Ioway chief Francis White Cloud. Robidoux was grandfather to James White Cloud and Jefferson White Cloud, who were later named as Ioway chiefs as adults.

The widowed Robidoux married again. His third wife was Angélique Vaudry, great-granddaughter of Jean-Baptiste Chevalier, one of the early founders of Fort Michilimackinac. The couple had six children who lived to adulthood:

- Messanie (13 Aug 1814 – 14 Aug 1814)
- Farron Antoine (Faraon) (3 March 1816 – 1840)
- François Belvedere (b. 25 February 1818)
- Felix (5 May 1820 – 1873)
- Edmond Valentine (12 May 1825)
- Sylvanie (10 March 1827)
- Charles (10 July 1831 – 1851).

Robidoux had two illegitimate children with Angeline Caroline Jones. Joseph Henry Robidoux Papst was born in St. Joseph, Missouri in 1853 and Madora Rubidoux Papst was born in 1855.

Robidoux died on 27 May 1868, and was buried at the Calvary Cemetery in St. Joseph. His body was relocated to the Mount Olivet Cemetery in 1908 after the original cemetery was abandoned. Losing money to gambling, he did not die a rich man.

== Legacy and honors ==
- He is the namesake of Roubidoux Creek, a stream in Missouri.
- St. Joseph, Missouri was named for him, the founder.
- His buildings known as Robidoux Row, were listed on the National Register of Historic Places.

== See also ==
- Cabanne's Trading Post
- Robidoux family
