= California Silk Center Association =

Short-lived company

The California Silk Center Association was a short-lived 19th century company in the U.S. state of California which encouraged silk culture. It founded what is now the city of Riverside, California. The association was established in November 1869 in Los Angeles, but after the death of its president and only expert in sericulture, Frenchman Louis Provost, in 1870, the silk-growing scheme was abandoned. By then the superintendent of the company had purchased about 5,500 acres (2,200 ha) in the vicinity of Rubidoux Rancho, with a further expansion of 3,169 acres (1,282 ha) already arranged. A number of mulberry trees had been planted to provide nourishment for the silkworms.

== Background ==
To encourage silk culture in California, the Legislature, in 1865–1866 (another source states 1867), passed an act giving a bounty of $250 for every plantation of 5,000 mulberry trees two years old, and one of $300 for every 100,000 merchantable cocoons produced. This greatly encouraged the planting of trees and the production of cocoons.

== History ==
The California Silk Center Association was formed with a large capital on paper. The association bought 4,000 acres (1,600 ha) which now form part of Riverside. It was the intention of the association to found a colony there of silk growers and silk weavers. Sixty families were reported ready to locate on the colony grounds as soon as negotiations were completed. Prevost, the leader of the group, died shortly after the purchase was made, and the colony project died later. At first, the profits from the seri-culture fad were large, not, however, from the manufacture of silk, but from the sale of silkworm eggs. When the industry was launched, eggs sold at ten dollars an ounce and the worms were good layers. One seri-culturist reported a net profit of US$1,000 an acre made in sixty days from the sale of eggs. Another realized US$1,260 an acre in a single season. The net profits from his three acres of trees and cocoons exceeded the net profit on his neighbor's 10,000 acres of grain. With such immense returns from such small investments, it is not strange that the sericulture craze became epidemic. Mulberry plantations multiplied until the bounties paid threatened the state treasury with bankruptcy; in 1867 or 1868, the law was repealed. Out of the hundreds of thousands of bounty-bought cocoons, only one piece of silk was known to be manufactured, and that was a flag for the State Capitol. Counting bounties paid and labor lost on a non-producing industry, indirectly that flag cost the people of the commonwealth not less than US$250,000.

The dry year of 1869-70 prevented the planting of mulberry plantations. A writer in the Overland Monthly of 1869 noted: "It is almost startling to think that from a calling so apparently insignificant we may be able to realize in a short time a larger sum and infinitely greater gains than from one-half of all our other agricultural productions in the State." Prevost died in April 1870. With the increased supply, the price of eggs declined until it was all supply and no demand. Then the seri-culture epidemic came to as sudden a stop. The worms died of starvation and the bounty-bought mulberry plantations perished from neglect. Of the millions of trees planted, all died. The Silk Center Association sold its land holdings to Judge John W. North's Riverside Colony. The experiment failed, but not because California was unsuited to silk culture. The defects were in the seri-culturists, not in the soil or climate of the State. There was no concert of action among the producers. They were scattered from Siskiyou to San Diego. There were not enough producers in any one place to build a factory, and not enough weavers in the country to manufacture the raw silk produced; nor could capital be induced to invest in silk factories.

== See also ==
- Sericulture
- Silk production
