= Joseph Robidoux III =

American fur trapper (1750–1809)

Joseph Robidoux III (12 February 1750 – 16 March 1809), son of Joseph Robidoux II and Marie Anne Le Blanc, and was an early fur trader in Missouri and Nebraska. He and his sons had a long relationship with the American Fur Company, founded by John Jacob Astor. Joseph was born in Sault-au-Récollet (now part of Montreal), Quebec, Canada, and relocated to St. Louis with his parents when he was 10, traveling via the Chicago Portage.

Joseph established a number of establishments, engaging in trade with anyone offering items of value. In the later 18th and early 19th centuries, St. Louis was a major trading hub with both the Indians and Western settlers. Frequently changing hands among the British, French and Spanish, the rules were often confusing, and Joseph managed to be on many sides of an issue. As an example, in his last letter before his tragic suicide, Meriwether Lewis wrote to Thomas Jefferson:

On my way to St. Louis, last fall, I received satisfactory evidence that a Mr. Robideau [sic], an inhabitant of St. Louis, had, the preceding winter, during intercourse with the Ottoes and Missouris, been guilty of the most flagrant breaches of the first of those misdemeanors above mentioned ... And Mr. Robidoux and sons still prosecute their trade."

On 21 September 1782, Joseph married Catherine Marie Rollet (1767-1798). Joseph and Catherine had nine children, eight of which lived to adulthood:

- Joseph IV (1783-1868), known as the Founder for his role in the establishment of St. Joseph, Missouri
- François (1788-1856) an early explorer of California
- Pierre Isadore (1791-1852)
- Antoine (1794-1860), an early settler of Santa Fe, New Mexico
- Louis (1796-1868), founder of Riverside, California
- Michael (1798-1858)
- Eulalie (1800-1818)
- Marie Pelagie (1800-1872).

Joseph died in St. Louis in 1809.

== Sources ==
- Willoughby, Robert J., The Brothers Robidoux and the Opening of the American West, University of Missouri Press, Columbia, 2012
- Lewis, Hugh M., Robidoux Chronicicles, French-Indian Etnoculture of the Trans-Mississippi West, Trafford, Canada, 2004
- Thwaites, Reuben Gold (ed.), Original Journals of the Lewis & Clark Expedition, 1804-1806, Arno Press, New York, 1969
- Genealogical Dictionary of Canadian Families, 1608-1890, Tanguay Collection
