= Iowa people =

Native American tribe

Iowa Báxoje
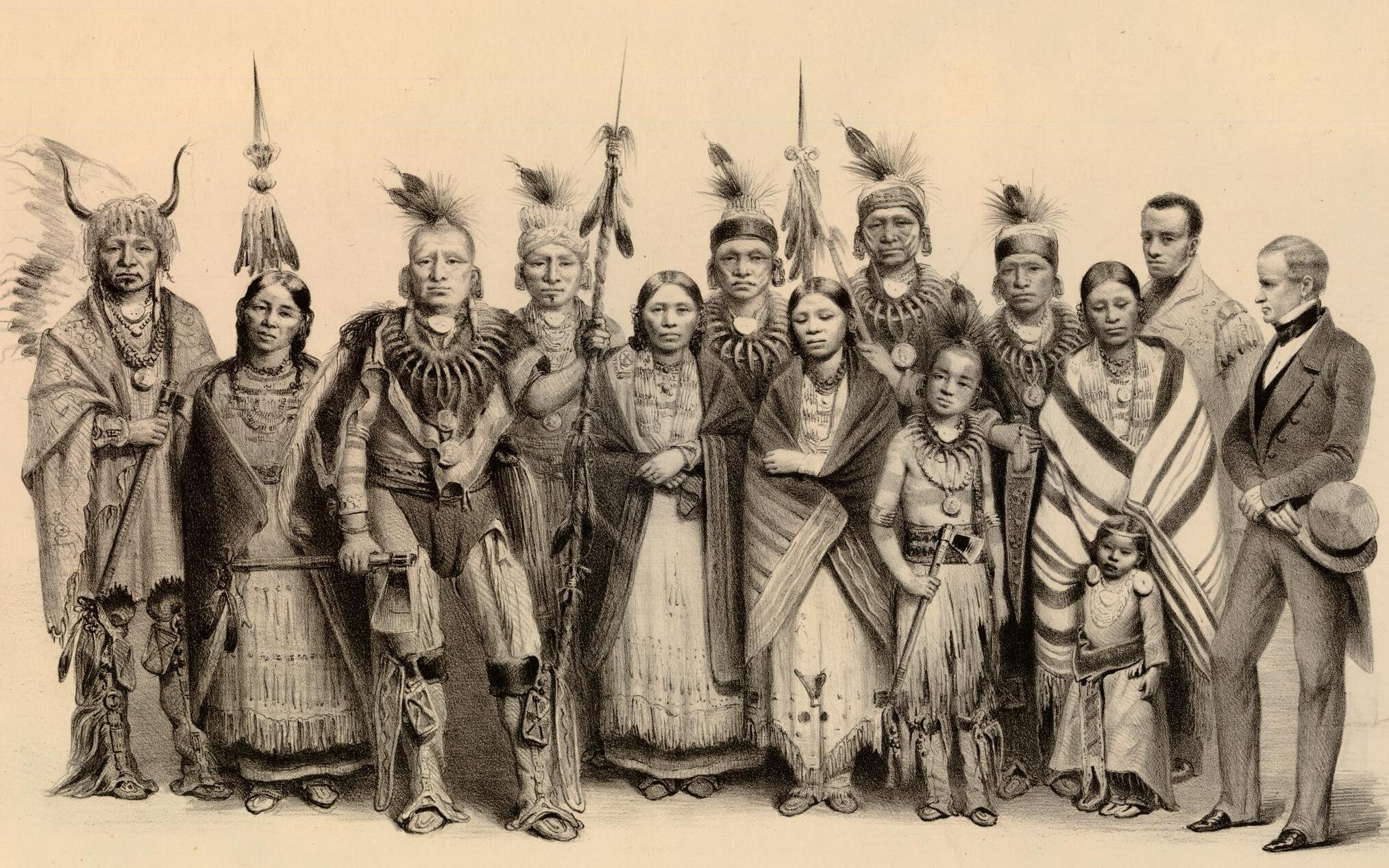
- Lithograph of Iowa delegate made while they were visiting Paris in 1845

Total population
- estimated 2,567

Regions with significant populations
- United States (Kansas, Nebraska, and Oklahoma)

Languages
- English, formerly Chiwere

Religion
- Indigenous religion, Native American Church, Christianity

Related ethnic groups
- Otoe, Missouria and Ho-Chunk

- People: Báxoje
- Language: Báxoje ich'é, Hand Talk
- Country: Báxoje Máyaⁿ

The Iowa, also known as Ioway or Báxoje (Iowa-Oto: Báxoje ich'é, lit. 'grey snow people'), are a Native American tribe. Historically, they spoke Chiwere, which was a Siouan-Catawban language. Today, they are enrolled in either of two federally recognized tribes: the Iowa Tribe of Oklahoma and the Iowa Tribe of Kansas and Nebraska.

The Iowa, Missouria, and Otoe tribes were all once part of the Ho-Chunk people and were all Chiwere language speakers. They left their ancestral homelands in Southern Wisconsin for Eastern Iowa, a state that bears their name.

In 1837, the Iowa were moved from Iowa to reservations in Brown County, Kansas, and Richardson County, Nebraska. Bands of Iowa were forced into Indian Territory in the late 19th century and settled south of Perkins, Oklahoma, to become the Iowa Tribe of Oklahoma.

== Etymology ==
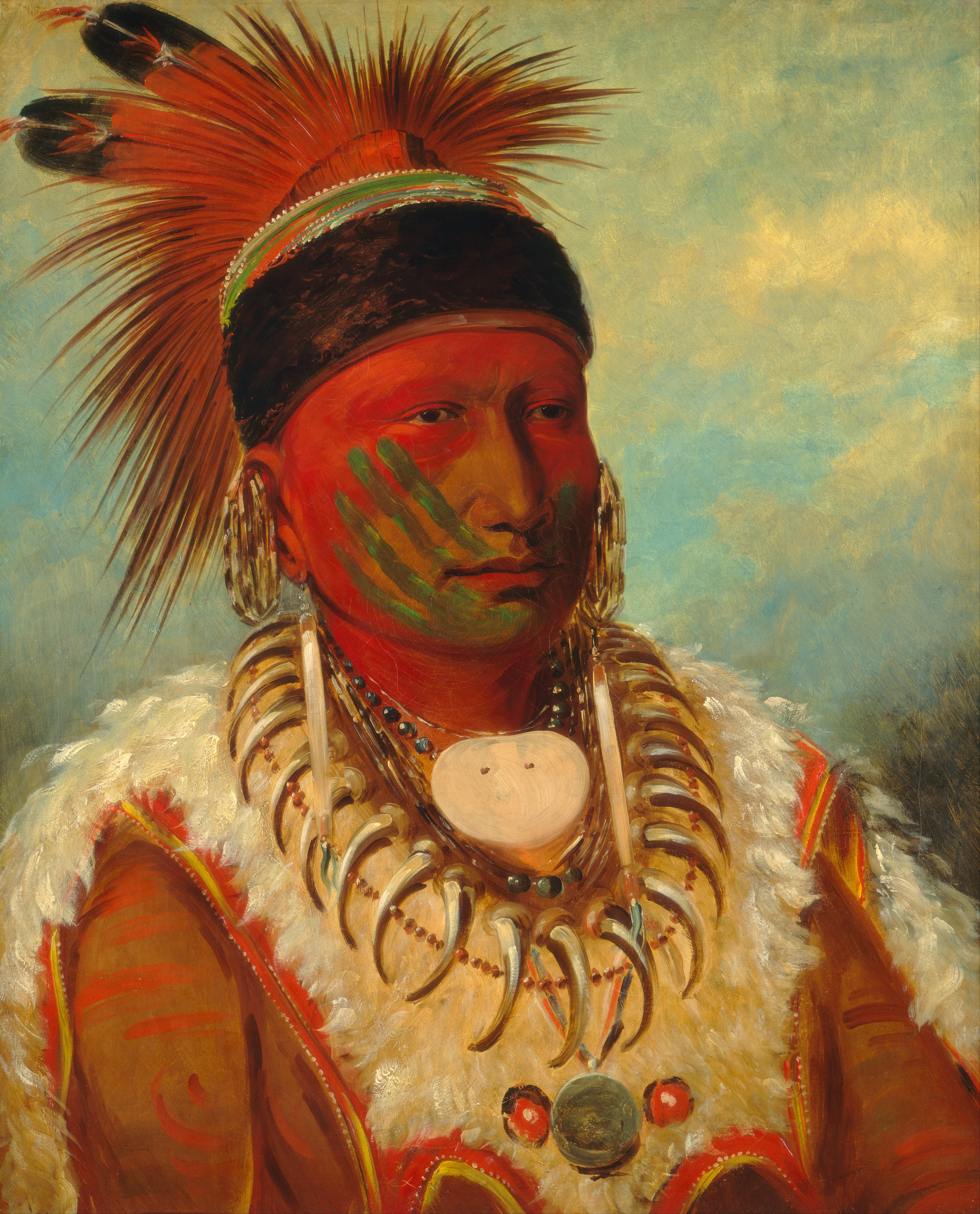
White Cloud, Chief of the Iowa, by George Catlin (1845), National Gallery of Art

The Ioway call themselves the Báxoje (pronounced [b̥aꜜxodʒɛ]; alternate spellings: pahotcha, pahucha, Bah-Kho-Je), which translates to 'grey snow'. Báxoje has been incorrectly translated as "dusted faces" or "dusty nose". The name Iowa has been said to come from the Sioux ayuhwa ("sleepy ones."). Early European explorers often adopted the names of tribes from the ethnonyms which other tribes gave them, not understanding that these differed from what the peoples called themselves. Thus, ayuhwa is not an Ioway word. The word Ioway comes from Dakota ayuxbe via French aiouez.

The state of Iowa, where they once lived, was named after this tribe. Their name has been applied to other locations, such as Iowa County, Iowa City and the Iowa River.

== Population ==
Their estimated 1760 population of 1,100 dropped to 800 and by 1804, a decrease caused mainly by smallpox, to which they had no natural immunity. Their numbers were reduced to 500 by 1900. In 1960, 100 Iowa lived in Kansas and 100 in Oklahoma.

By 1980 their population had recovered to 1,000 (of which only 20 spoke Iowa). In 1990 there were 1,700 people. According to the Bureau of Indian Affairs, in 1995 there were 533 individuals living in the Iowa reservations of Kansas and 44 in Nebraska (Horton Agency), while 857 people lived in the Oklahoma Iowa Tribe (Shawnee Agency), amounting to a total of 2,934 people. According to the 2000 census, 1,451 people identified as full-blood Iowa, 76 were of mixed-Indian descent, 688 of mixed-race descent, and 43 of mixed-race and tribe descent, amounting to 2,258 people.

== Culture ==
Iowa.

The Iowa have had customs similar to those of the other tribes of the Great Plains, such as the Omaha, Ponca and Osage. They were a semi-nomadic people who had adopted horses for hunting, but they also had an agricultural lifestyle similar to the tribes inhabiting the Eastern woodlands. They planted maize and manufactured alum pipes, which they traded along with furs with the French colonizers.

Historically, their houses included bark lodges (chakiruthan), tipis, and at times, earth lodges—oven-shaped buildings covered with earth for protection from extremes of temperature and oriented to a cardinal direction. A smoke hole enabled ventilation from a central hearth. During the hunting season or in warfare, they used the portable tipi. Like the Osage or Kansa, Iowa men traditionally shaved their heads and decorated them with deer hide. Like Great Plains tribes, they valued three feats during a battle.

== History ==
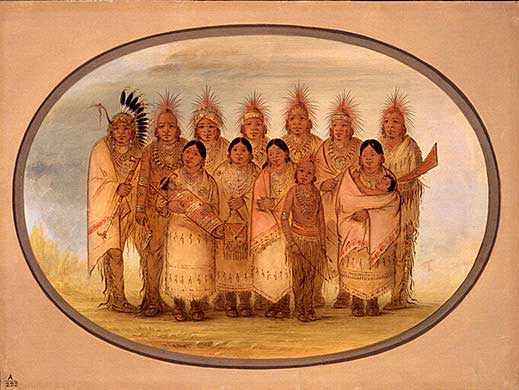
Iowa Indians in London and París, by Catlin (1861), National Gallery of Art

In precontact times, the Iowa emigrated from the Great Lakes region to present-day Iowa. In the 16th century, they moved from the Mississippi River to the Great Plains, and possibly then separated from the Ho-Chunk tribe.

From the 15th to 18th centuries, they lived in the Red Pipestone Quarry region (Minnesota). In the early 19th century, the Iowa had reached the banks of the Platte River, where in 1804 Lewis and Clark visited their settlements. There they engaged in trading with the French and local tribes, thanks to their advantageous situation regarding the alum deposits.

Between 1820 and 1840, the Iowa ceded their Minnesota, Iowa and Missouri lands to the U.S. government. By 1837 most were relocated to a reservation along the Kansas-Nebraska border, led by their chief Chief Mahaska ('White Cloud'; archaic Ioway Maxúshga, pronounced [mõxuʃꜜkɐ]; contemporary Maxúhga). They surrendered the Little Platte territory in Missouri in 1836. Other Missouri lands had been ceded in 1824.

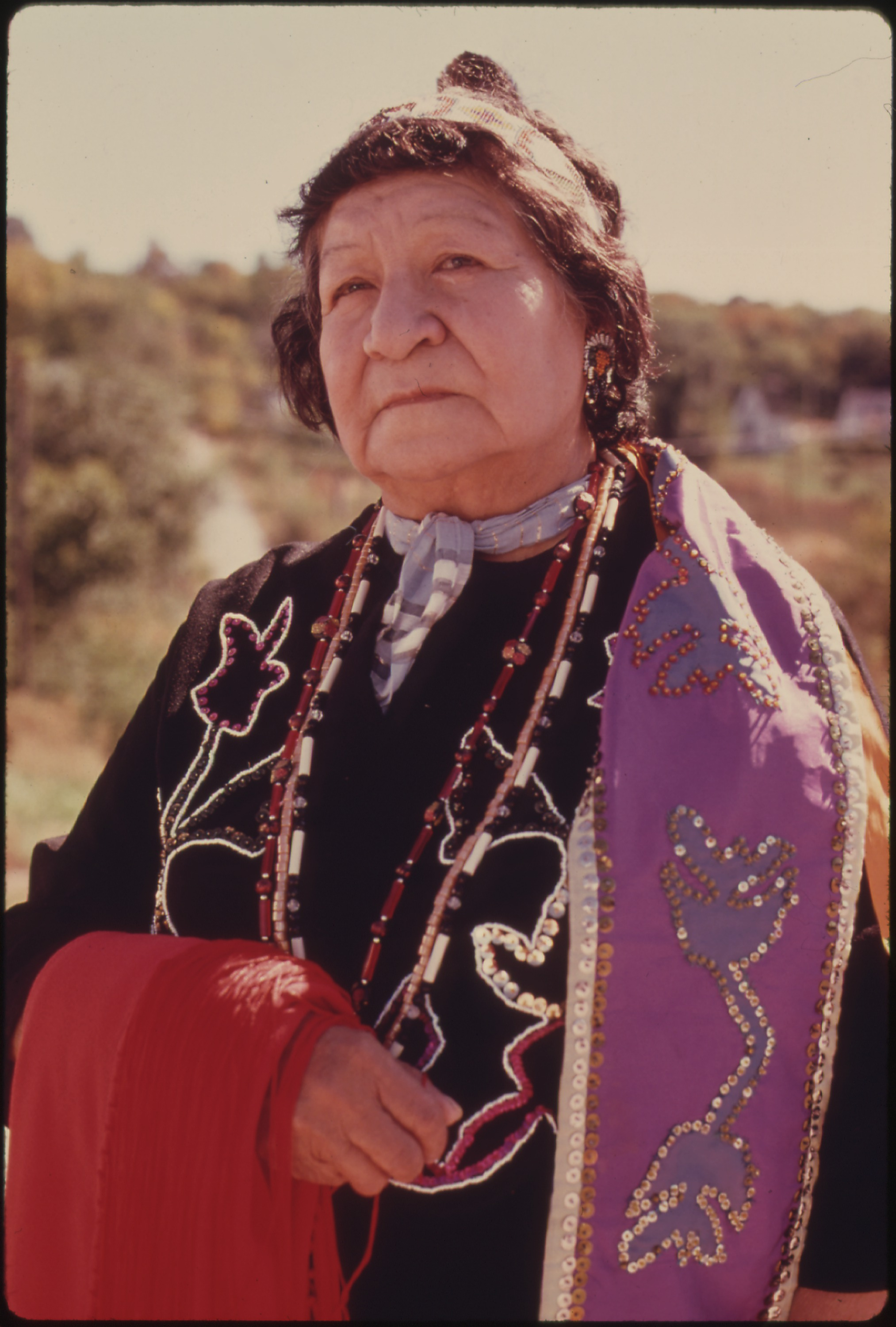
Mary Louise White Cloud Rhodd, granddaughter of Chief James White Cloud, in Iowa regalia, White Cloud, Kansas, 1974

In 1837 they settled in a strip of land in Kansas, south of the Big Nemaha River, along with the Sauk and the Meskwaki, tribes with which they had long had friendly relations (though speaking unrelated Algonquian languages). Some 45 Iowa fought in the American Civil War in the Union Army, among them Chief James White Cloud, grandson of Mahaska.

In 1883 a number of Iowa moved to Indian Territory preferring to live in the older community village way of life. The new reservation was located in Lincoln, Payne and Logan counties in the Indian Territory. However, despite their efforts to block allotment, their lands were divided anyway. Today the Iowa Reservation in Nebraska and Kansas is approximately 2,100 acres (8.5 km^{2}) in size, and has more than 150 residents.

=== 21st-century ===
In 2007, a documentary film Lost Nation: The Ioway (2007; written and directed by Kelly Rundle and Tammy Rundle) was made, and followed by sequels 2 and 3.

The Ioway Tribe of Kansas and Nebraska operates the Casino White Cloud at White Cloud, Kansas, on the Ioway Reservation.

Jacob Keyes is the current tribal chairperson of the Iowa Tribe of Oklahoma. The tribes operates the Cimarron Casino in Perkins, Oklahoma, and the Ioway Casino in Chandler, Oklahoma.

== Notable historical Iowa people ==
- Big Neck
- Marie Aioe Dorion
- Chief Mahaska

== See also ==
- Native American tribes in Nebraska
