= Grand Terrace =

- Grand Terrace may refer to:
- Grand Terrace, California
- Grand Terrace Cafe, a historic Chicago jazz club often referred to as simply Grand Terrace
- Grand Terrace, a never completed project on the Cornell West Campus that was designed by Frederick Law Olmsted

== See also ==
- Grand Terrace High School
