= Cornelius Jensen =

Danish sea captain and California politician (1814–1886)

Cornelius Boy Jensen
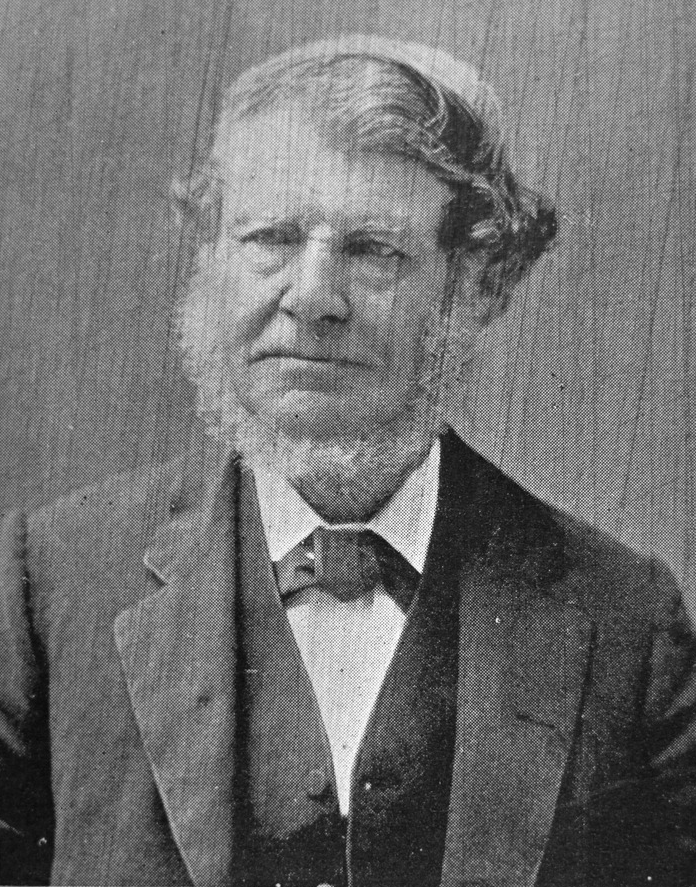
- Born: September 29, 1814; Sylt, Denmark
- Died: December 12, 1886 (aged 72)
- Title: Member of the San Bernardino County Board of Supervisors
- Term: Held nine 1-year terms from 1856 to 1877
- Spouse: Mercedes Alvarado
- Children: 12

Cornelius Boy Jensen (September 29, 1814 – December 12, 1886) was a Danish sea captain and Californian politician. Of the nine one-year terms that he served as county supervisor between 1856 and 1877, Jensen was the chairman of the San Bernardino County Board of Supervisors four times. His Agua Mansa home, the Jensen Alvarado Ranch, is a registered California Historical Landmark (No. 943) and is listed on the National Register of Historic Places.

== Early years ==
Jensen was born on the North Frisian island of Sylt off the coast of Southern Schleswig (then part of Denmark, now in Germany) in either 1812 or 1814. He took his mate's examination in Denmark and thereafter made several trips around Cape Horn, arriving in California by 1844.

== Biography ==
Jensen was captain of his own vessel for 20 years. He arrived in San Francisco in 1848. With news of the California Gold Rush, his crew jumped ship and, thereafter, he went to Sacramento and opened a store, selling items to the gold miners. It was there that he met the Californio Ignacio Alvarado. At Alvarado's urging Jensen moved to Southern California, settling in Agua Mansa around 1854. At the age of 40, he married Alvarado's 16-year-old sister, (Note: Though the reference states that Mercedes was Ignacio's daughter, genealogical records show Ignacio (or Ygnacio) to be her brother.) Mercedes Alvarado (c. 1848–1914) at Mission San Gabriel in 1853. Her parents were Francisco and Juana Maria (Avila) Alvarado.

Jensen had several careers after his early years as a sea captain. In addition to being a rancher and vintner on his Southern California properties, he owned a sawmill and a store, and served as a politician.

== Personal life ==
After the Great Flood of 1862 destroyed much of the town of Agua Mansa, Jensen and his wife built a home on hundreds of acres on what was to become the Cornelius and Mercedes Jensen Ranch, a California Historical Landmark, located at the Jensen-Alvarado Ranch Historic Park and Museum. Their brick home, the oldest non-adobe structure in the Inland Empire, was Riverside County's first kiln-fired brick building.

Of their twelve children, ten survived into adulthood. His oldest son was Jose (born 1855) who made a career as a deputy assessor, judge of elections, and member of the board of education. Henry (born 1867) was a member of the school board. Their son John, who married Emily Crowder, built a wood-framed home that was subsequently moved to the Jensen-Alvarado Historic Ranch and Museum, serving as the caretaker's home. Jensen spoke fluent German, Spanish and English. Considered the richest man in the area when he died in 1886, Jensen is buried at the Agua Mansa Cemetery near Colton, California.

Mercedes’ sister, Delores, married Fenton Slaughter who also sat on the San Bernardino County Board of Supervisors. Jensen's cousin, Peter Peters, who also hailed from Sylt, married Mercedes’ other sister, Refugio; Peters served on the local school board and was a trustee of the Agua Mansa Pioneer Cemetery.
