= La Loma Hills =

Californian mountain range

- Location within California Location within the United States

Highest point
- Elevation: 1,214 ft (370 m)

Geography
- Country: United States
- State: California
- Region: Peninsular Ranges
- District: San Bernardino County
- Range coordinates: 34°2′3.050″N 117°20′45.160″W
- Topo map: USGS San Bernardino South

The La Loma Hills are a low and short mountain range of the Peninsular Ranges System, in the urban Inland Empire region of Southern California, United States.

== Geography ==
The hills are located in extreme southwestern San Bernardino County, north of the city of Riverside and the Riverside County line.

The Santa Ana River course is naturally redirected in a right angle to the west by the La Loma Hills, flowing along their northern side and then returning south again along their western sides.

The community of Highgrove is on the southeast; Interstate 215, community of Grand Terrace, and the Kalmia Hills are on the east; and the city of Colton is across the river to the northeast.

Geologically, they are part of the Northern Perris Block, the central block of three major fault-bounded blocks of the northern part of the Peninsular Ranges. The San Jacinto Fault Zone is to the northeast.

== See also ==
- Mountain ranges of San Bernardino County, California
- Natural history of the Peninsular Ranges
