= Reche Summit =

Mountain Peak

Coordinates: 33°59′22″N 117°14′51″W

Reche Summit, at an elevation of 3,017 feet (945 meters), the tallest peak of the range of mountains trending northwest to southeast south of Reche Canyon, in Riverside County, California. These include Blue Mountain to its northwest and to the southeast, Olive Summit and the Kalmia Hills. It has an isolation of 10.86 mi (17.47 km).
