= Bloomington High School (California) =

Location
- 10750 Laurel Street; Bloomington, California 92316-2599; United States; 34°03′30″N 117°24′52″W

Information
- Opened: 1962
- School district: Colton Joint Unified School District
- Principal: Sandy Torres
- Teaching staff: 95.23 (FTE)
- Enrollment: 1,864 (2023-2024)
- Student to teacher ratio: 19.57
- Colors: Blue & gold
- Athletics conference: CIF Southern Section; Sunkist League
- Nickname: Bruins
- Website: School website

Bloomington High School is a high school in unincorporated Bloomington, California, near Riverside, Rialto, San Bernardino, and Fontana.

== History ==
The school was established in 1962 for a student population of 900. As of 2024, the number of students was around 2,200. It belongs to the Colton Joint Unified School District. The school mascot is a Bruin which is a type of young bear. A new football field was purchased in 2003–04. The school has put in new Math and Science wings and has been open since 10 October 2011.

== Notable alumni ==
- Charlyne Yi, actor
- Charles Lewis, Jr. aka Mask, founder Tapout clothing company, & UFC Hall of Famer

== Sports ==
=== CIF Southern Section championships ===
- Football: 1994 CIF Southern Section, Division VIII Champions.
- Football: 1996 CIF Southern Section, Division VII Champions.
- Football: 1997 CIF Southern Section, Division VII Champions.
- Football: 1998 CIF Southern Section, Division VIII Champions.
- Football: 1999 CIF Southern Section, Division VIII Champions.
- Wrestling: 2010 CIF Southern Section, Division 6 Dual-Meet Champions.
- Wrestling: 2011 CIF Southern Section, Division 5 Dual-Meet Champions.
- Wrestling: 2012 CIF Southern Section, Division 5 Dual-Meet Champions.
- Wrestling: 2013 CIF Southern Section, Division 4 Dual-Meet Champions.
- Wrestling: 2014 CIF Southern Section, Division 4 Dual-Meet Champions.
- Girls Soccer: 2020 CIF Southern Section, Division 6 Champions.

=== National Rankings ===
- #19 All-time Football Season Score: 1994 - 880 Points
- Tied-#3 All-time One Half Football Score: 1994 - 84 Points
- #9 All-time Football Score Per Game: 1994 - 62.9 Points/Game
- #13 All-time Football Rushing Yards per Season: 1996 - 5,813 Yards
- #15 All-time Football Rushing Yards per Season: 1994 - 5,622 Yards
- #16 All-time Football Rushing Yards per Season: 1998 - 5,555 Yards

=== California State Scoring Record ===
- Football Scoring Record: 1994-2014 - 880 Points
- Football One Half Scoring Record: 1994 - 84 Points
- Football Score Per Game: 1994 - 62.9 Points/Game

=== CIF Southern Section Records ===
- Football Scoring Record: 1994 - 880 Points
- Football Most Points in a Half Record: 1995 - 84 Points
- Football Most Rushing Yards in a Season Record: 1996 - 5,813 yards

=== CIF Southern Section Top 10 ===
- Football Most Points in a Season: 1997 - 774 Points
- Football Most Points in a Season: 1996 - 724 Points
- Football Most Points in a Game: 1994 - 144 Points
- Football Most Rushing Yards in a Season: 1994 - 5,622 yards
- Football Most Rushing Yards in a Season: 1998 - 5,555 yards
- Football Most Rushing Yards in a Game: 1996 - 675 yards
