= Willets =

Willets may refer to:

== People ==
- William Willets Cocks (1861–1932), American politician from New York
- Willets Outerbridge, sailor from the United States, who represented his country at the 1928 Summer Olympics in Amsterdam, Netherlands
- Karl Willets of Bolt Thrower, a British death metal band from Coventry, England
- Anita Willets-Burnham, American Impressionist artist, teacher at the School of the Art Institute of Chicago, author, and lecturer

== Places ==
- Willets, New York, in the Town of Ledyard
- Willets, North Carolina, unincorporated community in Jackson County, North Carolina, United States
- Willets Point, Queens, known locally as the Iron Triangle, an industrial neighborhood within Corona in the New York City borough of Queens

== See also ==
- Willet
- Willetts
- Willet's Department Store (defunct), Colton, California
