= Pigeon Pass Valley =

Valley in California, United States

Pigeon Pass Valley, is a valley in Riverside County, California. Its mouth lies at an elevation of 1,696 feet/517 meters above Poorman Reservoir. Its head lies on the south slope of the northwest extreme of the ridge of Reche Summit mountain at 33°59′53″N 117°16′09″W, northeast of Pigeon Pass.
