= Colton Liberty Flag =

American flag flown over Mount Slover in California

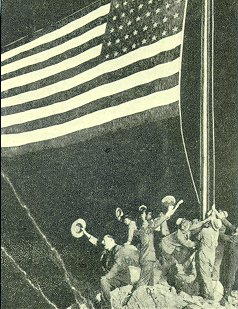
Men cheer as the flag is unfurled for the first time as part of an Independence Day celebration the night of July 4, 1917

The Colton Liberty Flag is an American flag which was flown continuously over Mount Slover in Colton, California, United States. The flag was first raised and illuminated by the California Portland Cement Company (later CalPortland) as part of an Independence Day celebration in Colton the night of July 4, 1917, as a sign of patriotism during the entrance of the United States into World War I. At the time it was one of only three locations in the United States permitted to fly the flag at night.

The flag was removed in 1952. It was replaced in 1987 to commemorate Colton's centennial, but was removed a short time later when high winds damaged the flag pole. The flag was replaced again on February 17, 1997, which was President's Day. The flag was removed a final time in April 2012 due to a reduction in cement plant operations caused by the Great Recession and the concomitant reduced personnel available to maintain the flag. It is now in the possession of the San Bernardino County Museum.
