= Slover Mountain =

American hill mined for limestone

- Mount Slover, Marble Mountain
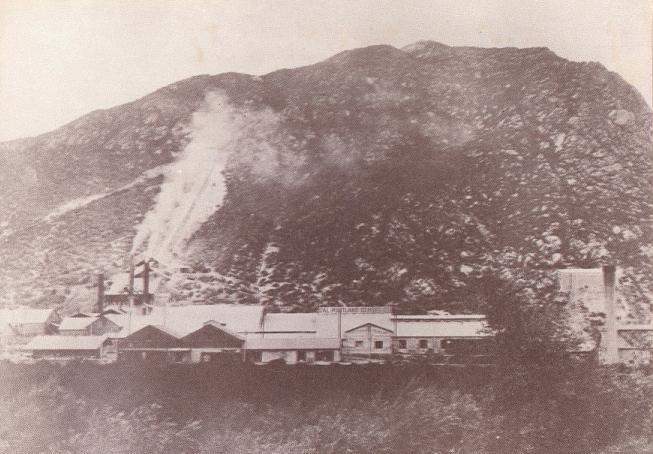
- Slover Mountain in 1891

Highest point
- Elevation: 1,184 ft (361 m)
- Coordinates: 34°03′54″N 117°20′32″W

Naming
- Native name: Tahualtapa (Tongva)

Geography
- Location within California
- Location: San Bernardino County, California, United States
- Topo map: USGS San Bernardino South

Slover Mountain (Mount Slover, Marble Mountain) is a former mountain in Colton, in southwestern San Bernardino County and the Inland Empire region of Southern California. Now a hill, it was surface mined for limestone in the 20th century. The Colton Joint Unified School District's continuation high school is named after the mountain.

The mountain was known as Tahualtapa ("raven hill") by Native Americans and Cerrito Solo ("little solitary hill") by the colonial Spanish.

== History ==
The hill was named after a local 19th century hunter, Isaac Slover, who lived near it and who died in 1854 in the Cajon Pass from injuries caused by a bear. The Colton Liberty Flag formerly stood atop the mountain.

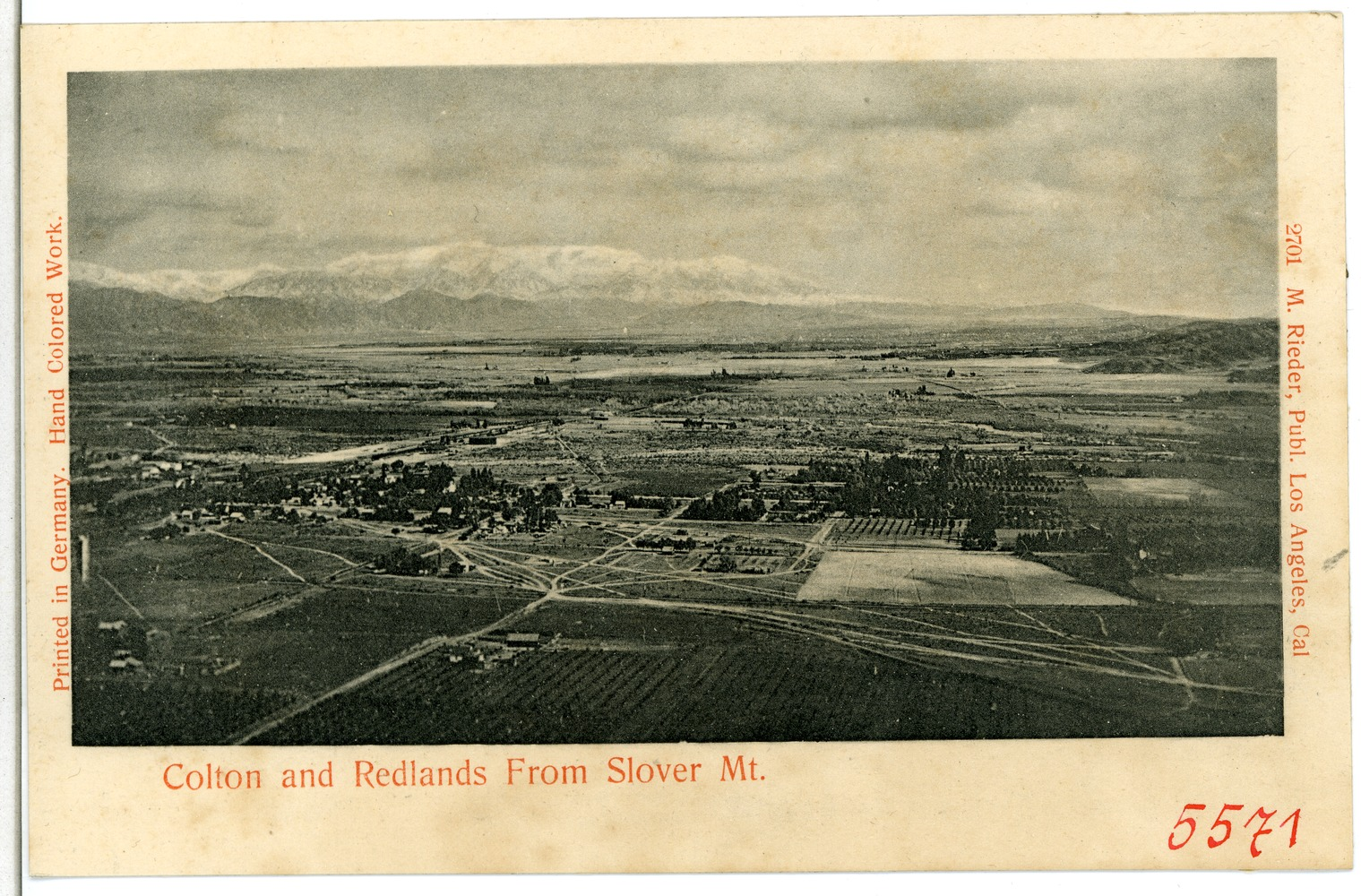
Colton and Redlands viewed from Slover Mountain in 1904.

Before the mountain was mined for marble and limestone, it stood as the tallest in the San Bernardino Valley, at 1,184 feet (361 m).
