= Grand Terrace, California =

City in California, United States

- City
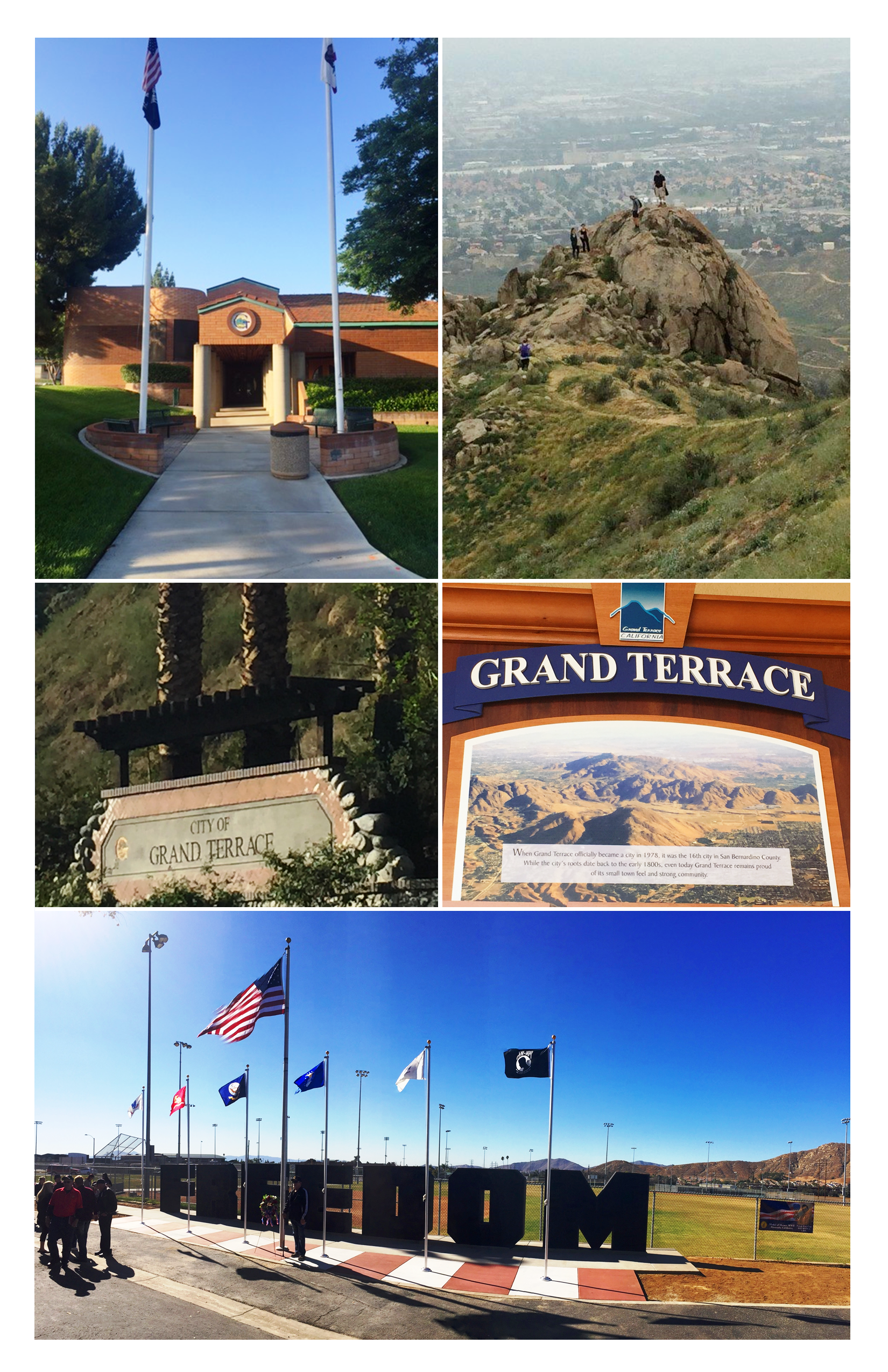
- City of Grand Terrace images from top, left to right - Grand Terrace City Hall, Blue Mountain Trail, Northeast City Entrance, Historical Plaque, Veterans Wall of Freedom

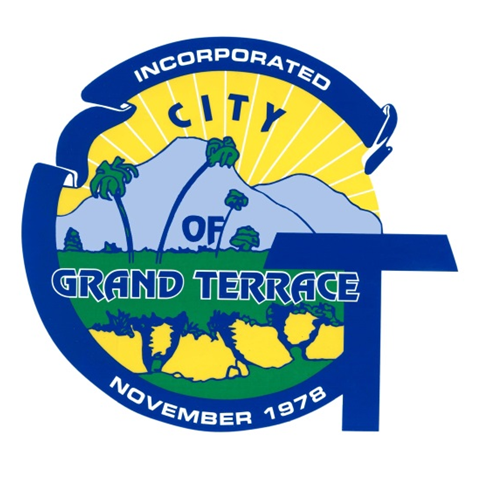
- Seal
- Interactive map of Grand Terrace, California
- Location in the United States
- Coordinates: 34°02′02″N 117°18′49″W
- Country: United States
- State: California
- County: San Bernardino
- Incorporated: November 30, 1978

Government
  - Type: Council-manager
  - Mayor: Bill Hussey
  - City Manager: Konrad Bolowich

Area
  - Total: 3.51 sq mi (9.08 km^{2})
  - Land: 3.51 sq mi (9.08 km^{2})
  - Water: 0 sq mi (0.00 km^{2}) 0%
- Elevation: 1,063 ft (324 m)

Population (2020)
  - Total: 13,150
  - Density: 3,590.6/sq mi (1,386.33/km^{2})
- Time zone: UTC-8 (PST)
  - Summer (DST): UTC-7 (PDT)
- ZIP code: 92313
- Area codes: 909, 840, 951
- FIPS code: 06-30658
- GNIS feature ID: 1660692
- Website: www.grandterrace-ca.gov

Grand Terrace is a city in the Inland Empire region of San Bernardino County, California, United States. The population was 13,150 at the 2020 census, up from 12,040 at the 2010 census. Grand Terrace is located between Highgrove and Colton, along the I-215 and Agua Mansa industrial corridors. The city is located between two mountain ridges: Blue Mountain to the east and the La Loma Hills to the west.

== History ==
Grand Terrace's roots go back to Mexican land grants dating from the period between 1830 and 1840. Mormon settlers came shortly after, arriving in the San Bernardino Valley, during the 1850s. According to the Riverside Press, in 1876, there were nine buildings in the Terrace-Colton area. Originally, the area was simply referred to as "the Terrace", but the word "Grand" was added around 1898 due to the beautiful views which surround the city. In 1905, Seventh-day Adventists, whose medical university is now located in nearby Loma Linda, settled in the area. Grand Terrace, at the time known as "South Colton", experienced continued growth and development during the Southern California suburbia and sunbelt periods in the late half of the 20th century.

The development of Grand Terrace, or East Riverside, as the Grand Terrace-Highgrove area was called, became a reality with the construction of the Gage Canal. This 22-1/2-mile canal, built at a cost of 2 million dollars, brought water from the Santa Ana River marshlands below The Terrace. With plenty of irrigation water, Grand Terrace rapidly became an agricultural community featuring fine, quality citrus. The severe "freeze" of 1913 destroyed many groves. Walnuts, a hardier tree, were planted as replacements along with peaches as a quick-profit crop.

The social activities in the early 1900s centered around the Farm Bureau Extension Service and the Women's Club, followed by the PTA, in the 1930s. Since there were no local churches, people traveled to surrounding communities for worship and other church activities.

In 1962, the Grand Terrace Chamber of Commerce was organized. From the very beginning the Chamber was interested in preserving the local identity of the area, and therefore, was a strong supporter of cityhood. This group did much of the groundwork, which led to the formation of a local governing body in 1976, which was called the Municipal Advisory Council or MAC. After nearly two years of meetings and negotiations with the county, the residents went to the polls to decide the issue of cityhood. The response was an 82% vote for incorporation. On November 30, 1978, the Charter City Council was installed at Terrace Hills Junior High and Grand Terrace officially became the 16th city in San Bernardino County.

Grand Terrace was named one of the "Top 100 Cities to Live In" by Money magazine in 2007.

== Geography ==
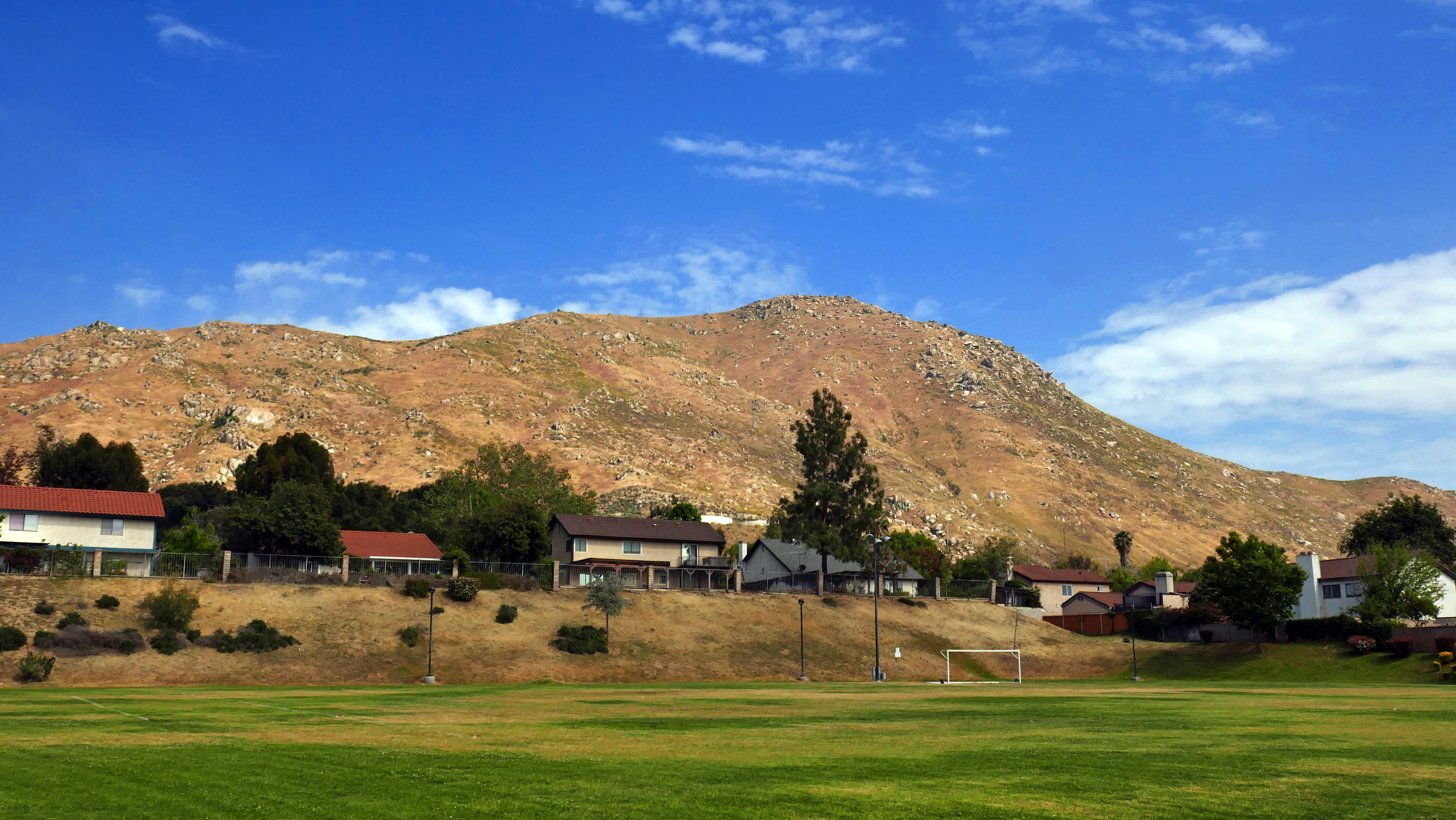
Blue Mountain in Grand Terrace, CA.

This 3.6-square-mile (9.3 km^{2}) community has an average elevation of 1,065 feet (325 m). Its motto, inscribed on the city flag, is "The Blue Mountain City" (its official slogan is "A city set upon a mountain cannot be hidden"), and refers to the Blue Lupine flower that used to grow on Blue Mountain in the spring.

According to the United States Census Bureau, the city has a total area of 3.5 square miles (9.1 km^{2}), all land.

== Demographics ==
Historical population
Census	Pop.	Note	%±
1970	5,901		—
1980	8,498		44.0%
1990	10,946		28.8%
2000	11,626		6.2%
2010	12,040		3.6%
2020	13,150		9.2%
U.S. Decennial Census

=== Racial and ethnic composition ===
Grand Terrace city, California – Racial and ethnic composition Note: the US Census treats Hispanic/Latino as an ethnic category. This table excludes Latinos from the racial categories and assigns them to a separate category. Hispanics/Latinos may be of any race.
Race / Ethnicity (NH = Non-Hispanic)	Pop 2000	Pop 2010	Pop 2020	% 2000	% 2010	% 2020
White alone (NH)	7,071	5,582	4,497	60.82%	46.36%	34.20%
Black or African American alone (NH)	529	641	828	4.55%	5.32%	6.30%
Native American or Alaska Native alone (NH)	54	42	47	0.46%	0.35%	0.36%
Asian alone (NH)	645	739	813	5.55%	6.14%	6.18%
Native Hawaiian or Pacific Islander alone (NH)	26	21	40	0.22%	0.17%	0.30%
Other race alone (NH)	24	35	142	0.21%	0.29%	1.08%
Mixed race or Multiracial (NH)	323	272	486	2.78%	2.26%	3.70%
Hispanic or Latino (any race)	2,954	4,708	6,297	25.41%	39.10%	47.89%
Total	11,626	12,040	13,150	100.00%	100.00%	100.00%

=== 2020 census ===
As of the 2020 census, Grand Terrace had a population of 13,150. The population density was 3,753.9 inhabitants per square mile (1,449.4/km^{2}). The age distribution was 21.5% under the age of 18, 9.5% aged 18 to 24, 28.0% aged 25 to 44, 24.1% aged 45 to 64, and 16.9% who were 65 years of age or older. The median age was 38.1 years. For every 100 females, there were 92.9 males, and for every 100 females age 18 and over there were 90.6 males age 18 and over.

The census reported that 98.9% of the population lived in households, 0.8% lived in non-institutionalized group quarters, and 0.3% were institutionalized. There were 4,695 households, of which 34.6% had children under the age of 18 living in them. Of all households, 48.2% were married-couple households, 7.4% were cohabiting couple households, 16.5% were households with a male householder and no spouse or partner present, and 27.8% were households with a female householder and no spouse or partner present. About 22.3% of all households were made up of individuals and 10.1% had someone living alone who was 65 years of age or older. The average household size was 2.77. There were 3,345 families (71.2% of all households).

There were 4,898 housing units at an average density of 1,398.2 units per square mile (539.8 units/km^{2}), of which 4,695 (95.9%) were occupied. Of these, 62.1% were owner-occupied, and 37.9% were occupied by renters. About 4.1% of housing units were vacant. The homeowner vacancy rate was 1.1% and the rental vacancy rate was 7.1%.

100.0% of residents lived in urban areas, while 0.0% lived in rural areas.

Racial composition as of the 2020 census
Race	Number	Percent
White	5,847	44.5%
Black or African American	908	6.9%
American Indian and Alaska Native	229	1.7%
Asian	850	6.5%
Native Hawaiian and Other Pacific Islander	50	0.4%
Some other race	3,042	23.1%
Two or more races	2,224	16.9%

=== 2023 ACS 5-year estimates ===
In 2023, the US Census Bureau estimated that 14.1% of the population were foreign-born. Of all people aged 5 or older, 64.7% spoke only English at home, 28.9% spoke Spanish, 1.7% spoke other Indo-European languages, 3.4% spoke Asian or Pacific Islander languages, and 1.3% spoke other languages. Of those aged 25 or older, 87.0% were high school graduates and 28.5% had a bachelor's degree.

The median household income in 2023 was $83,668, and the per capita income was $36,267. About 4.6% of families and 7.0% of the population were below the poverty line.

=== 2010 census ===
The 2010 United States census reported that Grand Terrace had a population of 12,040. The population density was 3,438.0 inhabitants per square mile (1,327.4/km^{2}). The racial makeup of Grand Terrace was 7,912 (65.7%) White (46.4% Non-Hispanic White), 673 (5.6%) African American, 120 (1.0%) Native American, 778 (6.5%) Asian, 32 (0.3%) Pacific Islander, 1,898 (15.8%) from other races, and 627 (5.2%) from two or more races. Hispanic or Latino of any race were 4,708 persons (39.1%).

The census reported that 11,927 people (99.1% of the population) lived in households, 50 (0.4%) lived in non-institutionalized group quarters, and 63 (0.5%) were institutionalized.

There were 4,403 households, of which 1,548 (35.2%) had children under the age of 18 living in them, 2,214 (50.3%) were opposite-sex married couples living together, 599 (13.6%) had a female householder with no husband present, 254 (5.8%) had a male householder with no wife present. There were 285 (6.5%) unmarried opposite-sex partnerships, and 26 (0.6%) same-sex married couples or partnerships. 1,026 households (23.3%) were made up of individuals, and 395 (9.0%) had someone living alone who was 65 years of age or older. The average household size was 2.71. There were 3,067 families (69.7% of all households); the average family size was 3.20.

2,781 people (23.1% of the population) were under the age of 18, 1,244 people (10.3%) aged 18 to 24, 3,320 people (27.6%) aged 25 to 44, 3,195 people (26.5%) aged 45 to 64, and 1,500 people (12.5%) who were 65 years of age or older. The median age was 36.1 years. For every 100 females, there were 92.9 males. For every 100 females age 18 and over, there were 89.6 males.

There were 4,649 housing units at an average density of 1,327.5 per square mile (512.6/km^{2}), of which 2,790 (63.4%) were owner-occupied, and 1,613 (36.6%) were occupied by renters. The homeowner vacancy rate was 1.7%; the rental vacancy rate was 7.0%. 7,848 people (65.2% of the population) lived in owner-occupied housing units and 4,079 people (33.9%) lived in rental housing units.

According to the 2010 United States Census, Grand Terrace had a median household income of $64,073, with 6.5% of the population living below the federal poverty line.

== Government ==
In the California State Legislature, Grand Terrace is in the 19th senatorial district, represented by Republican Rosilicie Ochoa Bogh, and in the 58th Assembly district, represented by Republican Leticia Castillo.

In the United States House of Representatives, Grand Terrace is in California's 33rd congressional district, represented by Democrat Pete Aguilar.

Currently the city council consists of Mayor Bill Hussey, Michelle Sabino, Douglas Wilson, Jeff Allen, and Matt Brown.

The City Manager is Konrad Bolowich.

== Public safety ==
The City of Grand Terrace contracts with the San Bernardino County Sheriff's Department. The San Bernardino County Fire Department has a fire station on City Center Court.

== Education ==
The Colton Joint Unified School District serves the students of Grand Terrace with Grand Terrace Elementary School, Terrace View Elementary School, Terrace Hills Middle School, and Grand Terrace High School at the Ray Abril Jr. Educational Complex. The Roman Catholic Diocese of San Bernardino operates the Blessed Junipero Serra House of Formation in Grand Terrace.

== Notable Crime ==
- Ramona Dorsey fatally beat her 11-year-old son, Kevin Lee Wilburn, authorities said. The boy died at Loma Linda University Medical Center on November 16, 1991.
- On June 27, 1997, Joseph Marquez was found shot to death behind a building off of La Cadena and De Berry Road.
- In 2005-2006 the gang Mind Twisted Hustlers (MTH) and their associates, were investigated by the San Bernardino County Sheriff. For operating a criminal ring in the Grand Terrace area responsible for numerous residential and vehicle burglaries, identity theft, fraud, and drug distribution. As a result, many were incarcerated, mostly juveniles. They have since been dismantled.
- On June 7, 2009, park manager John Haning and a maintenance man were doing monthly rounds to check on meters inside the Grand Royal Estates on Newport Avenue when they came across the body of 63-year-old Thomas Harker Sr. Sheriff's detectives arrested 28-year-old Thomas Harker Jr., who is suspected of stabbing his 63-year-old father to death behind the mobile home they shared.
- On January 1, 2015, Richard Williamson, 48, died in a gun battle outside the Cal Skate Roller Rink. Another security guard and a bystander were also injured. The rink was hosting an all-night New Year's Eve celebration when a suspect was asked to leave. Shortly after, shots were fired in the parking lot just before 2 a.m. The shooting left bullet holes in the building, a parked car and a big rig parked across the street. After an investigation, detectives arrested Ezekiel Isaiah George, 18, of Perris; Topaz Prince Crummie, 20, of San Jacinto; Adrian Gentry, 17, of Adelanto; Laquan Trice, 15, of Perris; and Maurice Lamont Martin, Jr., 17, of Perris.
- About 1:50 a.m. March 16, 2019, San Bernardino County deputies responded to a silent robbery alarm at Cal Skate Grand Terrace and eventually found victim, Ryan Harsany unconscious inside along with a fire. Harsany was taken to a hospital, where authorities determined he had been shot multiple times. He died shortly before 7:30 a.m. Tre’elle Potts, 25, of Moreno Valley, was arrested and charged with the murder of Ryan Harsany, 43. He faces special allegations of arson causing bodily injury and that he used a firearm.
