= Agua Mansa, California =

Agua Mansa
- Ghost town
- Location within the state of California Agua Mansa (the United States)
- Coordinates: 34°02′31″N 117°21′50″W
- Country: United States of America
- State: California
- County: San Bernardino
- Elevation: 922 ft (281 m)
- Time zone: UTC-8 (Pacific (PST))
  - Summer (DST): UTC-7 (PDT)
- GNIS feature ID: 238451

Agua Mansa Cemetery
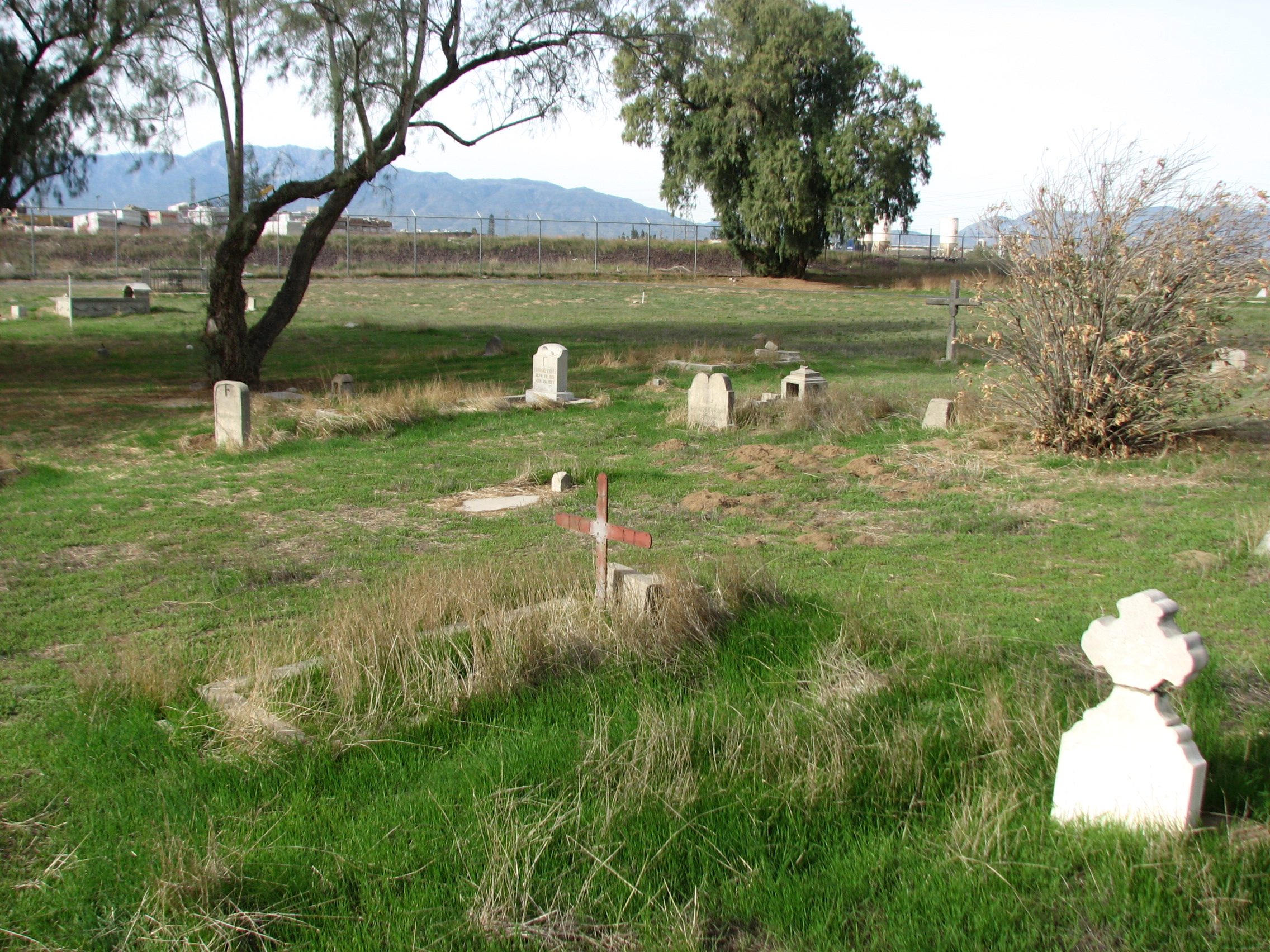
- Interactive map of Agua Mansa Cemetery

History
- Built: 1845

California Historical Landmark
- Designated: May 15, 1933
- Reference no.: 121

Agua Mansa (Spanish for "gentle water") is a former settlement in an unincorporated area of San Bernardino County, near Colton, California, United States. Once the largest settlement in San Bernardino County, it is now a ghost town. Only the cemetery remains.

The town was established in 1842 in early California, then known as Alta California. It was on the Santa Ana River, across from the era settlement of La Placita. Agua Mansa and La Placita were the first non-native settlements in the San Bernardino Valley. Together known as "San Salvador", they were also the largest settlements between Santa Fe de Nuevo México and the Pueblo de Los Ángeles in the 1840s.

== Geography ==
The Agua Mansa Valley is located on the south side of Slover Mountain. The valley was 6 mi (9.7 km) in length; its width varied between .5 mi (0.80 km) and .75 mi (1.21 km), the variance depending on the river that flowed through the valley. The area was used as farmland, divided into at least one hundred fields, owned by separate ranchers. The valley's lower end included a Frémont's cottonwoods (Populus fremontii) riparian forest owned by Rubidoux, while the upper end was a sandy plain that extended to the borders of present-day San Bernardino.

== History ==
In 1845, Don Juan Bandini donated parts of his land grant Rancho Jurupa to a group of New Mexican colonists led by Santiago Martinez, and Manuel Lorenzo Trujillo from Abiquiú in Santa Fe de Nuevo México — on the condition that they would provide in protection from local Indian raids, in exchange for land, "Civil Militia" Ten of these families moved to 2,000 acres (810 ha) on the "Bandini Donation" on the east side of the Santa Ana River, forming the village of La Placita, while a second group colonized the west side of the river, forming the town of Agua Mansa. The group that formed Agua Mansa was led by Santiago Martinez, Manuel Lorenzo Martinez and Hipilito Garcia, and included Cristobal Slover and Louis Rubidoux.

After the adobe church built in La Placita in 1852 collapsed in quicksand, a new church was built in Agua Mansa. Completed in 1853 and dedicated to San Salvador, the church survived through the Great Flood of 1862. The parish, which included Agua Mansa and La Placita, became known as San Salvador de Jurupa, and was the first non-mission parish in Southern California. The chapel's bell now hangs at the Glenwood Mission Inn.

The town prospered for almost 20 years until the 1862 flooding swept away many of the adobe buildings, leaving the area strewn with sand and gravel. Though the town was rebuilt on higher ground, its prosperity did not return.

Built in 1870 in Agua Mansa, the Jensen Alvarado Ranch is a California Historical Landmark and is listed on the National Register of Historic Places. Its vineyard produced and sold thousands of gallons of wine each year.

=== Agua Mansa Pioneer Cemetery ===
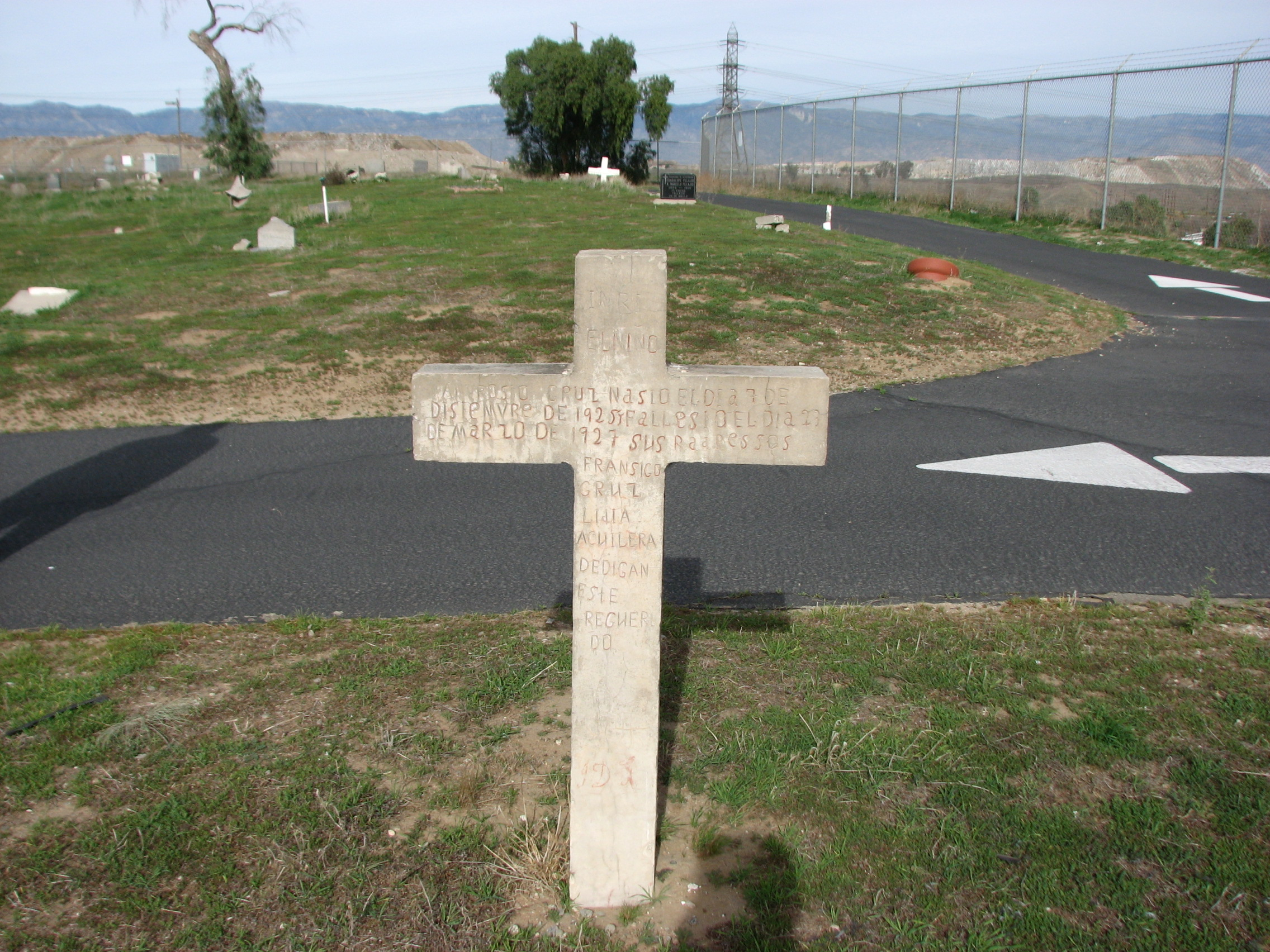
A grave marker at the Agua Mansa cemetery.

Agua Mansa is designated California Historical Landmark No. 121. The marker is located at Agua Mansa Pioneer Cemetery, the only site that remains of the once flourishing town. The first burial occurred in 1852, and the last occurred 111 years later in 1963. It has a museum and chapel, and tours are available.

Records of who is buried in the cemetery are incomplete but about 1,400 (as of October 2018) names have been identified out of a total of 2,000 estimated burials. Only a few grave markers remain today. The earliest known interment was that of Louis Rubidoux, who came to California in 1844 and bought the Jurupa Rancho near today's City of Riverside. Another burial was that of Cornelius Jensen in 1886; Jensen was a Danish sea captain who established a store at Agua Mansa before moving to part of the Robidoux ranch. Jensen's wife, Mercedes Alvarado, is also buried in the cemetery along with other members of her family. Lorenzo Trujillo, the original patriarch of the community, is also believed to rest somewhere in a grave that long ago lost its marker. Isaac Slover, a mountain man and bear hunter who came to California in his old age (and who was killed in 1854 by a bear), is also buried in the cemetery.

== California Historical Landmark Marker ==
- This historic site marks the resting place of the pioneers of the Agua Mansa area which was started about 1840. The preservation of this cemetery began in 1951. Erected 1961 by Jurupa Palor No. 296 Native Daughters of the Golden West. (Marker Number 121.)

== Artistic portrayals ==
Agua Mansa is the namesake of a fictional town in Southern California in the contemporary novel Still Water Saints by writer Alex Espinoza.

== See also ==
- California Historical Landmarks in San Bernardino County, California
