= David D. Colton =

American pioneer, entrepreneur & politician (1831-1878)

David Douty Colton
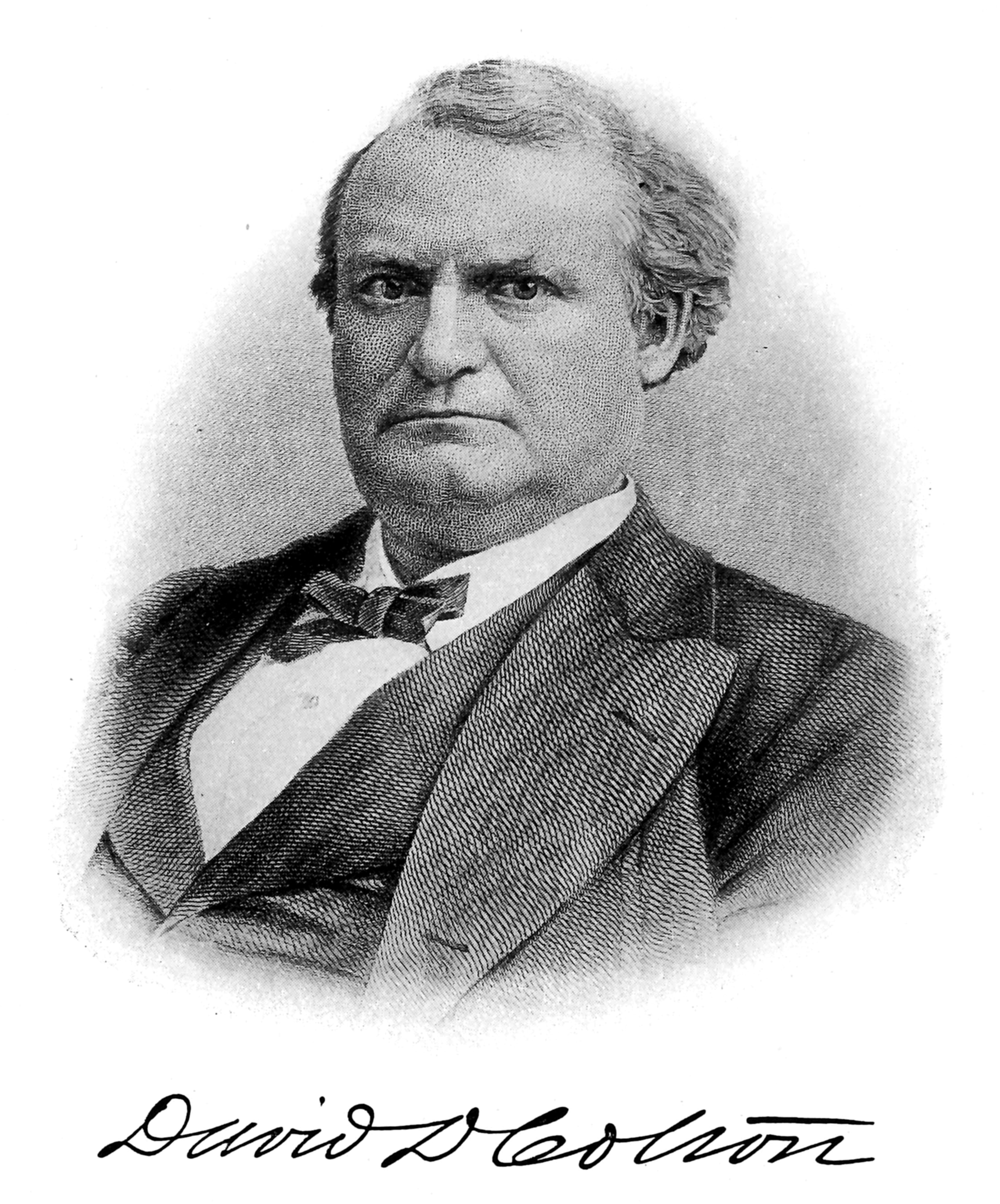
- David D. Colton
- Born: July 17, 1831; Maine, United States
- Died: October 9, 1878 (aged 47)
- Occupations: Entrepreneur politician
- Spouse: Ellen M. White (m. 1853)
- Parents: Isacc W. Colton (father); Abigail Douty (mother)

General David Douty Colton (July 17, 1831– October 9, 1878) was an American pioneer, entrepreneur, and politician. The city of Colton, California, is named for him.

== Early life ==
Colton was born in the state of Maine, of Isacc W. Colton and Abigail Douty. The family moved west when he was a child, via Galesburg, Illinois. He became engaged to Ellen M. White of Chicago, but made his way to Sacramento, California, and on to Oregon in 1850 before getting married. Just across the border into California, he took up gold prospecting in Siskiyou County, California, when it was still dangerous to do so among the Native American population there.

Colton settled in California at Yreka, where he became sheriff of Siskiyou County for four years. He was given the title "Brigadier-General of Militia" by California Governor John Bigler after successfully defending the county jail against an angry mob of miners.

In 1853, Colton returned to Galesburg and married Ellen White.

When the Civil War broke out, General Colton declared himself in favor of the Union.

== Career ==
Colton built the first of the railroad magnate mansions on Nob Hill in San Francisco. "Colton—the chief lawyer for the Central Pacific Railroad, owned by Crocker, Hopkins, Stanford, and Huntington—was known with derision as the 'Half' of the 'Big Four and a Half'."

== Legacy ==
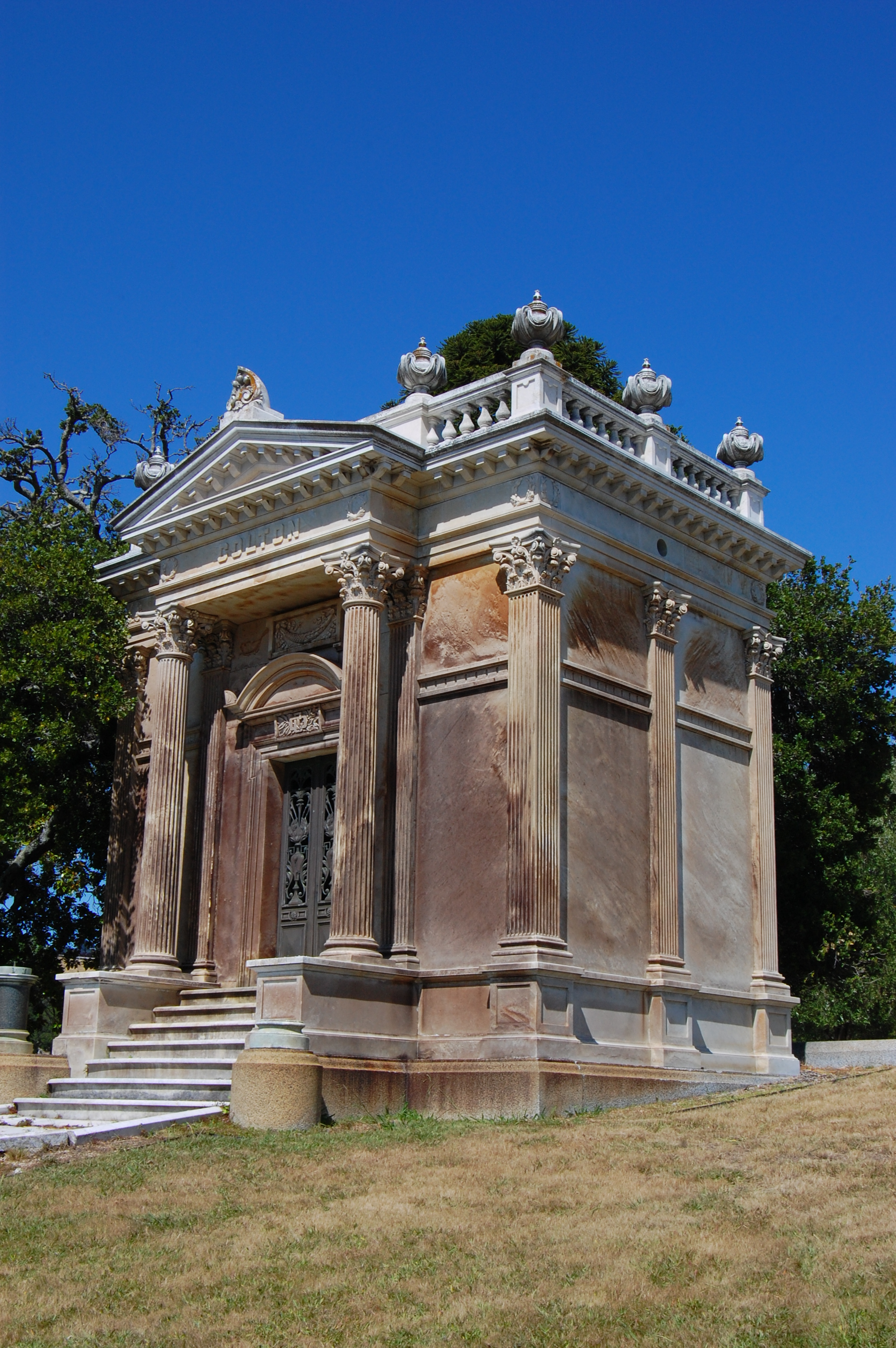
Tomb

According to the city of Colton's history, "The town of Colton was laid out when the Southern Pacific Railway was constructed through the valley on its way eastward from Los Angeles in 1875. Colton was named for Civil War General David Colton who was also Vice President of the Southern Pacific Railroad Company." Colton never lived in Colton.
