= Reche Canyon =

Canyon in southern California, United States

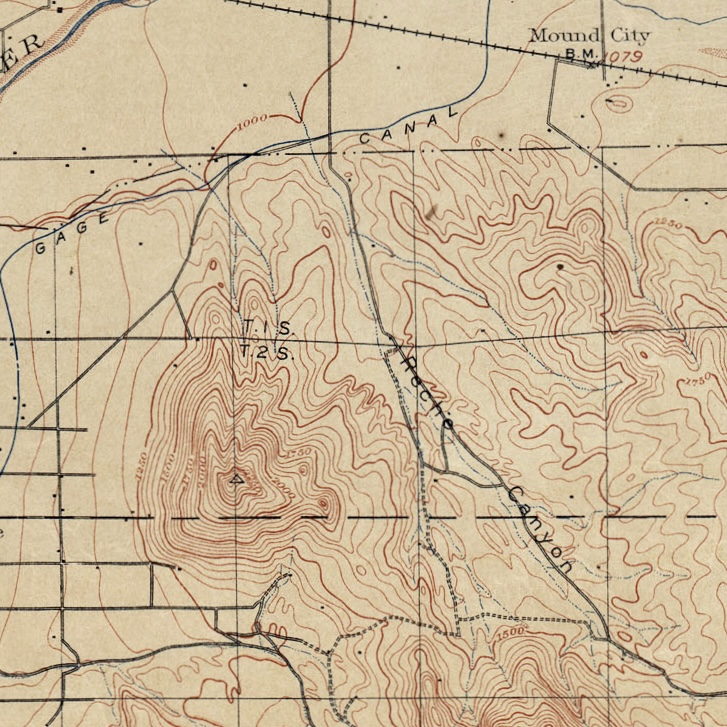
- 1894 USGS topographical map of Reche Canyon

- Location within southern California
- Floor elevation: 1,043 ft (318 m)
- Long-axis direction: north-south

Geography
- Coordinates: 33°58′09″N 117°11′47″W
- Topo map: Sunnymead
- Traversed by: Reche Canyon Road
- Rivers: Reche Canyon Creek; Homoa Creek
- Interactive map of Reche Canyon

Reche Canyon (/ˈrɛtʃiː/ REH-chee)) (historically known as Homhoa Canyon, Homoa Canyon, and Homuba Canyon) is a canyon in the far northwestern foothills of the San Jacinto Mountains, northwest of The Badlands in the Inland Empire region of Southern California. The Tongva village of Homhoangna, from which the canyon's alternative names derives, was located here. The county line between San Bernardino County and Riverside County is at the approximate midway point of the canyon; the San Bernardino half to the north is mostly within the boundaries of Colton, with a small area in Loma Linda, while the southern half is unincorporated territory of Riverside County. Reche Canyon Elementary School is located in the northern part of the canyon.

== History ==
The canyon is said to be named for a 49er named Anthony Reche, who initially settled in Fallbrook and moved to the canyon in 1875. Reche had 160 acres on which he farmed and "raised bees."

In the 1890s, a settler named John Console built a one-room schoolhouse in the canyon for the use of his own children; other students began attending around 1910. The building was later moved and renamed Ferndale School. The school held classes until at least 1951, when the building was condemned by Riverside County.

Canyon residents got electricity for the first time in the 1940s.

== Ecology ==
In 1976, Console's son described the canyon as having been habitat for many wild creatures including bobcats, coyotes, quail, and rabbits. In 1912 two of the Console girls killed a 6-foot (1.8 m)-long rattlesnake with 14 rattles.

Wild burros, released from local ranches in the 1950s, number over a 1,000.

== Transportation ==
Along with San Timoteo Canyon and Pigeon Pass, the canyon links San Bernardino and its surrounding cities in the San Bernardino Valley to the city of Moreno Valley. The road through the canyon is used as a shortcut and to avoid traffic by commuters looking for an alternative to Interstate 215 and California State Route 60.

== See also ==
- Console Springs
