= Jensen Alvarado Ranch =

Historic house in California, United States

- Cornelius Jensen Ranch
- U.S. National Register of Historic Places
- California Historical Landmark No. 943
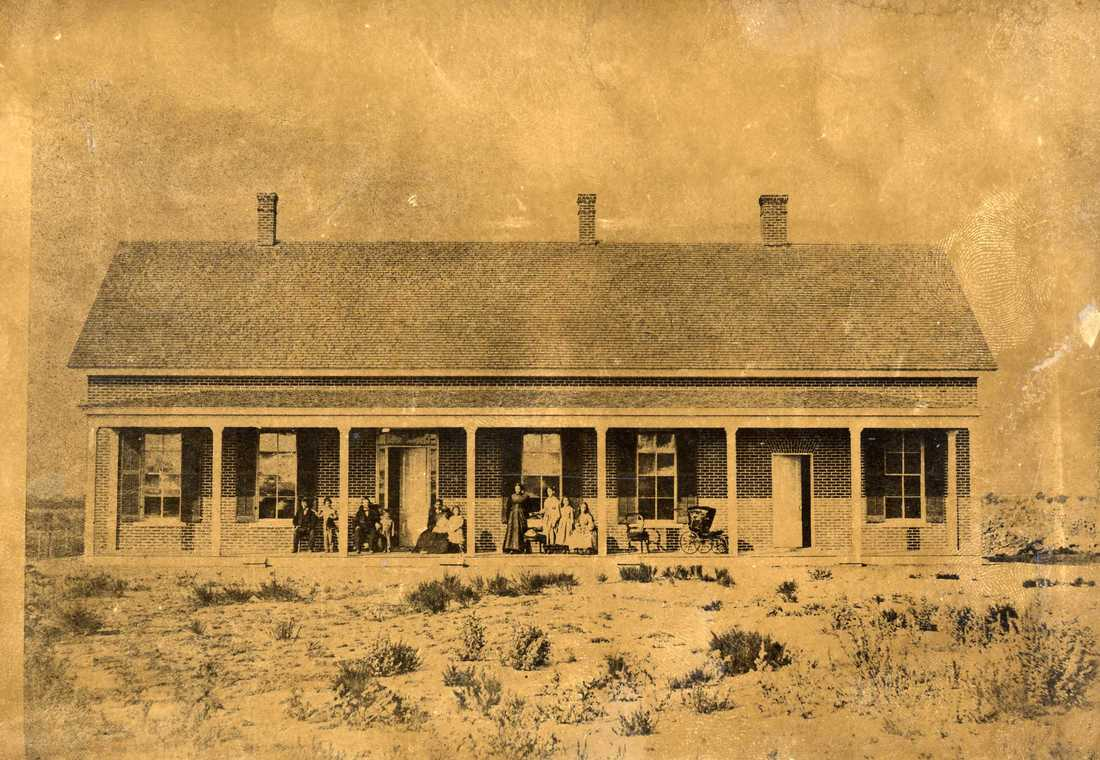
- Jensen Alvarado Ranch House in 1870

- Location within California Location within the United States
- Location: Jurupa Valley, Riverside County, California, US
- Nearest city: Riverside, California
- Coordinates: 33.993°N 117.419°W
- Built: 1870
- Architectural style: Danish vernacular
- NRHP reference No.: 79000519
- CHISL No.: 943
- Added to NRHP: September 6, 1979

The Jensen Alvarado Ranch is a historic park and museum in Jurupa Valley, California, US, and is operated by the Riverside County Regional Park and Open-Space District. It can be accessed from 4350 Riverview Drive, or 4307 Briggs Street. It was the first kiln-fired brick building built in Riverside County, and is the oldest non-adobe structure in the Inland Empire.

== History ==
The Danish sea captain Cornelius Jensen settled in Agua Mansa around 1854 where he ran a store, and he married Californio Mercedes Alvarado soon thereafter. After the Great Flood of 1862, most of the town was destroyed with the exception of the cemetery, the chapel, and Jensen's store. Some years later, Jensen bought a part of the Rubidoux ranch. Jensen and Alvarado bought land in Agua Mansa in 1865.

They built their Danish vernacular style home between 1868 and 1870 on a ranch of 300–400 acres (120–160 ha). Jensen built his home on this land using traditional bricks, having learned from the 1862 flood that adobe bricks dissolve in water. Their home, which served as the area's general store, post office, and stage stop, was built next to the town's chapel. The ranch, valued at one time at approximately $30,000, was the second-most valuable in Riverside County.

== Architecture ==
The home's architectural style, Danish vernacular, reflected Jensen's Sylt birthplace, while also incorporating a front porch, which reflected Mercedes' influence as a Californio. The house was the first kiln-fired brick building in the county. It was also one of California's first clay brick buildings, and it used clay found on the ranch itself. The rock foundation and the lime used in the mortar were from a Jensen's quarry north of the house. The wood for the house beams came from the San Bernardino Mountains. The house has high ceilings, but only one closet.

There are several other brick buildings on the ranch, including a winery, which now serves as a museum.

== Agriculture ==
In addition to apricot and orange orchards, growing wheat, and raising sheep on the Agua Mansa ranch, the Jensens had another 400 acres (160 ha) in Temecula. While Riverside was a temperance city, the Jensen's Agua Mansa ranch, on the other side of the Santa Ana River, had a vineyard; 2,000 US gallons (7,600 L) of wine were produced and sold each year.

== Landmark ==
The ranch and home are part of the 32 acres (13 ha) Jensen Alvarado Ranch Historic Park and Museum, an 1880s living history interpretive museum administered by Riverside County Parks. Tourists are led by interpreters, dressed in period clothing, who demonstrate butter churning and cooking tortillas.

The property is a registered California Historical Landmark (Cornelius and Mercedes Jensen Ranch, No. 943) and was listed on the National Register of Historic Places on September 6, 1979. It is notable for the architecture, and agricultural development of the time, as well as Jensen's settlement here, and his career in government.
