= Homhoangna =

Tongva populated place

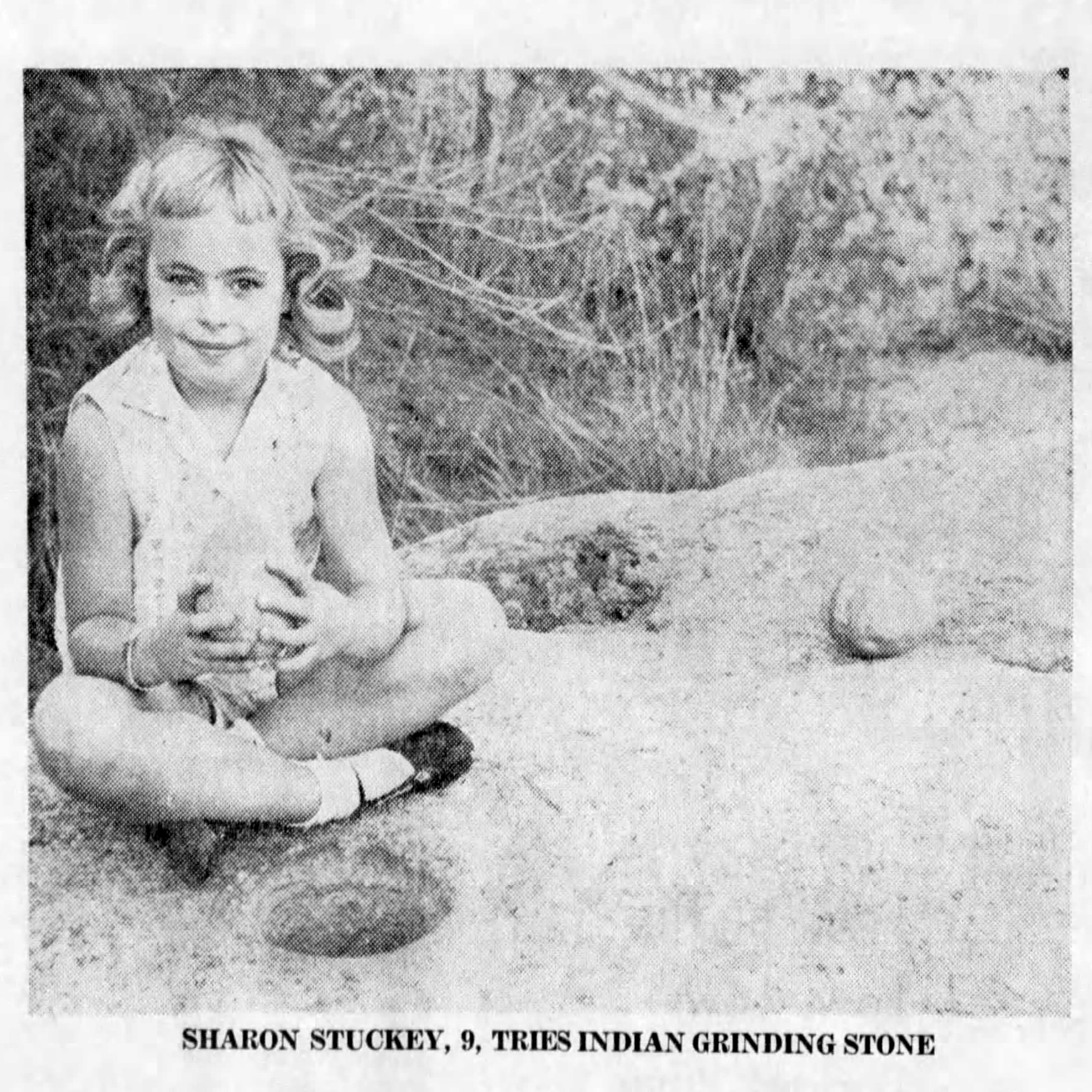
Rock cupule in Reche Canyon (San Bernardino Sun, Dec. 15, 1959)

Homhoangna (alternatively Homoa or Homhoa, Hispanicized to Jumuba) was a Tongva village located at what is now the area in-between the Santa Ana River, Colton Avenue, and the Southern Pacific Railroad. The village is associated with the area of Colton, California.

The village's name is reflected in the alternative place name designation for Reche Canyon, which is also known as Homhoa Canyon, Homoa Canyon, and Homuba Canyon. The Tongva language word for "hilly place" was reportedly homhoabit.

The village was located at the base of the foothills which surrounded it.

During a visit in September 1821, Spanish missionary José Bernardo Sánchez recorded the village was made up of homes where the river formed a beautiful cove and there were three springs of water. Referred to by the Spanish as the Jumuba Ranchería, the village's location would later become the site of Fort Benson.

== See also ==
- Console Springs
