= Kalmia Hills =

Mountain range in California, United States

- Location within California Location within the United States

Highest point
- Elevation: 2,405 ft (733 m)

Geography
- Country: United States
- State: California
- Region: Peninsular Ranges
- District: Riverside County
- Range coordinates: 33°57′46.059″N 117°11′45.135″W
- Topo map: USGS Sunnymead

The Kalmia Hills are a low mountain range of the Peninsular Ranges System, in northwestern Riverside County, California, United States.

== Geography ==
The range defines the northern side of the Moreno Valley landform, and is north of the city of Moreno Valley. Their highest point is 2,405 feet (733 m) in elevation.

The Box Springs Mountains parallel them along the southwest, and the La Loma Hills and community of Grand Terrace are to the northwest.

Geology

Geologically, the Kalmia Hills are on the northeastern edge of the Perris Block formation, along the San Jacinto Fault Zone.

== See also ==
- Mountain ranges of Riverside County, California
