= San Felipe Fault Zone =

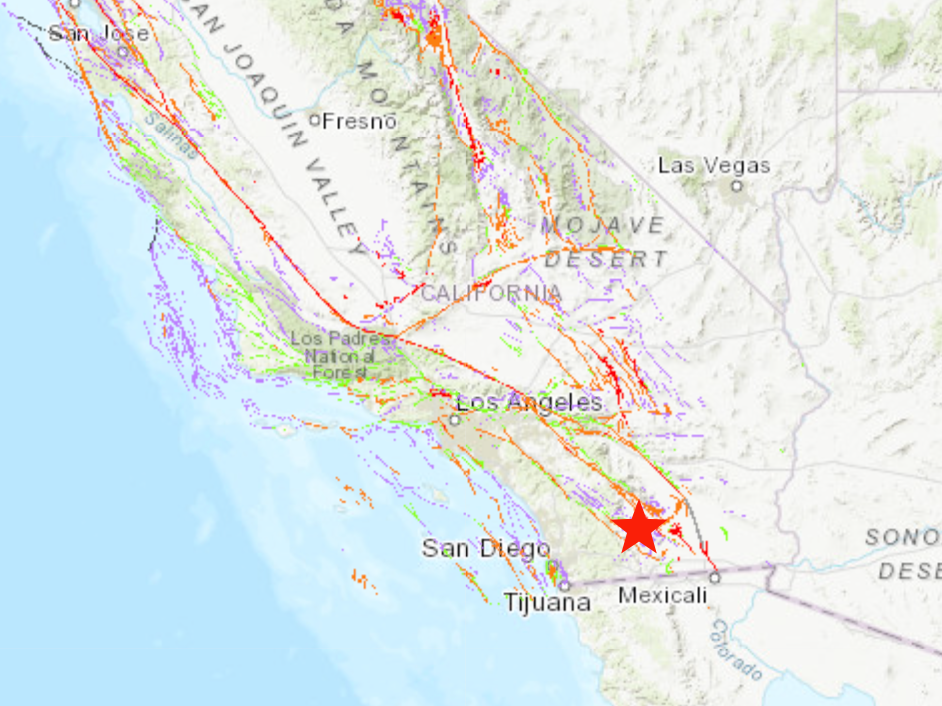
San Felipe Fault system located in Southern California

The San Felipe Fault Zone (also known as the Agua Caliente or Murrieta Hot Springs Fault zone) is an active Quaternary fault zone made up of continuous right-lateral fault strands]. It is a part of the San Andreas Fault system and it is located in the western Salton Trough spanning three counties: Imperial, Riverside, and San Diego county, California. It is hypothesized to have originated during the early Pleistocene period.

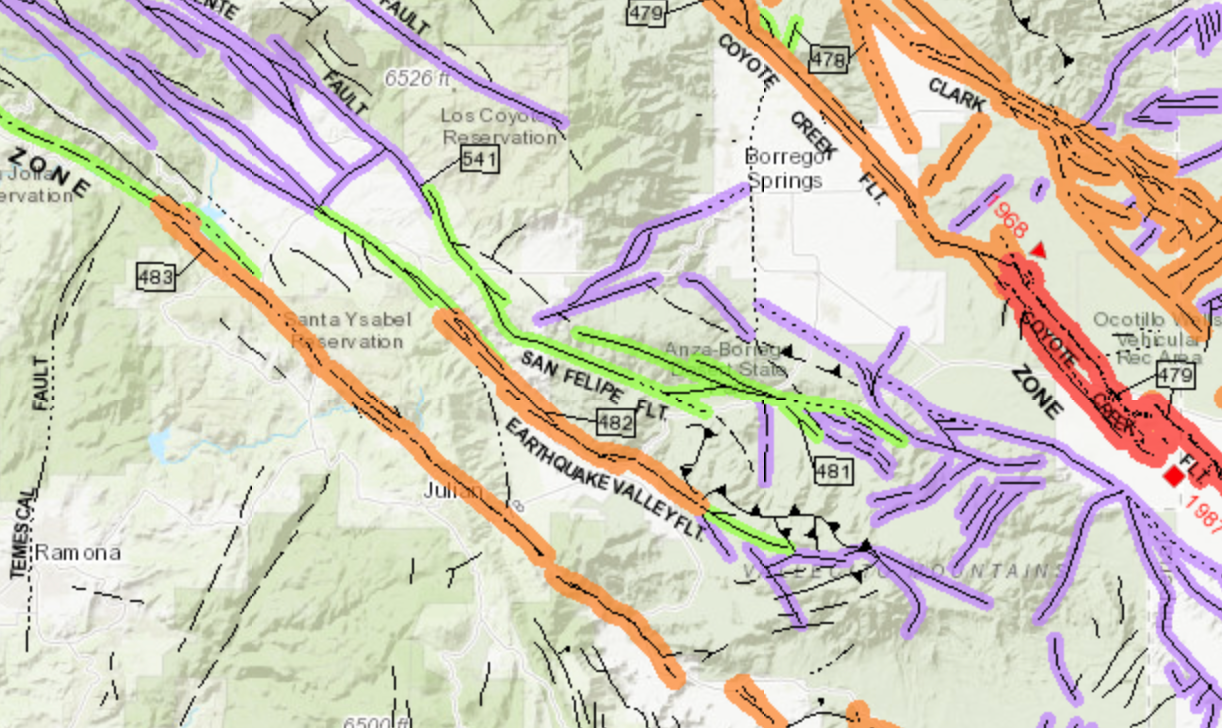
The San Felipe Fault zone is within the San Andreas Fault system.

== Geography ==
The fault zone strikes WNW and consists of a central Easterly fault with adjacent strands extending out from the San Felipe anticline. The fault zone is part of the Earthquake Valley, within the Pacific Border Ranges and Basin and Range physiographic provinces. In total the faults run 170 kilometers long.

The main San Felipe Fault extends from the Elsinore Fault to the San Jacinto Fault, South on the Yaqui and Pinyon ridge. The Fish Creek Mountains fault is the eastern extension that runs along the Fish Creek Mountains.

=== Origin ===
The San Felipe Fault zone is estimated to have originated 1.1-1.3 Ma. During its rise to the surface, the San Felipe Fault created the San Felipe-Borrego basin and the San Felipe anticline.

=== Movement ===
About half of the San Andreas Fault system's movement has been from the San Felipe fault zone. It has seen 5.8±2.8 km of right separation since its inception. Both the San Jacinto Fault zone and San Felipe fault zones reorganized in the middle to late Pleistocene era and accumulated 600 meters of sediment during uplift and folding. These 600 meters of sediment make up the Sunset strand of the San Felipe Fault zone. The current deformation (started 0.5-0.6 Ma) is the shortening of the fault, which inverts and exhumes sediment accumulation. It is estimated to have between 4 and 12.4 kilometers of right slip.
