= Console Springs =

Body of water, California

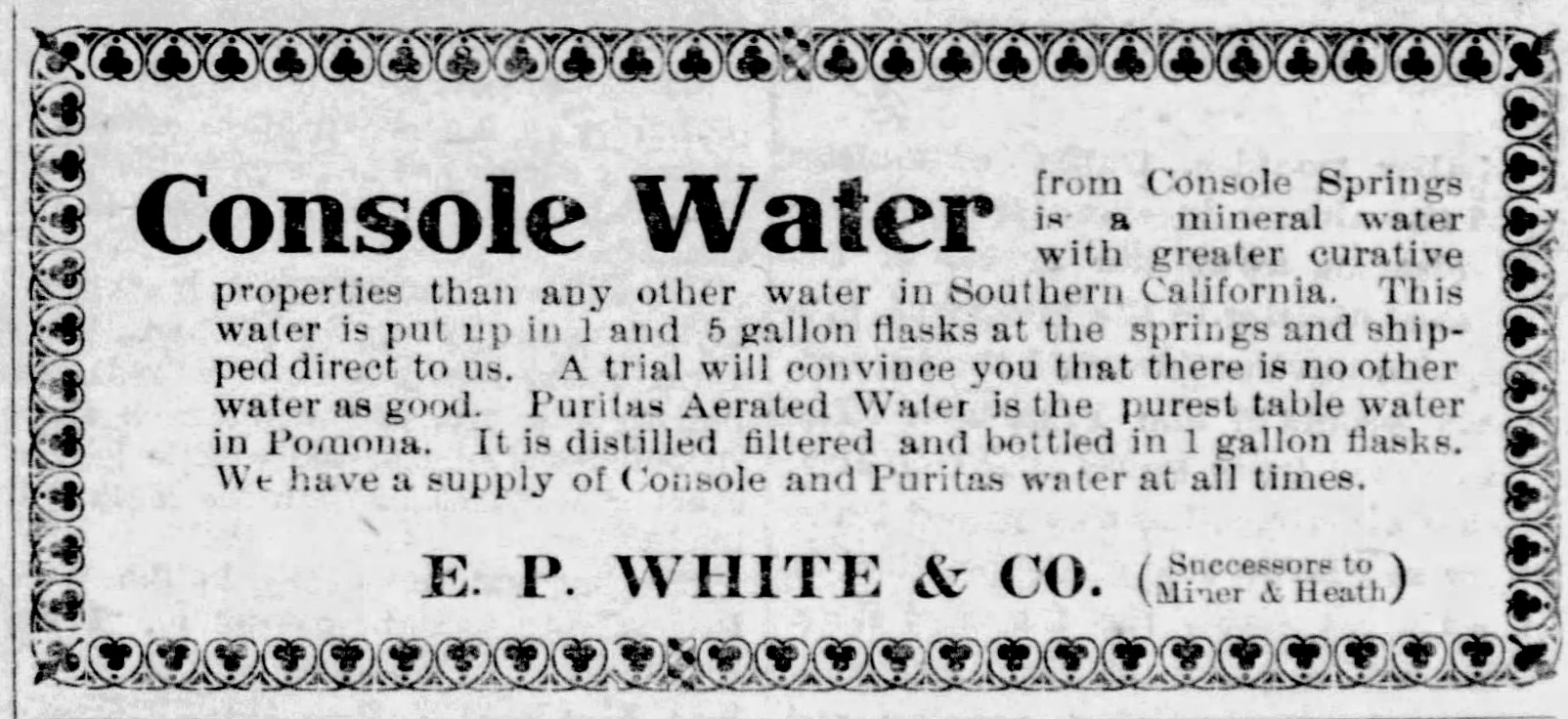
- "Console Water" Pomona Daily Review, August 25, 1906
- Interactive map of Console Springs
- Coordinates: 33.9833°N 117.2172°W

Console Springs was a natural spring in Reche Canyon, Riverside County (originally San Bernardino County), California, United States. The waters were bottled for sale in the early 20th century.

== History ==
The springs were named for the Console family that owned them. John Console (~1862–1926) settled in the canyon in 1894. Console built the canyon schoolhouse; water for the students was toted from the spring. Console sold the bottled water out of a "wagon on 3rd Street" but "sales were slow." He also sold holly (possibly actually native toyon) out of his wagon around Christmastime. A native of Sicily, Console was a stone mason by trade.

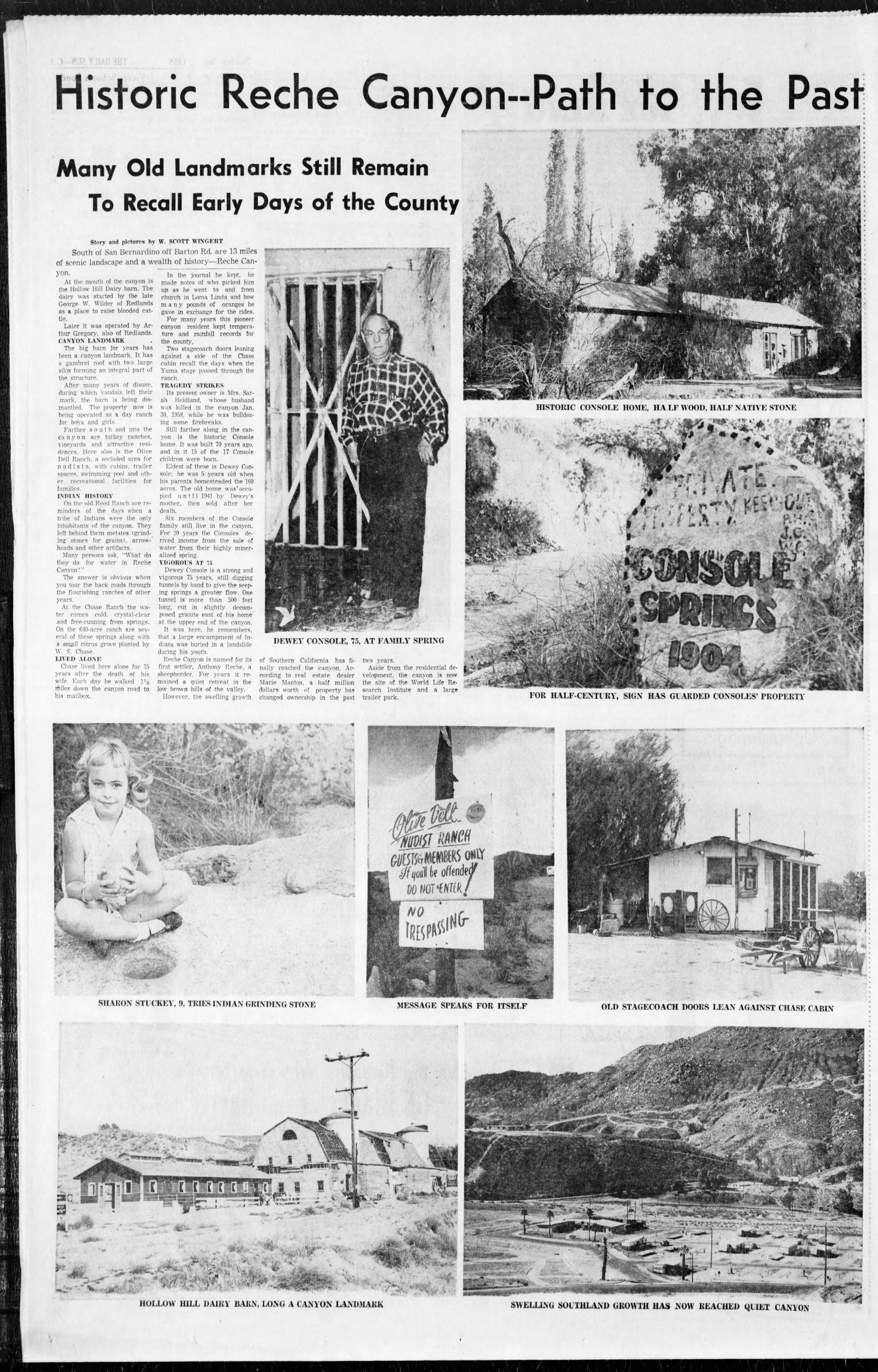
"Historic Reche Canyon—Path to the Past" (San Bernardino County Sun, Dec. 15, 1959)

There was no associated resort hotel but circa 1914 there were campsites nearby for visitors. California boosters claimed the spring water had medicinal value and would be beneficial for people with rheumatism, Bright's disease, and liver disorders. In 1976, Console's son recalled, "We used to have a tent set up at the spring and doctors would bring patients in to recuperate beside the mineral water. Everything was green and there was a flower garden out there." According to John Console Jr. "city people would drive up in horse-drawn buggies for picnics."

In 1925, during the Prohibition era, John Console was arrested on charges of illegally selling liquor at dances held at the springs. According to the Riverside Daily Press, "When asked at the county jail if he had any remarks to make when he was being booked, Console said, 'Seventeen kids and no money in the bank.'"

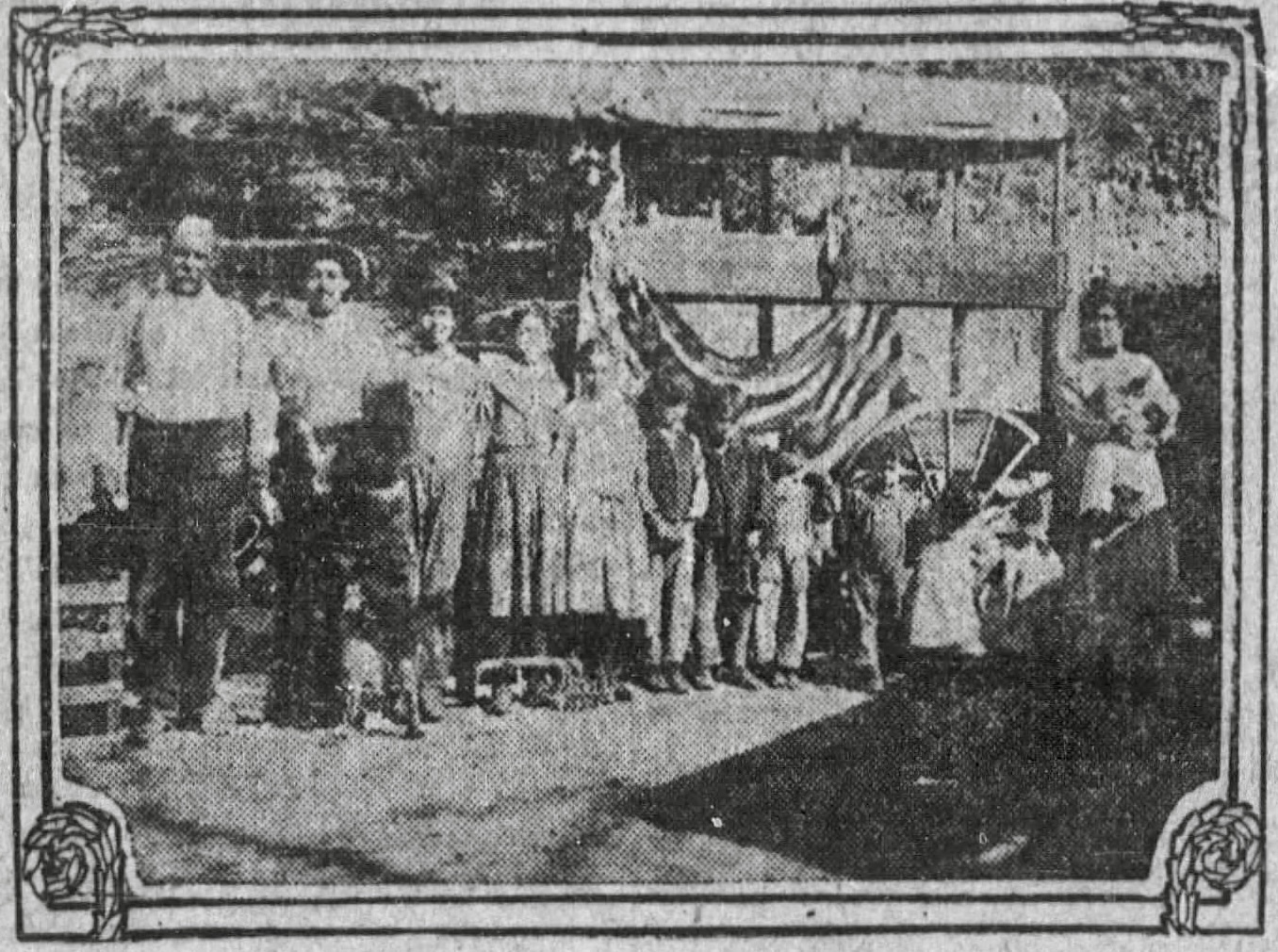
John Console and his family, 1907

== Water profile ==
According to a U.S. government geologist in 1915, "On the granitic slopes a few miles east of Riverside there are a few small springs that have been utilized. One of these, which is known as Console Spring, issues in Reche Canyon, about 9 miles in a direct line east of Riverside, and yields perhaps 7 gallons a minute. The water was placed on the local market in 1906 as a table water. A partial analysis, published in advertising matter, indicates that the water contains about 250 parts per million of solids in solution, sodium, carbonate, and sulphate being the principal constituents."

== See also ==
- Homhoangna – Tongva populated place
