= Bloomington, California =

- Unincorporated community Census-designated place
- Interactive map of Bloomington, California
- Location in the United States
- Coordinates: 34°04′13″N 117°23′45″W
- Country: United States
- State: California
- County: San Bernardino

Area
  - Total: 6.07 sq mi (15.73 km^{2})
  - Land: 6.07 sq mi (15.73 km^{2})
  - Water: 0 sq mi (0.00 km^{2}) 0%
- Elevation: 1,099 ft (335 m)

Population (2020)
  - Total: 24,339
  - Density: 4,008.5/sq mi (1,547.68/km^{2})
- Time zone: UTC-8 (PST)
  - Summer (DST): UTC-7 (PDT)
- ZIP code: 92316
- Area code: 909
- FIPS code: 06-07064
- GNIS feature ID: 1656440

Bloomington is an urban unincorporated community in the Inland Empire region of San Bernardino County, California, United States. The population was 24,339 at the 2020 census, up from 23,851 at the 2010 census. For statistical purposes, the United States Census Bureau has defined Bloomington as a census-designated place (CDP).

Though currently unincorporated, many of the town's political activists are pushing for Bloomington to attain cityhood, while the nearby cities of Rialto and Fontana are attempting to annex the community. The incorporation effort is led by the Bloomington Incorporation Committee.

== History ==
Bloomington was originally developed as part of the land holdings of the Semi-Tropic Land and Water Company, which was formed in 1887.

In 1907, the Riverside Portland Cement Company built a large plant near the Crestmore Quarries (South Bloomington), and to provide transportation for employees built a standard gauge railroad to Riverside. On May 20, 1911, the line was opened to Bloomington. The original community, known as Crestmore, is generally located between Locust Avenue and Larch Avenue, south of Jurupa Avenue, extending to the Riverside County line. The Pacific Electric Crestmore Line (Riverside–Rialto) provided local service for many years.

The Semi-Tropic Land and Water Company (now known as West Valley Water District) laid out the town sites of Bloomington, Rialto, Fontana, and Sansevaine. The town site for Bloomington, after being surveyed in April, 1888, was bounded on the north by Valley Boulevard, on the south by Slover Avenue, on the east by Larch Avenue, and on the west by Linden Avenue.

Part of the community is still rural and many residents continue to keep and raise animals. The cities of Rialto and Colton are both trying to annex much of the land now within Bloomington.

In 1989, full incorporation was not completed due to budget and staff constraints.

In 2007, the Bloomington Incorporation Committee (BIC) applied with the Local Agency Formation Commission for another attempt for incorporation. It failed in late February and early March, when the Local Agency Formation Commission denied an extension that BIC needed in order to pay a $109,000 deposit for feasibility and financial studies.

=== Community Protests of Warehousing ===
In 2022, there was protest by community members, when the county approved to destroy Zimmerman Elementary School in favor of a warehouse.

In 2024, community members protested the demolition of 117 homes in favor of warehouses that were approved by the county supervisors.

In late September 2024, a San Bernardino County Superior Court Judge halted all construction on the Bloomington Business Park, finding that the San Bernardino County officials had failed to conform to state law in its Environmental Review by not sufficiently informing stake-holders (decision-makers and the public) of the environmental consequences of the proposed development. The county will have to re-do the Environmental Review so as to conform to State Law. Community members bemoaned the loss of over 100 homes in a project that may not proceed.

== Geography ==
According to the United States Census Bureau, the CDP has a total area of 6.0 square miles (16 km^{2}), all land.

== Demographics ==
Historical population
Census	Pop.	Note	%±
1970	11,957		—
1980	12,781		6.9%
1990	15,116		18.3%
2000	19,318		27.8%
2010	23,851		23.5%
2020	24,339		2.0%
U.S. Decennial Census; 1850–1870 1880-1890; 1900 1910 1920; 1930 1940 1950; 1960 1970 1980; 1990 2000 2010

Bloomington was first listed as a census designated place in the 1980 U.S. census.

=== Racial and ethnic composition ===
Bloomington CDP, California – Racial and ethnic composition Note: the US Census treats Hispanic/Latino as an ethnic category. This table excludes Latinos from the racial categories and assigns them to a separate category. Hispanics/Latinos may be of any race.
Race / Ethnicity (NH = Non-Hispanic)	Pop 2000	Pop 2010	Pop 2020	% 2000	% 2010	% 2020
White alone (NH)	5,581	3,369	2,159	28.89%	14.13%	8.87%
Black or African American alone (NH)	736	555	551	3.81%	2.33%	2.26%
Native American or Alaska Native alone (NH)	115	70	58	0.60%	0.29%	0.24%
Asian alone (NH)	192	283	246	0.99%	1.19%	1.01%
Native Hawaiian or Pacific Islander alone (NH)	28	39	55	0.14%	0.16%	0.23%
Other race alone (NH)	9	27	80	0.05%	0.11%	0.33%
Mixed race or Multiracial (NH)	221	182	231	1.14%	0.76%	0.95%
Hispanic or Latino (any race)	12,436	19,326	20,959	64.38%	81.03%	86.11%
Total	19,318	23,851	24,339	100.00%	100.00%	100.00%

=== 2020 census ===
As of the 2020 census, Bloomington had a population of 24,339, with a population density of 4,008.4 inhabitants per square mile (1,547.7/km^{2}). 100.0% of residents lived in urban areas, while 0.0% lived in rural areas.

The age distribution was 27.6% under the age of 18, 12.0% aged 18 to 24, 27.7% aged 25 to 44, 23.6% aged 45 to 64, and 9.2% who were 65 years of age or older; the median age was 31.3 years. For every 100 females there were 101.9 males, and for every 100 females age 18 and over there were 100.8 males age 18 and over.

The census reported that 99.6% of the population lived in households, 99 people (0.4%) lived in non-institutionalized group quarters, and 8 people were institutionalized.

There were 5,802 households, of which 52.6% had children under the age of 18 living in them. Of all households, 54.4% were married-couple households, 7.3% were cohabiting couple households, 16.0% had a male householder with no spouse or partner present, and 22.3% had a female householder with no spouse or partner present. About 10.5% of all households were made up of individuals and 4.4% had someone living alone who was 65 years of age or older; the average household size was 4.18. There were 4,936 families (85.1% of all households).

There were 5,925 housing units at an average density of 975.8 units per square mile (376.8 units/km^{2}), of which 5,802 (97.9%) were occupied; 67.0% were owner-occupied and 33.0% were occupied by renters. The homeowner vacancy rate was 0.4% and the rental vacancy rate was 2.1%.

Racial composition as of the 2020 census
Race	Number	Percent
White	5,467	22.5%
Black or African American	614	2.5%
American Indian and Alaska Native	551	2.3%
Asian	288	1.2%
Native Hawaiian and Other Pacific Islander	74	0.3%
Some other race	11,994	49.3%
Two or more races	5,351	22.0%

=== 2023 estimates ===
In 2023, the US Census Bureau estimated that 28.7% of the population were foreign-born. Of all people aged 5 or older, 31.5% spoke only English at home, 67.5% spoke Spanish, 0.3% spoke other Indo-European languages, 0.6% spoke Asian or Pacific Islander languages, and 0.1% spoke other languages. Of those aged 25 or older, 66.1% were high school graduates and 10.2% had a bachelor's degree.

The median household income was $81,220, and the per capita income was $24,296. About 12.0% of families and 15.2% of the population were below the poverty line.

== Public safety ==
Bloomington has been patrolled by the California Highway Patrol and the San Bernardino County Sheriff Department's Fontana Station since 1941.

Bloomington's fire department service is provided by the San Bernardino County Fire Department.

== Transportation ==
The town of Bloomington is served by Omnitrans bus service and Interstate 10 (San Bernardino Freeway). It is also crossed by the Union Pacific Railroad Alhambra Subdivision and home to a hump yard. The Amtrak Sunset Limited uses the same tracks, there is no station in Bloomington and the closest station is in Fontana.

== Education ==
Bloomington is within the Colton Joint Unified School District.Schools include Woodrow Wilson Elementary School, Abraham Lincoln Elementary school, and Crestmore Elementary school.

== Government ==
In the California State Legislature, Bloomington is in the 29th senatorial district, represented by Democrat Eloise Reyes, and in the 50th Assembly district, represented by Democrat Robert Garcia.

In the United States House of Representatives, Bloomington is in California's 33rd congressional district, represented by Democrat Pete Aguilar.

Parks within Bloomington are managed by the Bloomington Recreation and Park District.

== Climate ==
The climate in Bloomington tends to be stable year round:

Monthly normal and record high and low temperatures
Month	Jan	Feb	Mar	Apr	May	Jun	Jul	Aug	Sep	Oct	Nov	Dec	Year
Rec High °F	89	92	98	104	108	112	113	112	113	108	97	93	
Avg high °F	66	68	70	76	80	87	94	94	91	83	74	68	
Avg low °F	42	44	45	48	53	57	61	62	60	53	45	41	
Rec Low °F	24	27	29	33	38	44	49	49	42	32	26	22	
Precip (in)	2.47	2.39	2.19	0.6	0.25	0.1	0.03	0.17	0.26	0.26	0.78	1.17	
