= Willets department store =

Department store in Colton, California

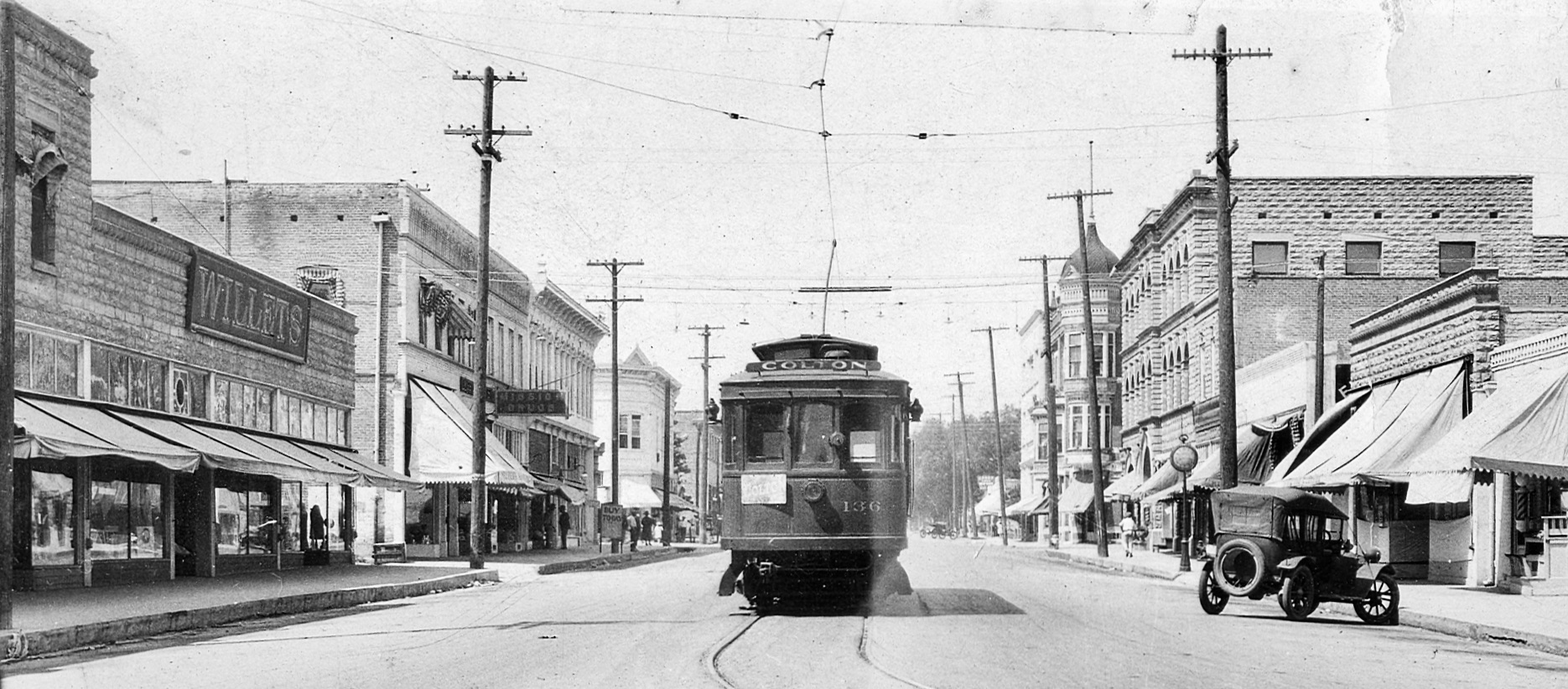
Eighth Street (now La Cadena Dr.), Colton, late 1910s. Willets can be seen on the left. Block demolished to make way for I-10.

Willets or Willet's was a longstanding department store in Colton, California.

In 1906, it was announced that Willet's Department Store opened, having bought out Steck Brothers Clothing Co. However, in advertising, the store notes origins dating back to 1883.

In 1918, the store was sold to Boadway Bros. which after a few month definitively decided to liquidate the stock and close the store in late 1918.

Willet's did reopen for business by February 1922, according to advertisements in the Colton newspapers, at 125–145 North Eighth Street.

In 1951, construction was announced for a new store further north on Eighth Street, as in 1953, a significant block of the historic downtown of Colton was bulldozed to make room for what is now the San Bernardino Freeway. This included the block on the west side of Eighth Street north of J, including the then 70-year-old Helman's Department Store building, originally housing the First National Bank of Colton, on the corner, and the Willet's Department Store building to its north. Helman's also moved to a new location further north.
