= Wilson Elementary School =

Wilson Elementary School may refer to: Alabama Wilson elementary School in Florence Alabama

California

- Wilson Elementary School (San Bernardino, California)
- Wilson Elementary School (Santa Ana, California) - Santa Ana Unified School District
- Wilson Elementary School (Stockton, California)

Oregon

- Wilson Elementary School (Medford, Oregon)

Tennessee

- Wilson Elementary School (Allred, Tennessee)
- Wilson Elementary School (Crawford, Tennessee)
- Wilson Elementary School (Ivyton, Tennessee)
- Wilson Elementary School (Murfreesboro, Tennessee)

Texas

- Baker Montessori School, formerly Woodrow Wilson Elementary School and Woodrow Wilson Montessori School (Houston) - Houston Independent School District
- Wilson Elementary School, formerly Wilson Intermediate School, in unincorporated Harris County, Texas - Aldine Independent School District
- Peggy Wilson Elementary School in unincorporated Harris County, Texas - Cypress-Fairbanks Independent School District

Virginia

- Wilson Elementary School (Fishersville, Virginia)

Wisconsin

- Wilson Elementary School (Sheboygan, Wisconsin)
- Wilson Elementary School (West Allis, Wisconsin)

Ohio

- Wilson Elementary School (Cincinnati, Ohio)
