= Colton, California =

City in California, United States

- City
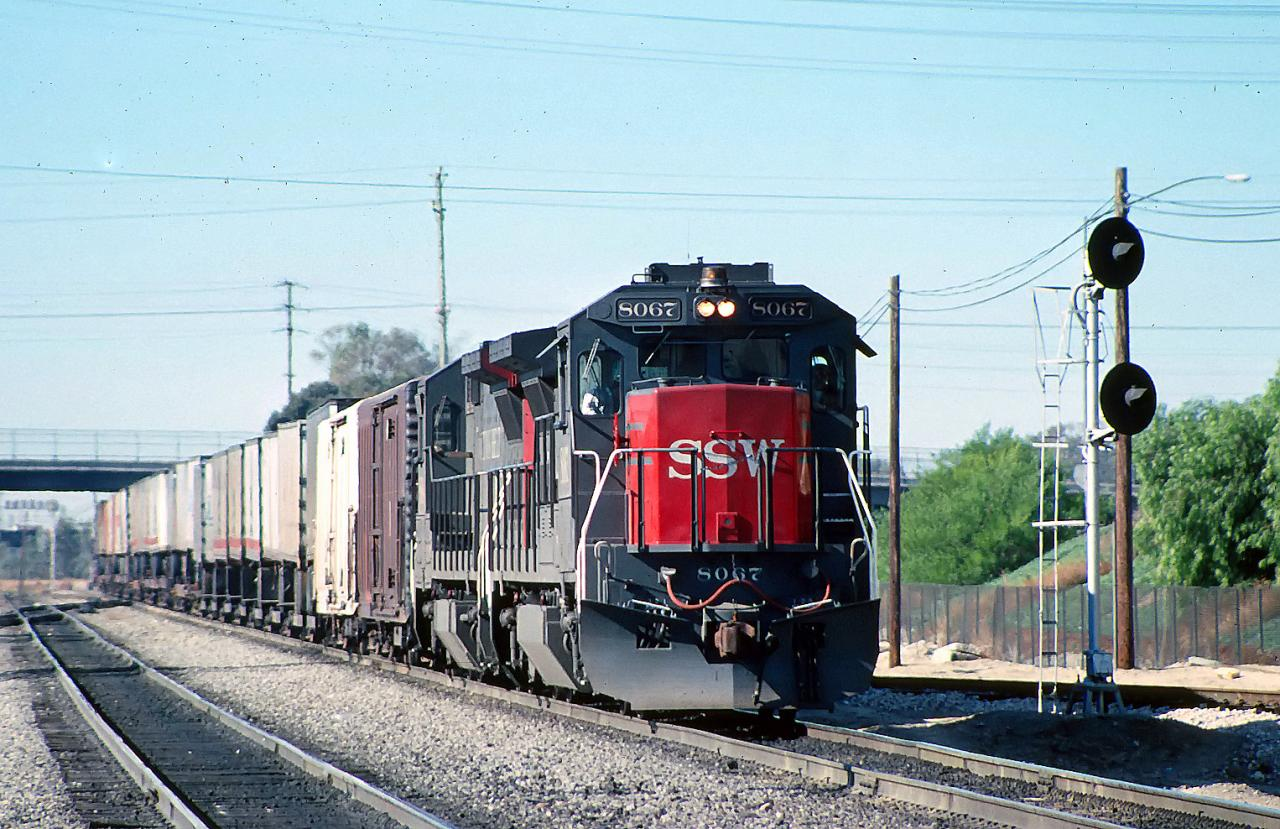
- A St. Louis Southwestern Railway train passes through Colton Junction, 1989

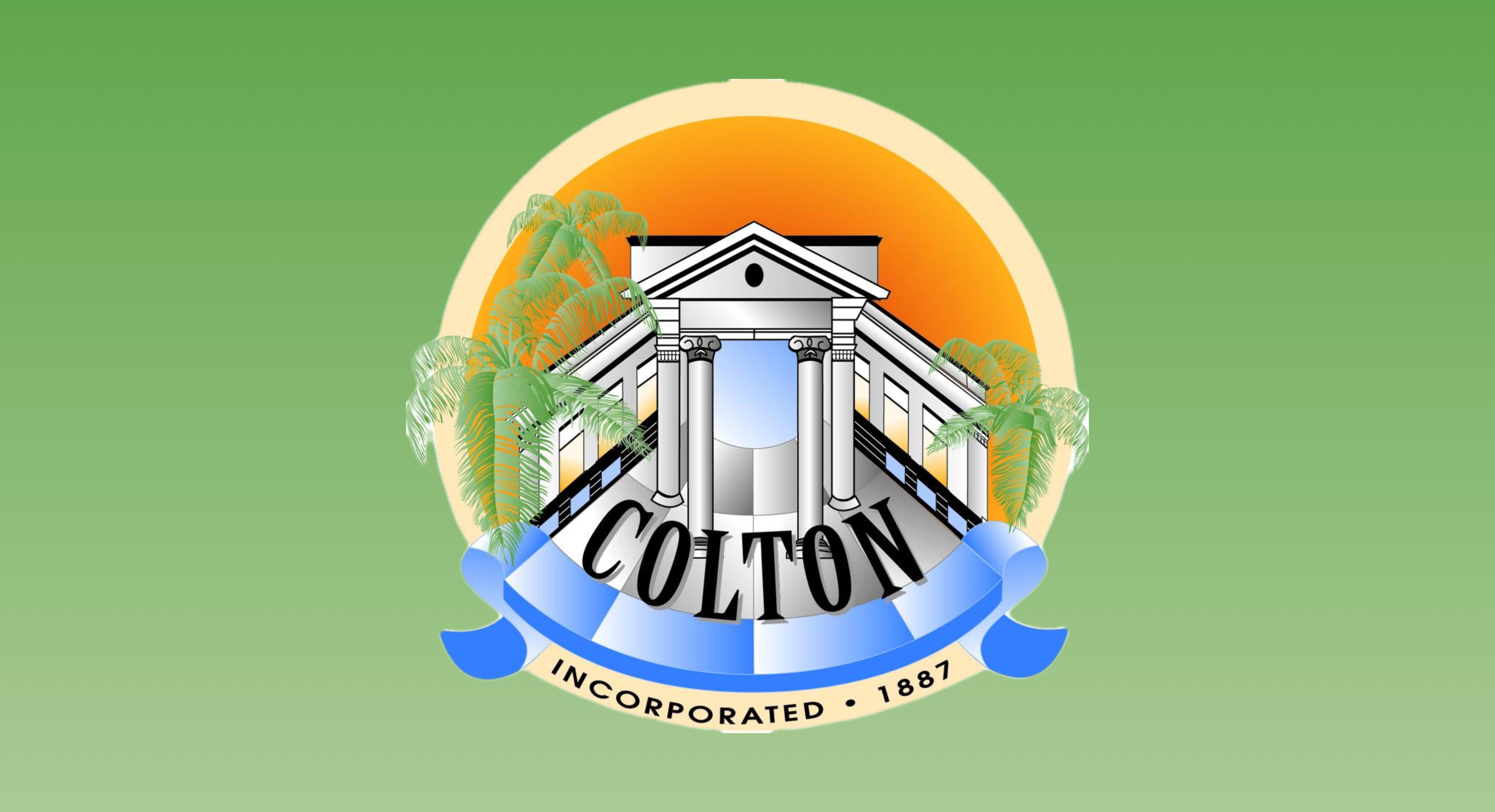
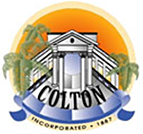
- Flag Seal
- Nickname: Hub City
- Interactive map of Colton, California
- Location in the United States
- Coordinates: 34°04′26″N 117°18′49″W
- Country: United States
- State: California
- County: San Bernardino
- Established: July 11, 1887
- Named for: David D. Colton

Government
  - Mayor: Frank J. Navarro

Area
  - Total: 16.06 sq mi (41.59 km^{2})
  - Land: 15.55 sq mi (40.27 km^{2})
  - Water: 0.51 sq mi (1.32 km^{2}) 3.18%
- Elevation: 1,004 ft (306 m)

Population (2020)
  - Total: 53,909
  - Density: 3,466.9/sq mi (1,338.56/km^{2})
- Time zone: UTC-8 (PST)
  - Summer (DST): UTC-7 (PDT)
- ZIP codes: 92313, 92324
- Area codes: 909, 840, 951
- FIPS code: 06-14890
- GNIS feature IDs: 1652688, 2410200
- Website: www.coltonca.gov

Colton is a city in San Bernardino County, California, United States. Nicknamed "Hub City", Colton is located in the Inland Empire region of the state and is a suburb of San Bernardino, approximately 4 miles (6.4 km) south of the city's downtown. The population of Colton is 53,909 according to the 2020 census, up from 52,154 at the 2010 census.

Colton is the site of Colton Crossing, which was one of the busiest at-grade railroad crossings in the United States. The crossing was installed in 1882 by the California Southern Railroad to cross the Southern Pacific Railroad tracks while building northward from San Diego. As a result of railroad acquisitions and mergers, this became the point at which the Burlington Northern Santa Fe's "Southern Transcontinental Route" crossed the Union Pacific's "Sunset Route". As traffic on each line began to soar in the mid-1990s, fueled largely by the vast increase in imports passing through the ports of Los Angeles and Long Beach, the primitive crossing became a serious bottleneck. On August 28, 2013, the at-grade crossing was officially replaced by a fly-over that raises the east–west UP tracks over the north–south BNSF tracks.

Despite its status as a railroad town, Colton does not have passenger rail service. Passenger trains operated by Amtrak and Metrolink pass through Colton but do not stop there.

== History ==
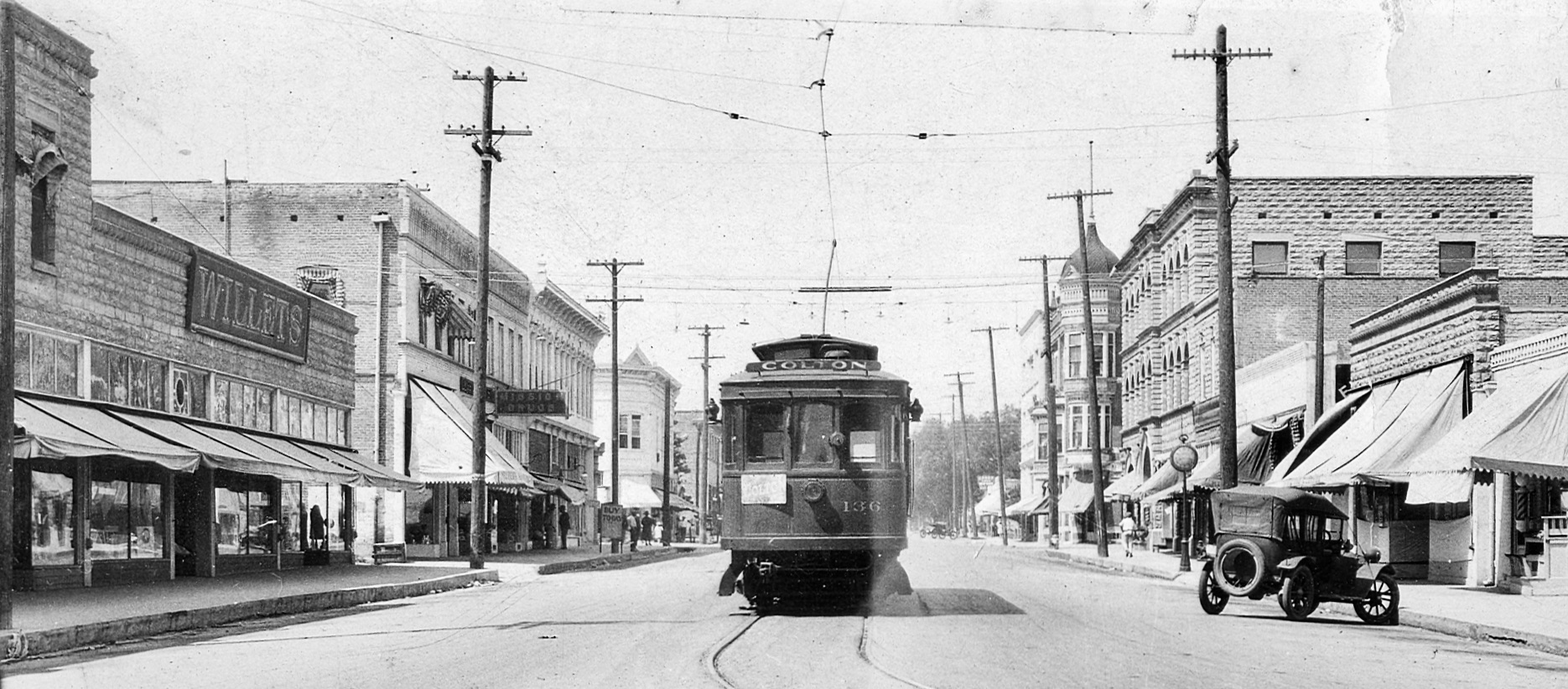
Eighth Street, Colton, late 1910s. Willets department store on the left.

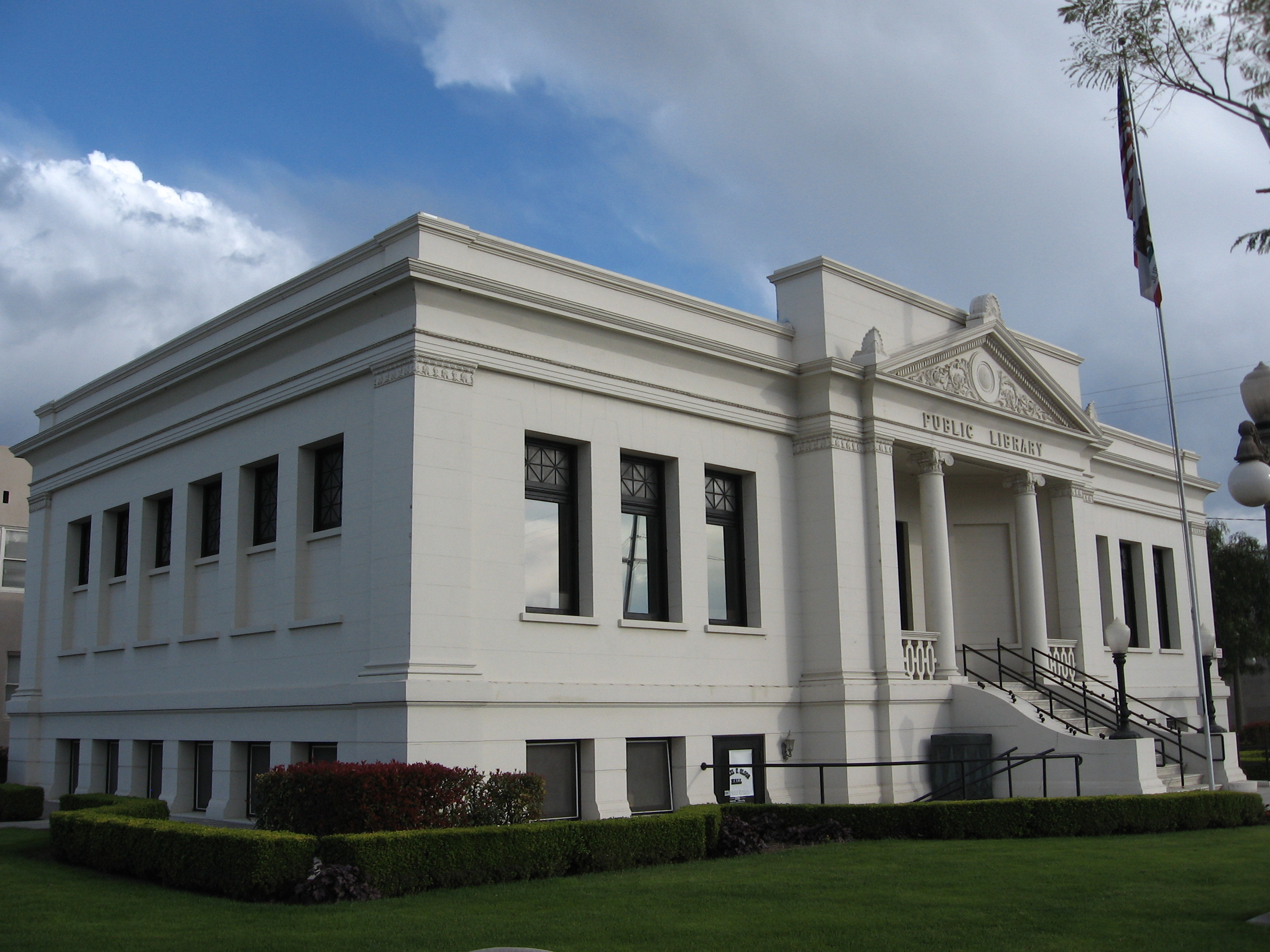
Colton Carnegie Library, now Colton Area Museum

=== Indigenous peoples ===
Before Spanish settlement, the area was inhabited by the Tongva, Serrano, and Cahuilla. The Tongva village of Homhoangna was located in the area that is now Colton, situated near the base of the foothills of Reche Canyon, historically known as Homhoa Canyon, derived from the Tongva language word homhoabit or "hilly place."

=== Spanish and Mexican settlement ===
During the Mission Era, the Mission San Gabriel established a Spanish settlement Politana in 1810, just northeast of what is now Colton. By 1840, Colton was part of two private ranchos, Rancho Jurupa and Rancho San Bernardino. The southwest area of modern-day Colton was known as "Agua Mansa" (Gentle Waters). It had been settled by New Mexico pioneers in 1842. What is currently known as Cooley Ranch was known as Indian Knolls for nearly 100 years. This is because the Indians living in what is now the San Bernardino Valley found refuge on the knolls of the property during the flood of 1862.

=== American settlement ===
The original owner of Cooley Ranch was George Cooley of Kent, England who had moved to Colton in 1853 and who purchased 200 acres at $3.50 an acre along the Santa Ana River the next year. Cooley was chairman of the San Bernardino County Board of Supervisors in San Bernardino County. By 1873, the property had mushroomed into a 400-acre property. Eventually, when property taxes had increased, the property was sold to Villelli Enterprises of La Habra. The city was named after David Douty Colton, who had been a brigadier general of the California State Militia in 1855, prior to the Civil War. He was later the vice president of the Southern Pacific Railroad Company.

Rancho San Bernardino was purchased by Mormon settlers in 1851 who began establishing the neighboring City of San Bernardino. Land disputes between the Mormons and squatters in the area during this period gave rise to Fort Benson on land in present-day Colton.

Colton was created in its modern form when the Southern Pacific Railway was built heading east from Los Angeles in 1875. It was founded in 1875 and incorporated in 1887. Colton was the site of conflict between the Southern Pacific Transportation Company and the Atchison, Topeka and Santa Fe Railway at Colton Crossing when both railroads wanted to cross through the town.

Virgil Earp lived in Colton at 528 West "H" Street where he was the town's first marshal. He resided in Colton from 1883 to 1889. Morgan Earp is buried at Hermosa Cemetery.

=== 1950s to present ===
In 1953, a significant portion of the historic downtown of Colton was bulldozed to make room for the Ramona Freeway, which would later be named the San Bernardino Freeway. This included the block on the west side of Eighth Street north of J, including the then 70-year-old Helman's Department Store building, originally housing the First National Bank of Colton, on the corner and the Willet's Department Store building to its north. Both stores moved to locations further north on Eighth.

== Geography ==
According to the United States Census Bureau, the city has a total area of 16.1 square miles (42 km^{2}). 15.5 square miles (40 km^{2}) of it is land and 0.5 square miles (1.3 km^{2}) of it (3.18%) is water.

Slover Mountain, once the highest point in San Bernardino Valley and the site of the Colton Liberty Flag, is located in the city.

=== Climate ===
According to the Köppen Climate Classification system, Colton has a warm-summer Mediterranean climate, abbreviated "Csa" on climate maps.

== Demographics ==
Historical population
Census	Pop.	Note	%±
1890	1,315		—
1900	1,285		−2.3%
1910	3,980		209.7%
1920	4,282		7.6%
1930	8,014		87.2%
1940	9,686		20.9%
1950	14,465		49.3%
1960	18,666		29.0%
1970	20,016		7.2%
1980	21,310		6.5%
1990	40,213		88.7%
2000	47,662		18.5%
2010	52,154		9.4%
2020	53,909		3.4%
U.S. Decennial Census

=== Racial and ethnic composition ===
Colton city, California – Racial and ethnic composition Note: the US Census treats Hispanic/Latino as an ethnic category. This table excludes Latinos from the racial categories and assigns them to a separate category. Hispanics/Latinos may be of any race.
Race / Ethnicity (NH = Non-Hispanic)	Pop 2000	Pop 2010	Pop 2020	% 2000	% 2010	% 2020
White alone (NH)	9,911	6,803	5,658	20.79%	13.04%	10.50%
Black or African American alone (NH)	5,031	4,648	4,439	10.56%	8.91%	8.23%
Native American or Alaska Native alone (NH)	224	126	163	0.47%	0.24%	0.30%
Asian alone (NH)	2,474	2,430	2,471	5.19%	4.66%	4.58%
Native Hawaiian or Pacific Islander alone (NH)	69	136	116	0.14%	0.26%	0.22%
Other race alone (NH)	69	100	248	0.14%	0.19%	0.46%
Mixed race or Multiracial (NH)	950	872	1,035	1.99%	1.67%	1.92%
Hispanic or Latino (any race)	28,934	37,039	39,779	60.71%	71.02%	73.79%
Total	47,662	52,154	53,909	100.00%	100.00%	100.00%

=== 2020 census ===
As of the 2020 census, Colton had a population of 53,909. The population density was 3,466.8 inhabitants per square mile (1,338.5/km^{2}). The median age was 32.2 years. The age distribution was 26.6% under the age of 18, 10.8% aged 18 to 24, 29.6% aged 25 to 44, 22.6% aged 45 to 64, and 10.3% who were 65 years of age or older. For every 100 females, there were 96.5 males, and for every 100 females age 18 and over, there were 93.8 males.

99.8% of residents lived in urban areas, while 0.2% lived in rural areas. The census reported that 99.0% of the population lived in households, 0.6% lived in non-institutionalized group quarters, and 0.4% were institutionalized.

There were 16,018 households, out of which 44.2% included children under the age of 18. Of all households, 44.7% were married-couple households, 8.6% were cohabiting couple households, 28.4% had a female householder with no spouse or partner present, and 18.2% had a male householder with no spouse or partner present. 17.0% of households were one person, and 5.2% were one person aged 65 or older. The average household size was 3.33. There were 12,298 families (76.8% of all households).

There were 16,632 housing units, of which 96.3% were occupied. Of occupied units, 50.4% were owner-occupied and 49.6% were occupied by renters. 3.7% of housing units were vacant. The homeowner vacancy rate was 0.7% and the rental vacancy rate was 4.8%.

Racial composition as of the 2020 census
Race	Number	Percent
White	13,306	24.7%
Black or African American	4,741	8.8%
American Indian and Alaska Native	1,267	2.4%
Asian	2,601	4.8%
Native Hawaiian and Other Pacific Islander	146	0.3%
Some other race	22,750	42.2%
Two or more races	9,098	16.9%

=== 2023 ACS 5-year estimate ===
In 2023, the US Census Bureau estimated that the median household income was $69,581, and the per capita income was $26,757. About 12.1% of families and 15.3% of the population were below the poverty line.

=== 2010 census ===
At the 2010 census Colton had a population of 52,154. The population density was 3,251.7 inhabitants per square mile (1,255.5/km^{2}). The racial makeup of Colton was 22,613 (43.4%) White (13.0% Non-Hispanic White), 5,055 (9.7%) African American, 661 (1.3%) Native American, 2,590 (5.0%) Asian, 176 (0.3%) Pacific Islander, 18,413 (35.3%) from other races, and 2,646 (5.1%) from two or more races. Hispanic or Latino of any race were 37,039 persons (71.0%).

The census reported that 51,824 people (99.4% of the population) lived in households, 85 (0.2%) lived in non-institutionalized group quarters, and 245 (0.5%) were institutionalized.

There were 14,971 households, 7,826 (52.3%) had children under the age of 18 living in them, 7,167 (47.9%) were opposite-sex married couples living together, 3,233 (21.6%) had a female householder with no husband present, 1,340 (9.0%) had a male householder with no wife present. There were 1,268 (8.5%) unmarried opposite-sex partnerships, and 106 (0.7%) same-sex married couples or partnerships. 2,452 households (16.4%) were one person and 614 (4.1%) had someone living alone who was 65 or older. The average household size was 3.46. There were 11,740 families (78.4% of households); the average family size was 3.86.

The age distribution was 16,671 people (32.0%) under the age of 18, 6,360 people (12.2%) aged 18 to 24, 14,965 people (28.7%) aged 25 to 44, 10,495 people (20.1%) aged 45 to 64, and 3,663 people (7.0%) who were 65 or older. The median age was 28.4 years. For every 100 females, there were 96.0 males. For every 100 females age 18 and over, there were 92.6 males.

There were 16,350 housing units at an average density of 1,019.4 per square mile, of the occupied units 7,766 (51.9%) were owner-occupied and 7,205 (48.1%) were rented. The homeowner vacancy rate was 2.6%; the rental vacancy rate was 9.2%. 28,063 people (53.8% of the population) lived in owner-occupied housing units and 23,761 people (45.6%) lived in rental housing units.

According to the 2010 United States Census, Colton had a median household income of $41,496, with 22.5% of the population living below the federal poverty line.

== Economy ==
According to the city's 2021 Comprehensive Annual Financial Report, the top employers in the city are:

#	Employer	# of Employees
1	Arrowhead Regional Medical Center	3,510
2	Colton Joint Unified School District	2,320
3	Walmart	1,148
4	Lineage Logistics	550
5	County of San Bernardino	427
6	Ashley Furniture	330
7	City of Colton	286
8	Brill, Inc	250
9	Reche Canyon rehabilitation & Health Center	245
10	Stater Bros	

== Government ==
In the California State Senate, Colton is split between the 29th senatorial district, represented by Democrat Eloise Reyes, and the 19th senatorial district, represented by Republican Rosilicie Ochoa Bogh. In the California State Assembly, Colton is in the 50th Assembly district, represented by Democrat Robert Garcia.

In the United States House of Representatives, Colton is in California's 33rd congressional district, represented by Democrat Pete Aguilar.

== Education ==
Most of Colton is in the Colton Joint Unified School District. A portion is in the Rialto Unified School District.

== Notable people ==
- 40 Glocc (born 1979) – rapper
- Jordan Adebayo-Smith (born 2001) – soccer player
- Tyler Ankrum (born 2001) – NASCAR K&N Pro Series East driver
- Allen Bradford (born 1988) – NFL football player
- Adriana Briscoe – National Academy of Sciences member
- Cam Carreon (1937–1987) – baseball player
- Kit Carson (1912–1983) – baseball player
- George Caster (1907–1955) – baseball player
- Dennis Crane – football player, Detroit Lions
- Jay Dahl (1945–1965) – baseball player
- Rich Dauer (1952–2025) – baseball player, World Series champion
- Nicholas Porter Earp (1813–1907) – father of Wyatt Earp
- Wyatt Earp (1848–1929) – frontier lawman
- Virgil Earp (1843–1905) – frontier lawman, older brother of Wyatt Earp; 1st city marshal of Colton
- Morgan Earp (1851–1882) – lawman
- Gene Evans (1922–1998) – actor
- Jada Hart (born 1998) – tennis player
- Rodolfo Hernandez (born 1931) – Medal of Honor recipient, Korean War
- Kat Von D aka Kathrine Drachenburg (born 1982) – tattoo artist, star of LA Ink
- Ken Hubbs (1941–1964) – Chicago Cubs infielder, 1962 Rookie of the Year
- Jim Messina (born 1947) – musician (Buffalo Springfield, Loggins & Messina)
- George T. Sakato (1921–2015) – Medal of Honor recipient, World War II
- Jimmy Smith (born 1988) – NFL football Player
- Jeremy Suarez (born 1990) – actor, The Bernie Mac Show
- Jimmy Webb (born 1946) – songwriter
- Susan Woodstra (born 1957) – silver medalist, 1984 Summer Olympics, women's volleyball
- Shareece Wright (born 1987) – NFL football player
