= Colton Joint Unified School District =

School district in California, United States

District information
- Established: 1872

Other information
- Website: www.cjusd.net

The Colton Joint Unified School District (CJUSD) is a school district in California.

In San Bernardino County, California, the district includes most of Colton, all of Bloomington and Grand Terrace, and small portions of Fontana, Rialto and San Bernardino. The district's territory extends into Riverside County.

== History ==
The district opened in 1872.

== High schools ==
- Bloomington High School (opened in 1962)
- Colton High School (opened in 1895)
- Grand Terrace High School (opened in 2012)
- Slover Mountain High School (opened in 1970)
- Washington Alternative High School (opened in 1975)

== Middle schools ==
- Joe Baca Middle School (opened 2012)
- Colton Middle School (opened 1954)
- Ruth O. Harris Middle School (opened 1993)
- Terrace Hills Middle School (opened 1959)

== Elementary schools ==
- Abraham Lincoln Elementary School (opened 1890s - moved locations multiple times)
- San Salvador (Preschool/ Headstart) (opened early 1900s, 1863 San Salvador district opened)
- Woodrow Wilson Elementary School (opened 1938)
- Mary B. Lewis Elementary School (opened 1948)
- William McKinley Elementary School (opened 1953)
- Ulysses S. Grant Elementary School (opened 1954)
- Ruth Grimes Elementary School (opened 1954)
- Walter Zimmerman Elementary School (opened 1960)
- Gerard A. Smith Elementary School (opened 1966)
- Paul J. Rogers Elementary School (opened 1967)
- Crestmore Elementary School (opened 1980)
- Alice Birney Elementary School (opened 1980)
- Grand Terrace Elementary School (opened 1980)
- Reche Canyon Elementary School (opened 1980)
- Terrace View Elementary School (opened 1980)
- Jurupa Vista Elementary School (opened 1990)
- Cooley Ranch Elementary School (opened 1993)
- Michael D'Arcy Elementary School (opened 1996)
- Sycamore Hills Elementary School (opened 2002)

== See also ==
- List of school districts in San Bernardino County
- List of school districts in California
