= History of Los Angeles =

The modern history of Los Angeles began in 1781 when 44 settlers from central New Spain (modern Mexico) established a permanent settlement in what is now Downtown Los Angeles, as instructed, by Spanish Governor of Las Californias, Felipe de Neve, and authorized by Viceroy Antonio María de Bucareli. After sovereignty changed from Mexico to the United States in 1849, great changes came from the completion of the Santa Fe railroad line from Chicago to Los Angeles in 1885. "Overlanders" flooded in, mostly White Protestants from the Midwest and Upland South.

Los Angeles had a strong economic base in farming, oil, tourism, real estate and movies. It grew rapidly with many suburban areas inside and outside the city limits. Its motion picture industry made the city world-famous, and World War II brought new industry, especially high-tech aircraft construction. Politically the city was moderately conservative, with a weak labor union sector.

Since the 1960s, growth has slowed—and traffic delays have become infamous. Los Angeles was a pioneer in freeway development as the public transit system deteriorated. New arrivals, especially from Mexico and Asia, have transformed the demographic base since the 1960s. Old industries have declined, including farming, oil, military and aircraft, but tourism, entertainment and high-tech remain strong. Over time, droughts and wildfires have increased in frequency and become less seasonal and more year-round, further straining the city's water security.

== Indigenous history ==
By 3000 BCE, the area was occupied by the Hokan-speaking people of the Milling Stone Period who fished, hunted sea mammals, and gathered wild seeds. They were later replaced by migrants—possibly fleeing drought in the Great Basin—who spoke a Uto-Aztecan language called Tongva. The Tongva people called the Los Angeles region Yaa in that tongue.

By the 1700s CE, there were 250,000 to 300,000 native people in California and 5,000 in the Los Angeles basin. The land occupied and used by the covered about 4,000 square miles (10,000 km^{2}). It included the enormous floodplain drained by the Los Angeles and San Gabriel rivers and the southern Channel Islands, including the Santa Barbara, San Clemente, Santa Catalina, and San Nicolas Islands. They were part of a sophisticated group of trading partners that included the Chumash to the west, the Cahuilla and Mojave to the east, and the Juaneños and Luiseños to the south. Their trade extended to the Colorado River and included slavery.

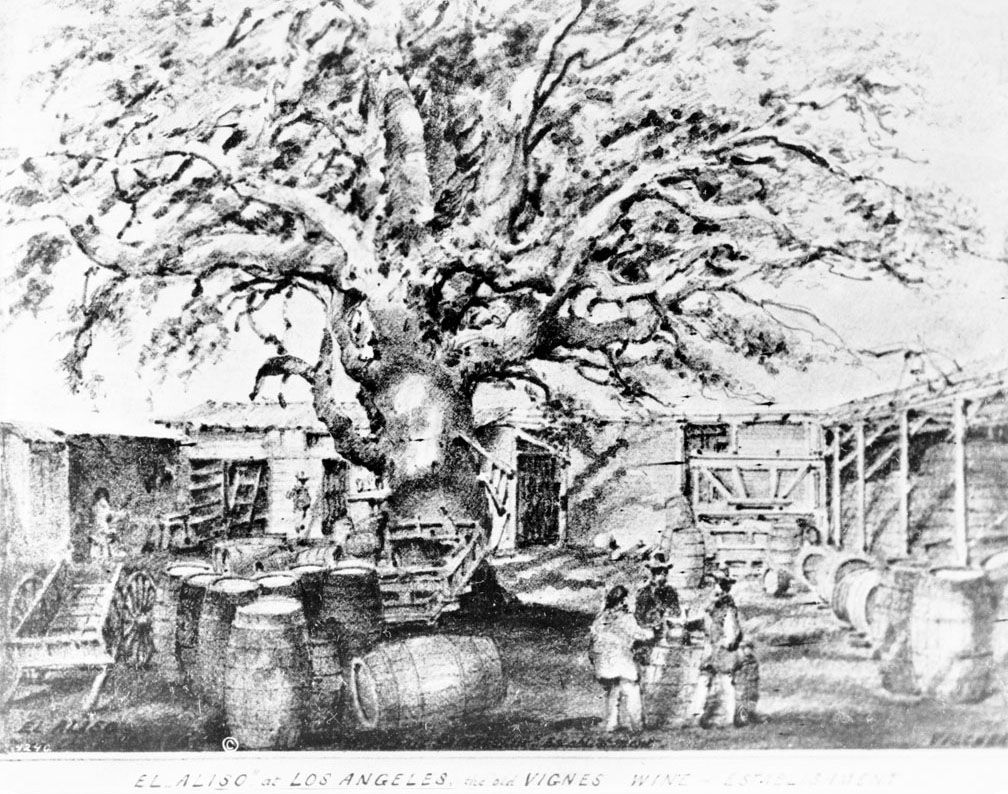
Yaanga was the most prominent Tongva village in the area.

The lives of the Tongva were governed by a set of religious and cultural practices included belief in creative supernatural forces. They worshipped Chinigchinix, a creator god, and Chukit, a female virgin god. Their Great Morning Ceremony was based on a belief in the afterlife. In a purification ritual, they drank tolguache, a hallucinogenic made from jimson weed and salt water. Their language was called Kizh or Kij, and they practiced cremation.

Generations before the arrival of the Europeans, the Tongva had identified and lived in the best sites for human occupation. The survival and success of Los Angeles depended greatly on the presence of a nearby and prosperous Tongva village called Yaanga, which was located by the freshwater artesian aquifer of the Los Angeles River. Its residents provided the colonists with seafood, fish, bowls, pelts, and baskets. For pay, they dug ditches, hauled water, and provided domestic help. They often intermarried with the Mexican colonists.

== Spanish era ==
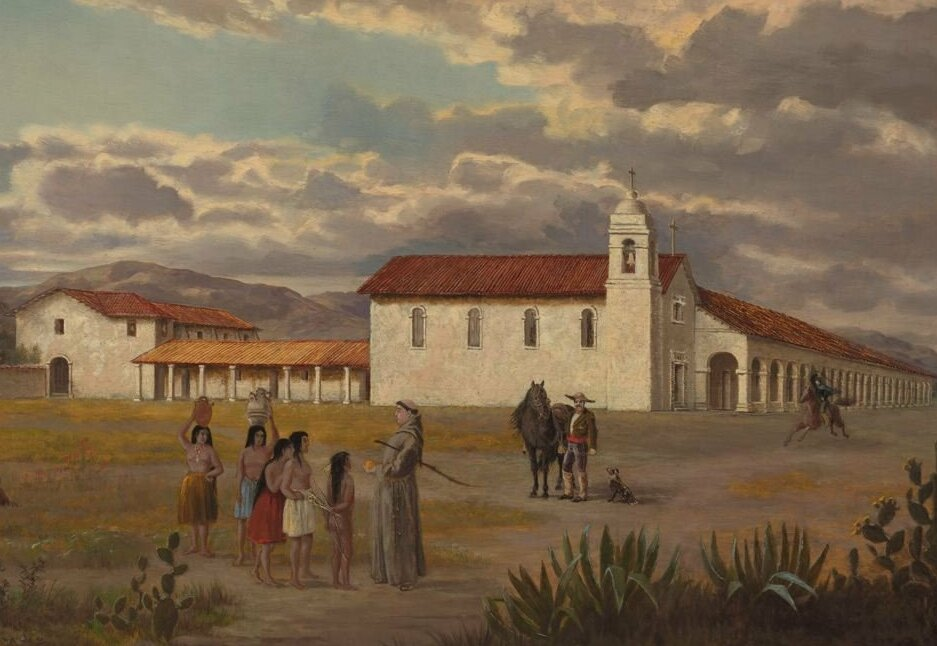
The Spanish founded Mission San Fernando Rey de España in 1797.

In 1542 and 1602, the first Europeans to visit the region were Captain Juan Rodríguez Cabrillo and Captain Sebastián Vizcaíno. The first permanent non-native presence began when the Portolá expedition arrived on August 2, 1769.

=== Plans for the pueblo ===
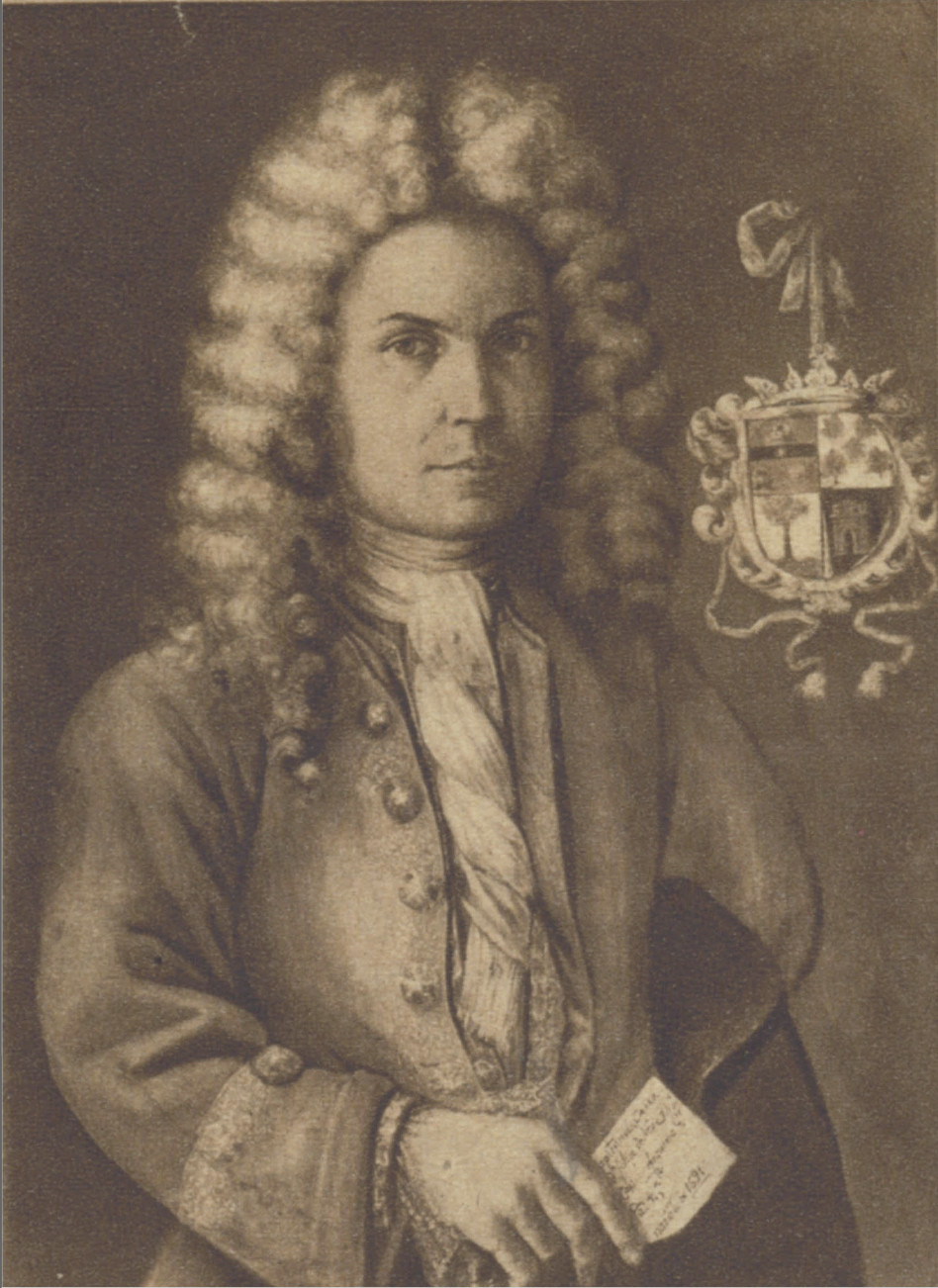
Felipe de Neve, 4th Governor of the Californias, led the Pobladores to found Los Angeles in 1781.

Although Los Angeles was a town that was founded by Mexican families from Sonora, it was the Spanish governor of California who named the settlement.

In 1777, Governor Felipe de Neve toured Alta California and decided to establish civic pueblos for the support of the military presidios. The new pueblos reduced the secular power of the missions by reducing the military's dependence on them. At the same time, they promoted the development of industry and agriculture.

Governor de Neve identified Santa Barbara, San Jose, and Los Angeles as sites for his new pueblos. His plans for them closely followed a set of Spanish city-planning laws contained in the Laws of the Indies promulgated by King Philip II in 1573. Those laws were responsible for laying the foundations of the largest cities in the region at the time, including Los Angeles, San Francisco, Tucson, San Antonio, Sonoma, Monterey, Santa Fe, and Laredo.

The Spanish system called for an open central plaza, surrounded by a fortified church, administrative buildings, and streets laid out in a grid, defining rectangles of limited size to be used for farming (suertes) and residences (solares).

It was in accordance with such precise planning—specified in the Law of the Indies—that Governor de Neve founded the pueblo of San Jose de Guadalupe, California's first municipality, on the great plain of Santa Clara on 29 November 1777.

=== Pobladores ===
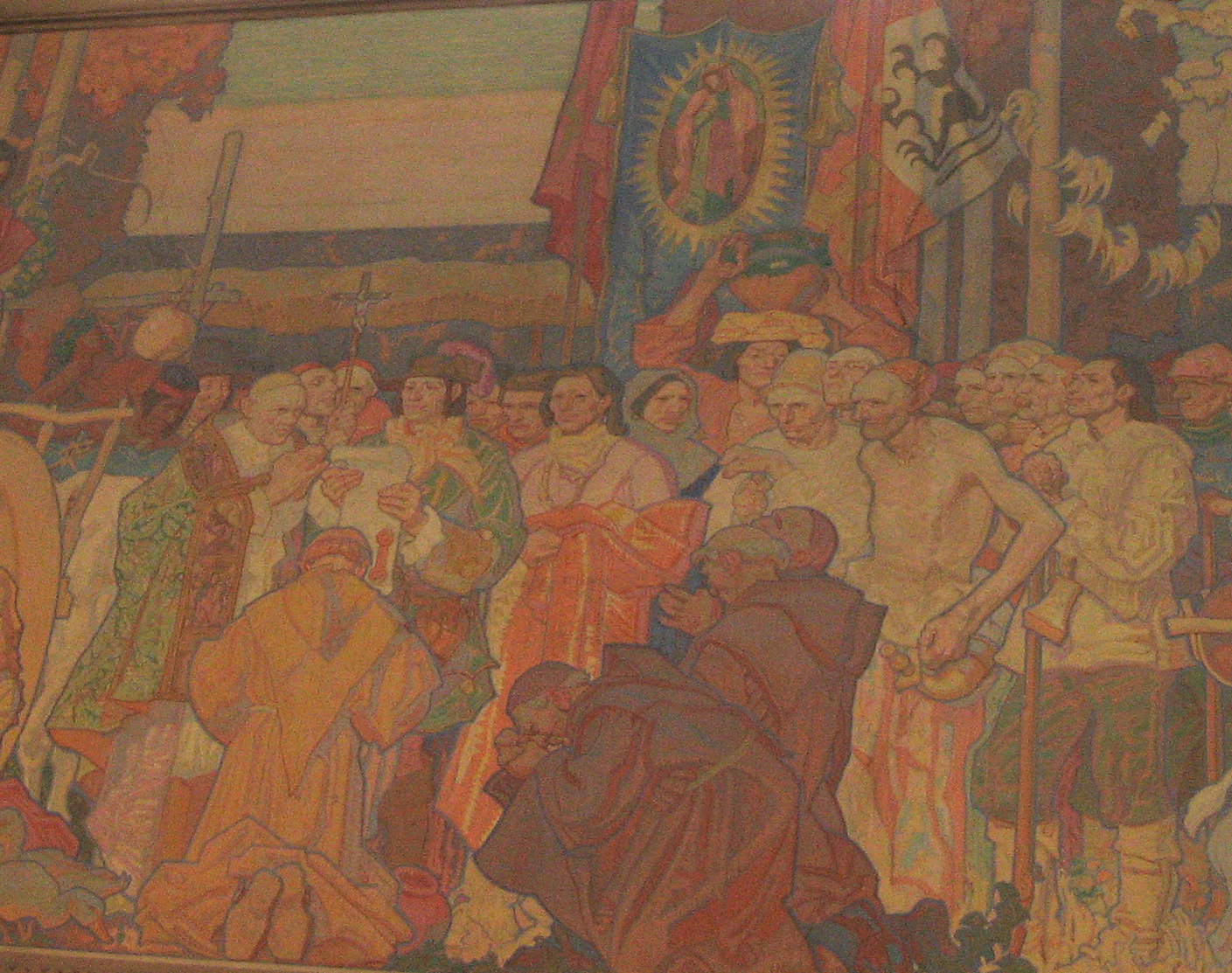
The Founding of Los Angeles mural at the Los Angeles Central Library

The Pobladores ("settlers") is the name given to the 22 adults and 22 children from Sonora who founded Los Angeles. Twenty were of African American or Native American descent. In December 1777, Viceroy Antonio María de Bucareli y Ursúa and Commandant General Teodoro de Croix gave approval for the founding of a civic municipality at Los Angeles and a new presidio, or garrison, at Santa Barbara.

Croix put the California lieutenant governor Fernando Rivera y Moncada in charge of recruiting colonists for the new settlements. He was originally to recruit 55 soldiers, 22 settlers with families and a thousand head of livestock that would include horses for the military. After an exhaustive search that took him to Mazatlán, Rosario, and Durango, Rivera y Moncada recruited only 12 settlers and 45 soldiers. Like the settlers of most towns in New Spain, they had a mix of indigenous and Spanish backgrounds. The Quechan Revolt killed 95 settlers and soldiers, including Rivera y Moncada.

According to Croix's Reglamento, the newly baptized Indians were no longer to reside in the mission but had to live in their traditional rancherías (villages). Governor de Neve's plans for the Indians' role in his new town drew instant disapproval from the mission priests.

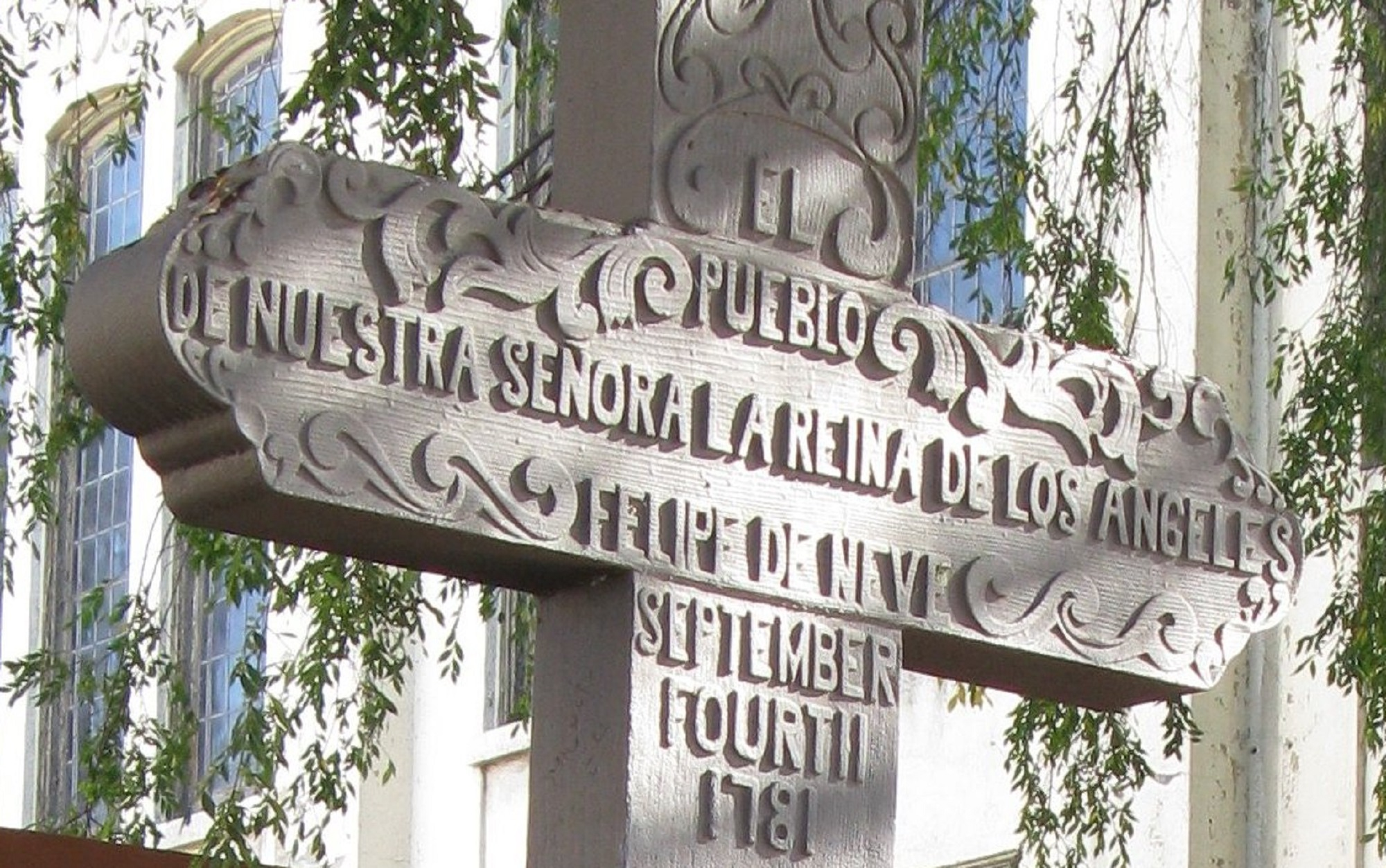
El Pueblo de Los Ángeles Historical Monument at Plaza de Los Ángeles.

Zúñiga's party arrived at the mission on 18 July 1781. Some had smallpox, so all were quarantined a short distance away from the mission. Members of the other party arrived at different times by August. They made their way to Los Angeles and probably received their land before September.

The official date for the founding of the city is September 4, 1781. The families had arrived from New Spain earlier in 1781, in two groups, and some of them had most likely been working on their assigned plots of land since the early summer.

The name first given to the settlement is debated. Historian Doyce B. Nunis has said that the Spanish named it "El Pueblo de la Reina de los Angeles" ("The Town of the Queen of the Angels"). For proof, he pointed to a map dated 1785, where that phrase was used. Frank Weber, the diocesan archivist, replied, however, that the name given by the founders was "El Pueblo de Nuestra Señora de los Angeles de Porciuncula", or "the town of Our Lady of the Angels of Porciuncula," and that the map was in error.

=== Spanish pueblo ===
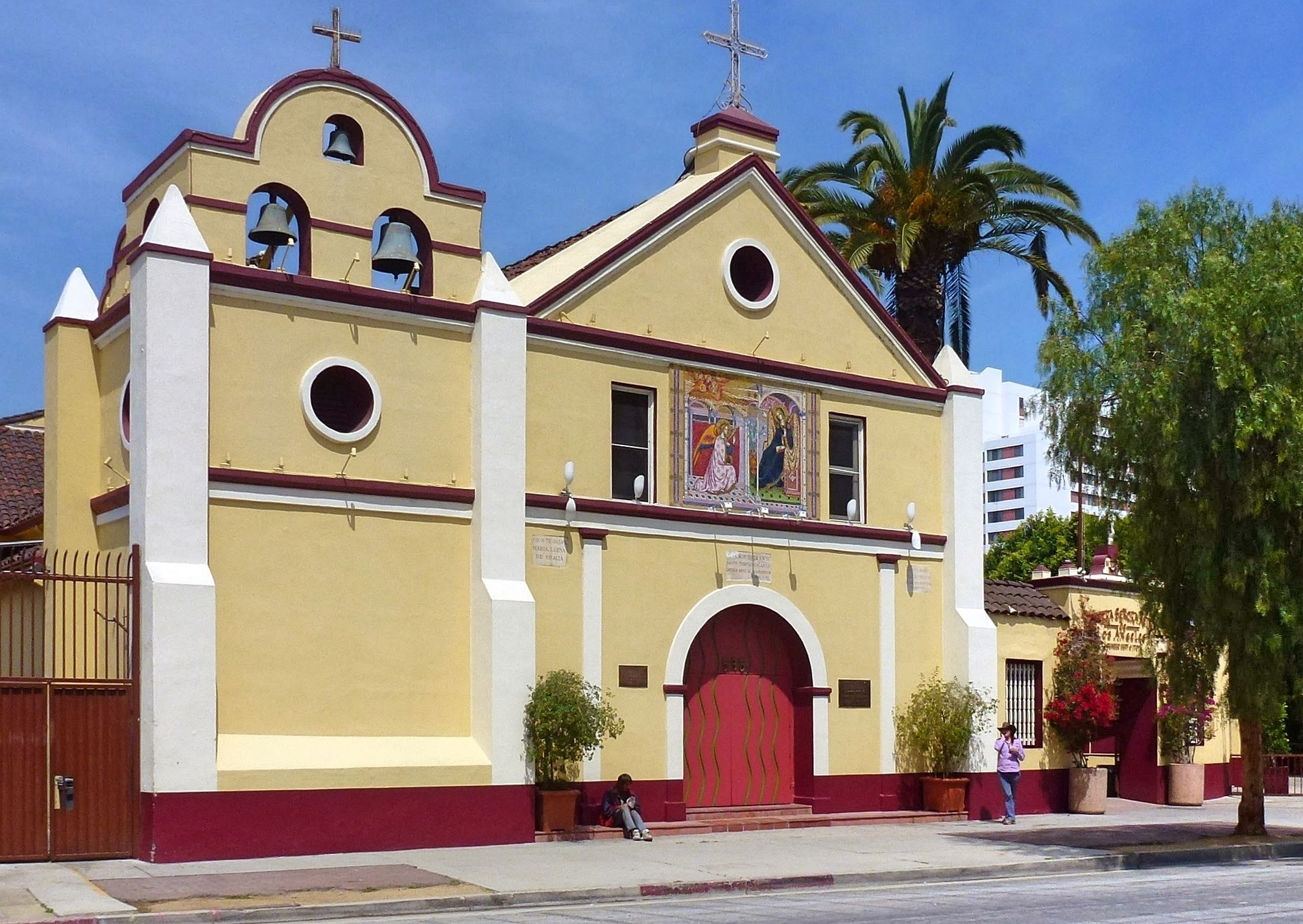
The Iglesia de Nuestra Señora la Reina de los Ángeles, built in 1814 over the ruins of the 1784 Asistencia de Los Ángeles.

The town grew as soldiers and other settlers came into town and stayed. In 1784 a chapel was built on the original Plaza. The original Plaza was located a block north and west of the present one — its southeast corner being roughly where the northwesternmost point of the present plaza is, at the former intersection of Upper Main and Marchessault streets. It was also oriented diagonally, i.e. at precisely a 45-degree angle to the four compass points. The pobladores were given title to their land two years later. By 1800, there were 29 buildings that surrounded the Plaza, flat-roofed, one-story adobe buildings with thatched roofs made of tule. By 1821, Los Angeles had grown into a self-sustaining farming community, the largest in Southern California.

The Spanish land grant to the city lands of Los Angeles was roughly a square of five miles (8.0 km) on each side, for an area of four square Spanish leagues, with the boundaries corresponding to present-day Fountain Avenue, Indiana Street, Exposition Boulevard and Hoover Street. Each settler received four rectangles of land, suertes, for farming, two irrigated plots and two dry ones. When the settlers arrived, the Los Angeles floodplain was heavily wooded with willows and oaks. The Los Angeles River flowed all year. Wildlife was plentiful, including deer and black bears, and even an occasional grizzly bear. There were abundant wetlands and swamps. Steelhead trout and salmon swam the rivers.

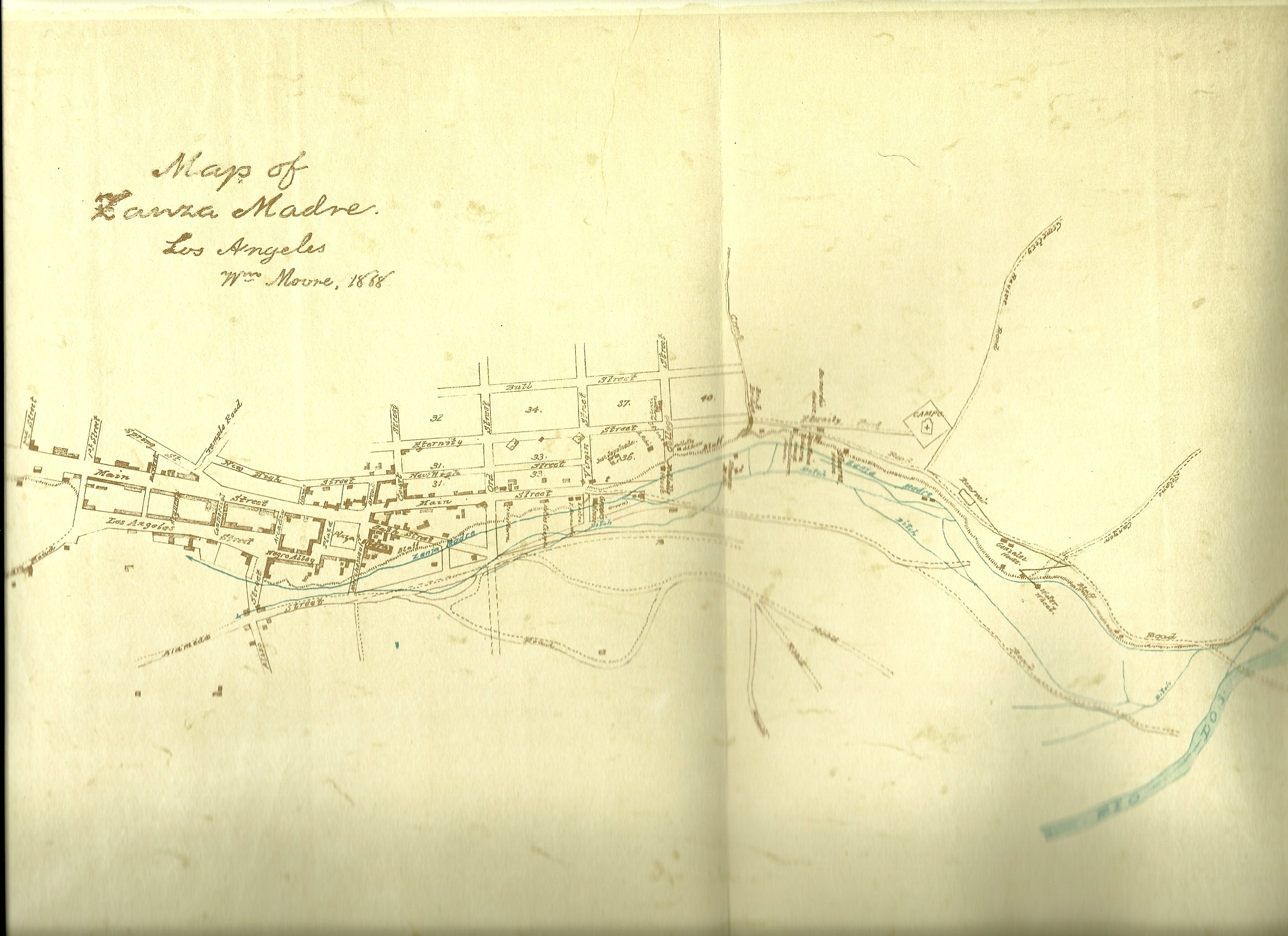
Map of the Zanja Madre, an irrigation system created by the Spanish. It was maintained by the Zanjero of Los Angeles.

The first settlers built a water system consisting of ditches (zanjas) leading from the river through the middle of town and into the farmlands. Indians were employed to haul fresh drinking water from a special pool farther upstream. The city was first known as a producer of fine wine grapes. The raising of cattle and the commerce in tallow and hides came later.

Because of the great economic potential for Los Angeles, the demand for Indian labor grew rapidly. Yaanga began attracting Indians from the Channel Islands and as far away as San Diego and San Luis Obispo. The village began to look like a refugee camp. Unlike the missions, the pobladores paid Indians for their labor. In exchange for their work as farm workers, vaqueros, ditch diggers, water haulers, and domestic help; they were paid in clothing and other goods as well as cash and alcohol. The pobladores bartered with them for prized sea-otter and seal pelts, sieves, trays, baskets, mats, and other woven goods. This commerce greatly contributed to the economic success of the town and the attraction of other Indians to the city.

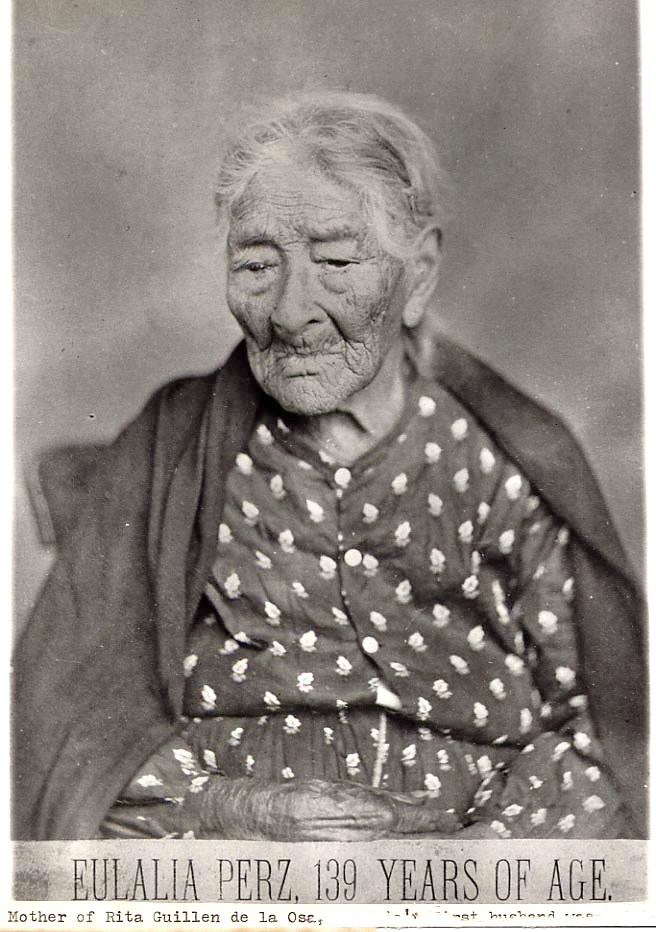
Eulalia Pérez de Guillén Mariné (c. 1766–1878) reportedly lived to the age of 112, living through the Spanish, Mexican, and early American eras in California.

During the 1780s, San Gabriel Mission became the object of an Indian revolt. The mission had expropriated all the suitable farming land; the Indians found themselves abused and forced to work on lands that they once owned. A young Indian healer, Toypurina, began touring the area, preaching against the injustices suffered by her people. She won over four rancherías and led them in an attack on the mission at San Gabriel. The soldiers were able to defend the mission, and arrested 17, including Toypurina.

In 1787, Governor Pedro Fages outlined his "Instructions for the Corporal Guard of the Pueblo of Los Angeles." The instructions included rules for employing Indians, not using corporal punishment, and protecting the Indian rancherías. As a result, Indians found themselves with more freedom to choose between the benefits of the missions and the pueblo-associated rancherías.

In 1795, Sergeant Pablo Cota led an expedition from the Simi Valley through the Conejo-Calabasas region and into the San Fernando Valley. His party visited the rancho of Francisco Reyes. They found the local Indians hard at work as vaqueros and caring for crops. Padre Vincente de Santa Maria was traveling with the party and made these observations:

All of pagandom (Indians) is fond of the pueblo of Los Angeles, of the rancho of Reyes, and of the ditches (water system). Here we see nothing but pagans, clad in shoes, with sombreros and blankets, and serving as muleteers to the settlers and rancheros, so that if it were not for the gentiles there were neither pueblos nor ranches. These pagan Indians care neither for the missions nor for the missionaries.

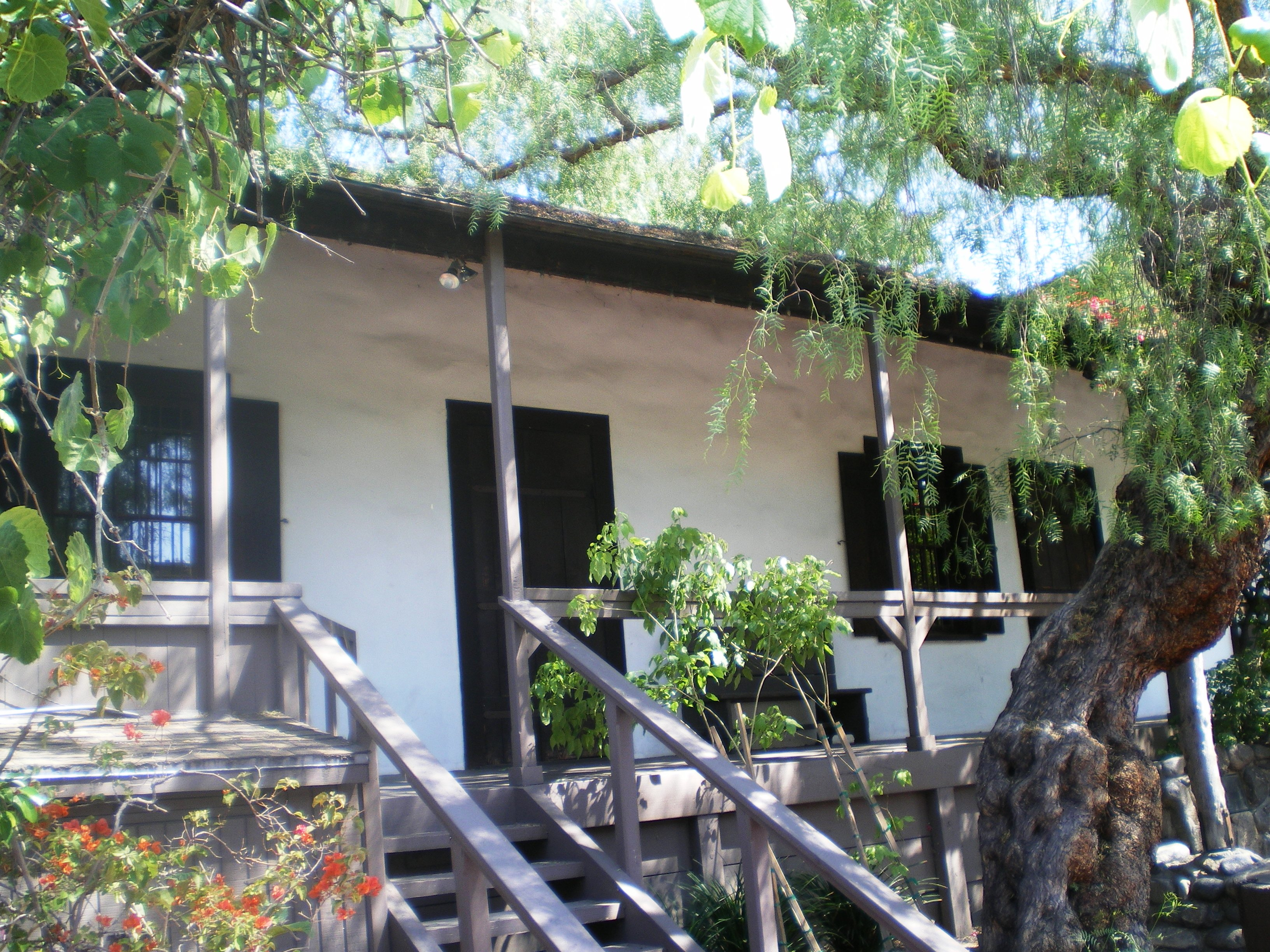
The Ávila Adobe, on Calle Olvera, is the oldest residence in Los Angeles, built in 1818 by Francisco Ávila.

Not only economic ties but also marriage drew many Indians into the life of the pueblo. In 1784, only three years after the founding, the first recorded marriages in Los Angeles took place. The two sons of settler Basilio Rosas, Maximo and José Carlos, married two young Indian women, María Antonia and María Dolores.

The construction on the Plaza of La Iglesia de Nuestra Señora de Los Ángeles took place between 1818 and 1822, much of it with Indian labor. The new church completed Governor de Neve's planned transition of authority from mission to pueblo. The angelinos no longer had to make the bumpy 11-mile (18 km) ride to Sunday Mass at Mission San Gabriel.

In 1811, the population of Los Angeles had increased to more than five hundred persons, of which ninety-one were heads of families.

In 1820, the route of El Camino Viejo was established from Los Angeles, over the mountains to the north and up the west side of the San Joaquin Valley to the east side of San Francisco Bay.

== Mexican era ==
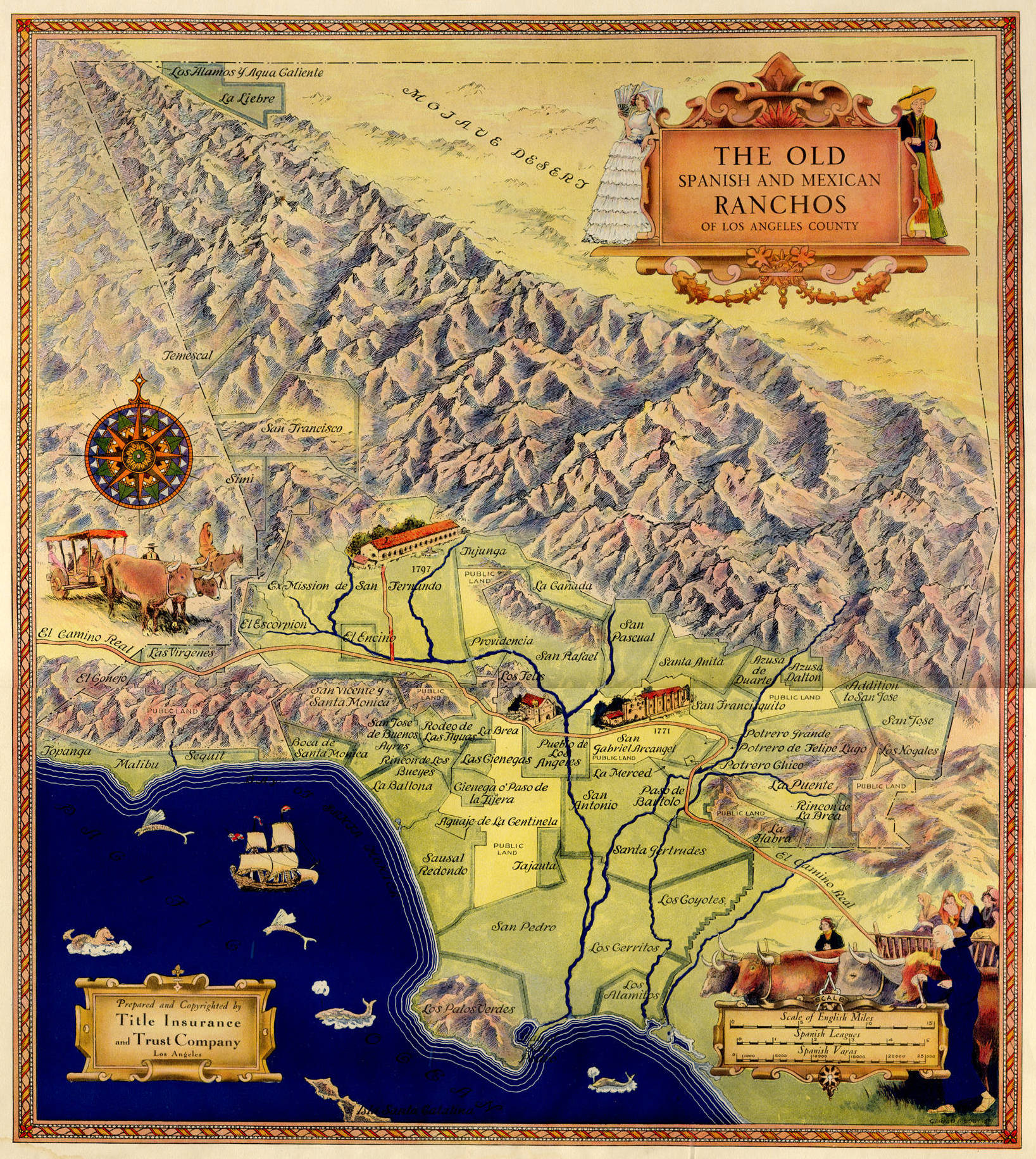
Map of the Spanish and Mexican ranchos of Los Angeles County showing the city lands and limits of the Pueblo of Los Angeles at center.

Mexico's independence from Spain on September 28, 1821, was celebrated with great festivity throughout Alta California. No longer subjects of the king, people were now ciudadanos, citizens with rights under the law. In the plazas of Monterey, Santa Barbara, Los Angeles, and other settlements, people swore allegiance to the new government, the Spanish flag was lowered, and the flag of independent Mexico raised.

Independence brought other advantages, including economic growth. There was a corresponding increase in population as more Indians were assimilated and others arrived from America, Europe, and other parts of Mexico. Before 1820, there were just 650 people in the pueblo. By 1841, the population nearly tripled to 1,680.

=== Secularization of the missions ===
During the rest of the 1820s, the agriculture and cattle ranching expanded as did the trade in hides and tallow. The new church was completed, and the political life of the city developed. Los Angeles was separated from Santa Barbara administration. The system of ditches which provided water from the river was rebuilt. In 1827 Jonathan Temple and John Rice opened the first general store in the pueblo, soon followed by J. D. Leandry. Trade and commerce further increased with the secularization of the California missions by the Mexican Congress in 1833. Extensive mission lands suddenly became available to government officials, ranchers, and land speculators. The governor made more than 800 land grants during this period, including a grant of over 33,000-acres in 1839 to Francisco Sepúlveda which was later developed as the westside of Los Angeles.

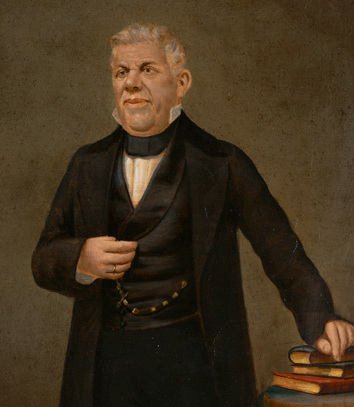
Californio statesman Pío Pico, who served as the last Mexican governor of California, played an influential role in the development of Los Angeles in the late Mexican and early American eras.

Much of this progress, however, bypassed the Indians of the traditional villages who were not assimilated into the mestizo culture. Being regarded as minors who could not think for themselves, they were increasingly marginalized and relieved of their land titles, often by being drawn into debt or alcohol.

In 1835, the Mexican Congress declared Los Angeles a city, making it the official capital of Alta California. It was now the region's leading city. The same period also saw the arrival of many foreigners from the United States and Europe. They played a pivotal role in the U.S. takeover. Early California settler John Bidwell included several historical figures in his recollection of people he knew in March 1845.

It then had probably two hundred and fifty people, of whom I recall Don Abel Stearns, John Temple, Captain Alexander Bell, William Wolfskill, Lemuel Carpenter, David W. Alexander; also of Mexicans, Pio Pico (governor), Don Juan Bandini, and others.

Upon arriving in Los Angeles in 1831, Jean-Louis Vignes bought 104 acres (0.42 km^{2}) of land located between the original Pueblo and the banks of the Los Angeles River. He planted a vineyard and prepared to make wine. He named his property El Aliso after the centuries-old tree found near the entrance. The grapes available at the time, of the Mission variety, were brought to Alta California by the Franciscan Brothers at the end of the 18th century. They grew well and yielded large quantities of wine, but Jean-Louis Vignes was not satisfied with the results.

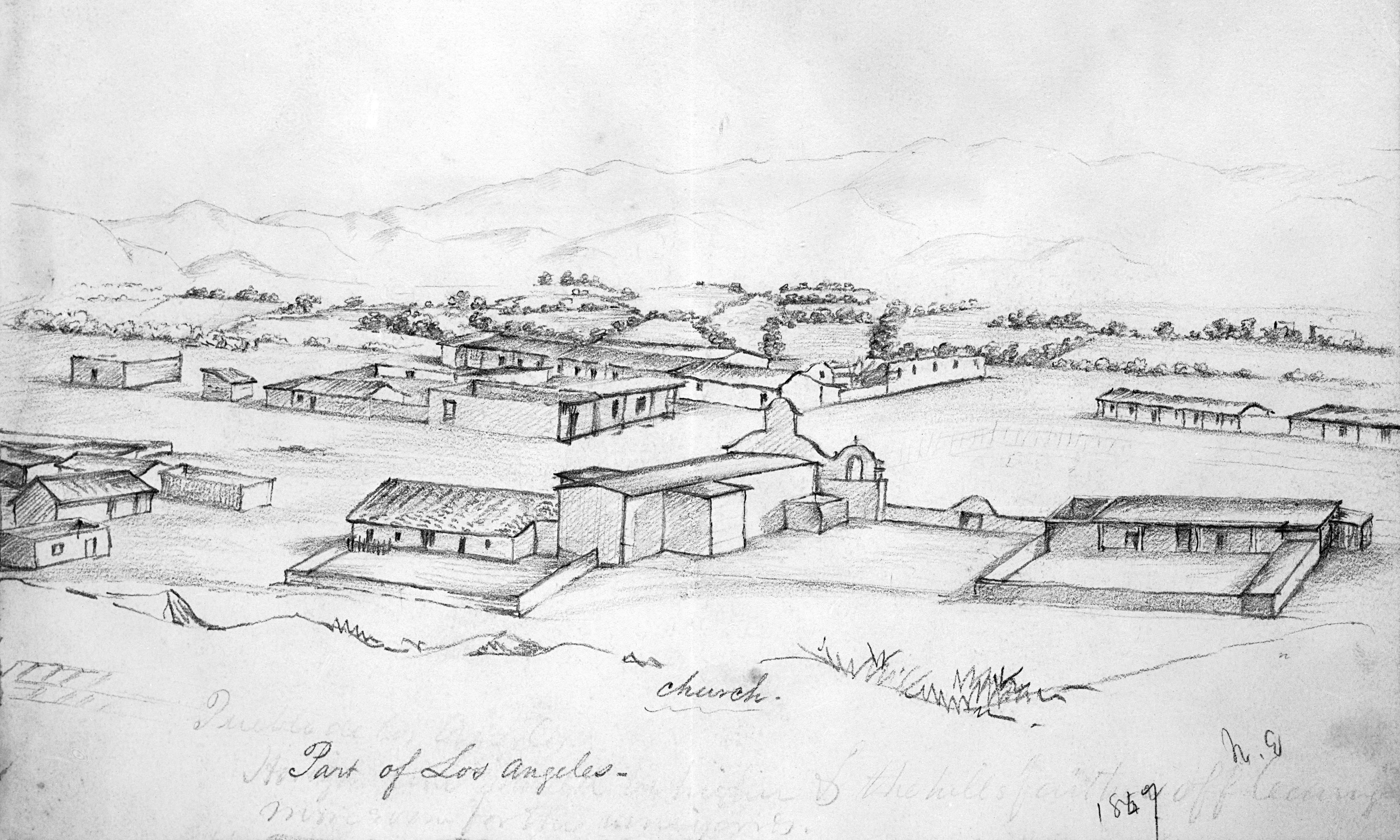
Depiction of Los Angeles in 1847, near the end of Mexican rule in the city.

In 1840, Jean-Louis Vignes made the first recorded shipment of California wine. The Los Angeles market was too small for his production, and he loaded a shipment on the Monsoon, bound for Northern California. By 1842, he made regular shipments to Santa Barbara, Monterey and San Francisco. By 1849, El Aliso, was the most extensive vineyard in California. Vignes owned over 40,000 vines and produced 150,000 bottles, or 1,000 barrels, per year.

In 1836, the Indian village of Yaanga was relocated near the future corner of Commercial and Alameda Streets. In 1845, it was relocated again to present-day Boyle Heights. With the coming of the U.S. citizens, disease took a great toll among Indians. Self-employed Indians were not allowed to sleep over in the city. They faced increasing competition for jobs as more Mexicans moved into the area and took over the labor force. Those who loitered or were drunk or unemployed were arrested and auctioned off as laborers to those who paid their fines. They were often paid for work with liquor, which only increased their problems.

=== U.S. Conquest of California ===
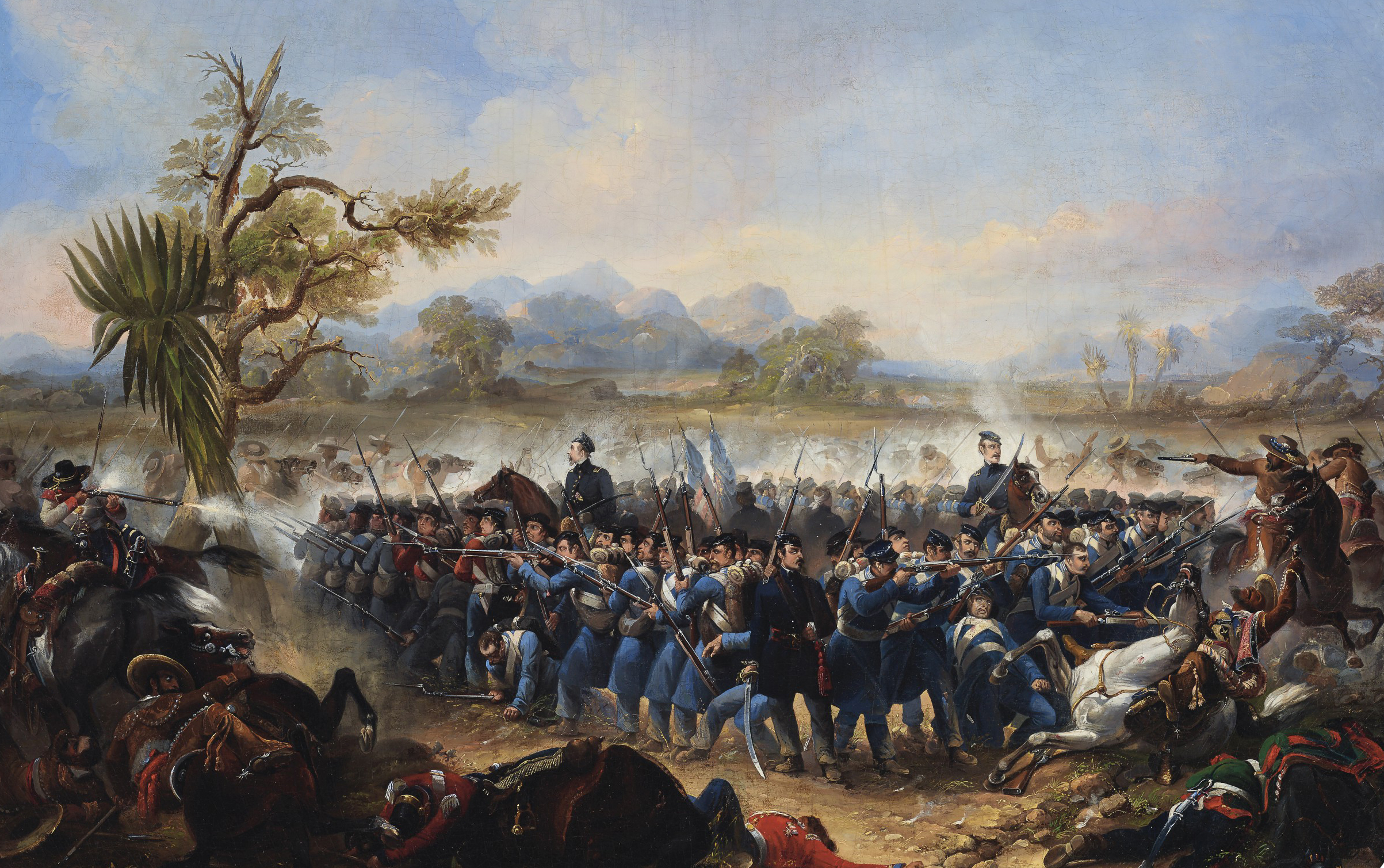
The 1847 Battle of Río San Gabriel was a decisive victory of American forces against the Californios during the U.S. conquest of California.

In May 1846, the Mexican–American War started, soon leading to the American conquest of California. Because of Mexico's inability to defend its northern territories, California was exposed to invasion. On August 13, 1846, Commodore Robert F. Stockton, accompanied by John C. Frémont, seized the town; Governor Pico had fled to Mexico. From Stockton and Frémont until late 1849, all of California had a military governor. After three weeks of occupation, Stockton left, leaving Lieutenant Archibald H. Gillespie in charge. Subsequent dissatisfaction with Gillespie and his troops led to an uprising.

A force of 300 locals drove the Americans out, ending the first phase of the Battle of Los Angeles. Further small skirmishes took place. Stockton regrouped in San Diego and marched north with six hundred troops while Frémont marched south from Monterey with 400 troops. After a few skirmishes outside the city, the two forces entered Los Angeles, this time without bloodshed. Andrés Pico was in charge; he signed the Treaty of Cahuenga, also known as the Capitulation of Cahuenga, on 13 January 1847, ending the California phase of the Mexican–American War. The Treaty of Guadalupe Hidalgo, signed on 2 February 1848, ended the war and ceded California to the U.S.

== Early American era ==
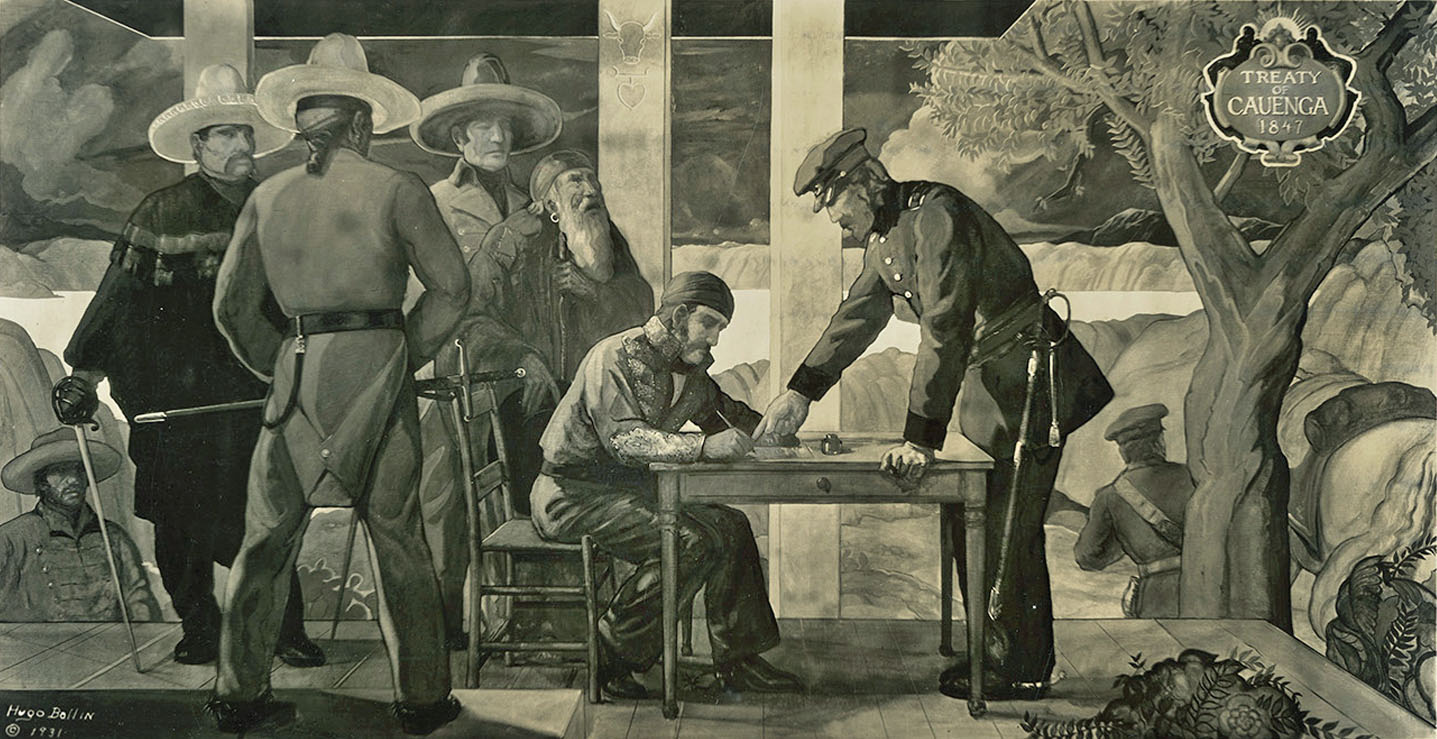
The Treaty of Cahuenga, signed at Campo de Cahuenga in 1847, by Californio Andrés Pico and American John C. Frémont, ended the U.S. Conquest of California.

According to historian Mary P. Ryan, "The U.S. army swept into California with the surveyor as well as the sword and quickly translated Spanish and Mexican practices into cartographic representations." Under colonial law, land held by grantees was not disposable. It reverted to the government. It was determined that under U.S. property law, lands owned by the city were disposable. Also, the diseños (property sketches) held by residents did not secure title in an American court.

California's new military governor Bennett C. Riley ruled that land could not be sold that was not on a city map. In 1849, Lieutenant Edward Ord surveyed Los Angeles to confirm and extend the streets of the city. His survey put the city into the real-estate business, creating its first real-estate boom and filling its treasury. Street names were changed from Spanish to English. Further surveys and street plans replaced the original plan for the pueblo with a new civic center south of the Plaza and a new use of space.

The fragmentation of Los Angeles real estate on the Anglo-Mexican axis had begun. Under the Spanish system, the residences of the power-elite clustered around the Plaza in the center of town. In the new U.S. system, the power elite resided in the outskirts. The emerging minorities, including the Chinese, Italians, French, and Russians, joined with the Mexicans near the Plaza.

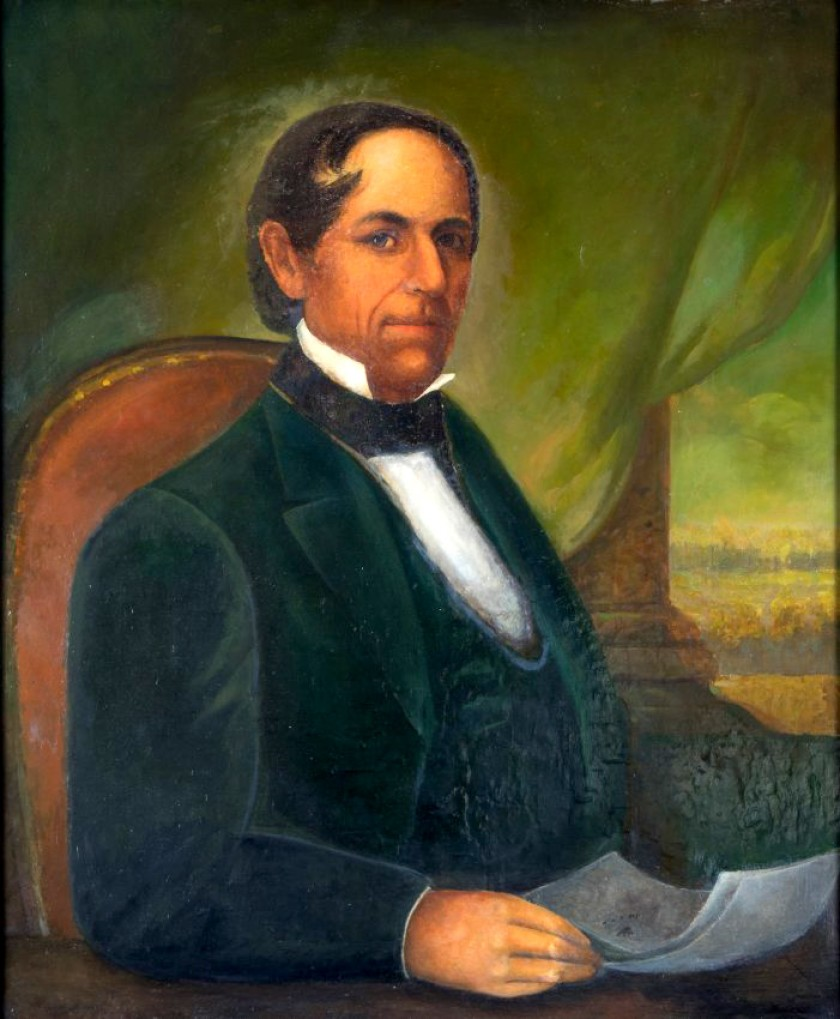
Manuel Domínguez, a signer of the Constitution of California, represented Los Angeles at the Monterey Constitutional Convention of 1849.

In 1848, the gold discovered in Coloma first brought thousands of miners from Sonora in northern Mexico on the way to the gold fields. So many of them settled in the area north of the Plaza that it came to be known as "Sonoratown".

During the Gold Rush years in northern California, Los Angeles became known as the "Queen of the Cow Counties" for its role in supplying beef and other foodstuffs to hungry miners in the north. Among the cow counties, Los Angeles County had the largest herds in the state followed closely by Santa Barbara and Monterey Counties.

With the temporary absence of a legal system, the city quickly was submerged in lawlessness. Many of the New York regiment disbanded at the end of the war and charged with maintaining order were thugs and brawlers. They roamed the streets joined by gamblers, outlaws, and prostitutes driven out of San Francisco and mining towns of the north by Vigilance Committees or lynch mobs. Los Angeles came to be known as the "toughest and most lawless city west of Santa Fe."

Some of the residents resisted the new powers by resorting to banditry against the gringos. In 1856, Juan Flores threatened Southern California with a full-scale revolt. He was hanged in Los Angeles in front of 3,000 spectators. Tiburcio Vasquez, a legend in his own time among the Mexican-born population for his daring feats against the Anglos, was captured in present-day Santa Clarita, California, on May 14, 1874. He was found guilty of two counts of murder by a San Jose jury in 1874, and was hanged there in 1875.

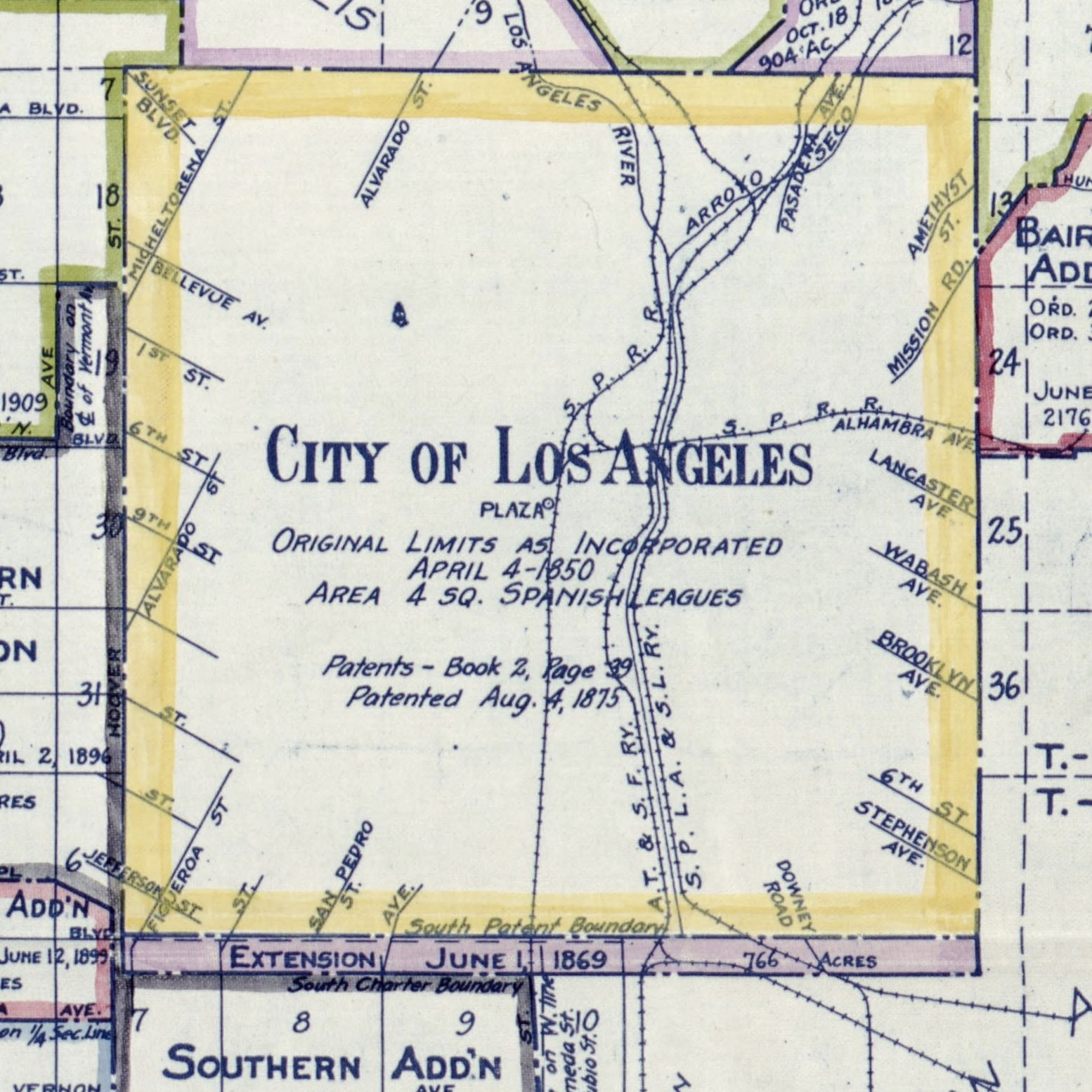
The boundaries of Los Angeles in 1850, at a time when the city was only four square Spanish leagues in area.

Los Angeles had several active "Vigilance Committees" during that era. Between 1850 and 1870, mobs carried out approximately 35 lynchings of Mexicans—more than four times the number that occurred in San Francisco. Los Angeles was described as "undoubtedly the toughest town of the entire nation." The homicide rate between 1847 and 1870 averaged 158 per 100,000 (13 murders per year), which was 10 to 20 times the annual murder rates for New York City during the same period.

The fear of Mexican violence and the racially motivated violence inflicted on them further marginalized the Mexicans, greatly reducing their economic and political opportunities.

John Gately Downey, the seventh governor of California was sworn into office on January 14, 1860, thereby becoming the first governor from Southern California. Governor Downey was born and raised in Castlesampson, County Roscommon, Ireland, and came to Los Angeles in 1850. He was responsible for keeping California in the Union during the Civil War.

=== Plight of the Indigenous ===
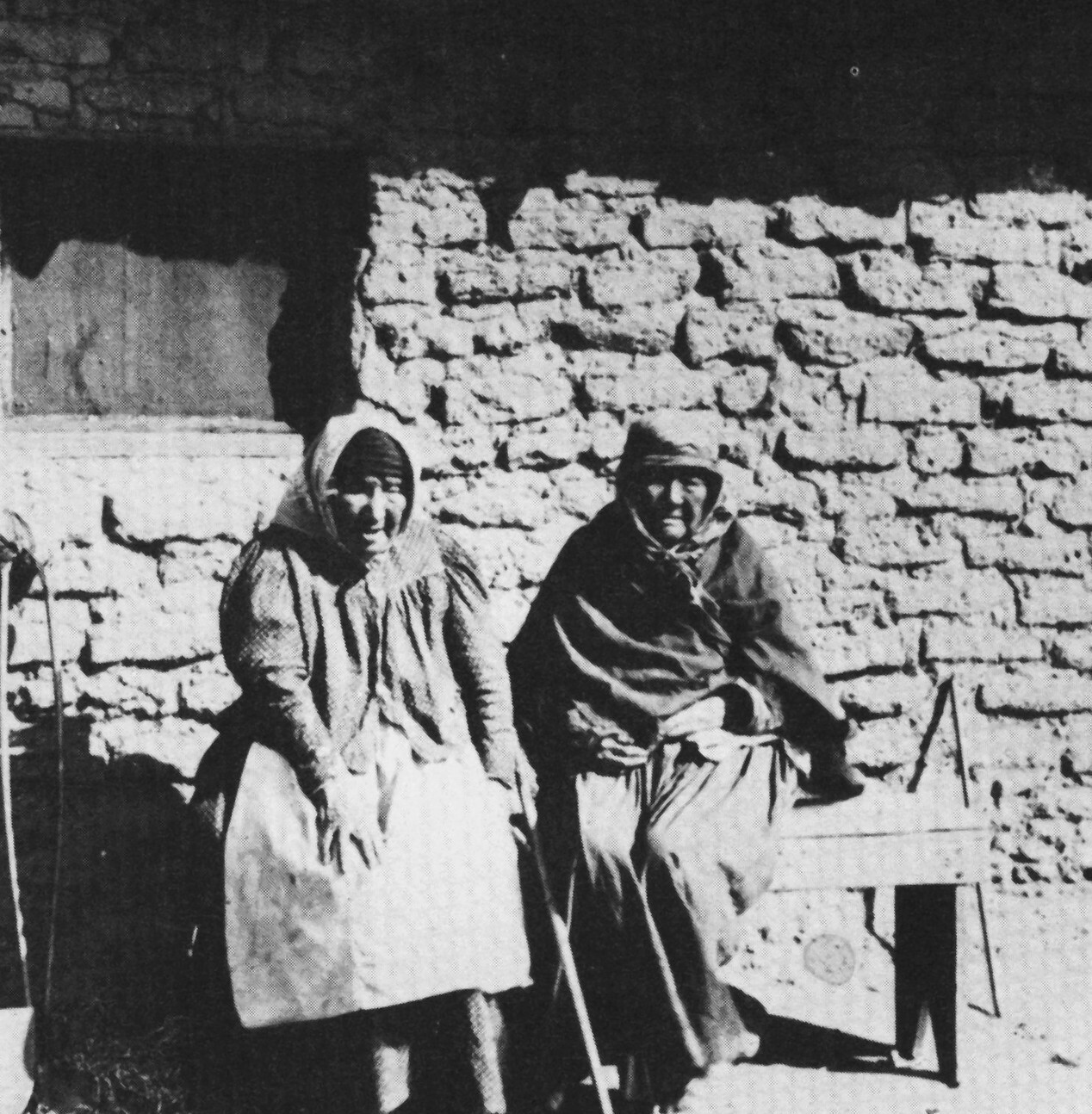
Tongva women in the San Fernando Valley, circa 1890.

Los Angeles was incorporated as a U.S. city on April 4, 1850. Five months later, California was admitted into the Union. Although the Treaty of Guadalupe Hidalgo required the U.S. to grant citizenship to the Native Americans of former Mexican territories, it did not happen for another 80 years. The Constitution of California deprived Indians of any protection under the law, considering them as non-persons. As a result, it was impossible to bring a White to trial for killing an Indigenous or forcing Indigenous off their properties. Whites concluded that the "quickest and best way to get rid of (their) troublesome presence was to kill them off, (and) this procedure was adopted as a standard for many years."

With the coming of the U.S. citizens, disease took a great toll among the Native Americans. Self-employed Natives were not allowed to sleep over in the city. They faced increasing competition for jobs as more Mexicans moved into the area and took over the labor force. Those who loitered or were drunk or unemployed were arrested and auctioned off as laborers to those who paid their fines. They were often paid for work with liquor, which only increased their problems.

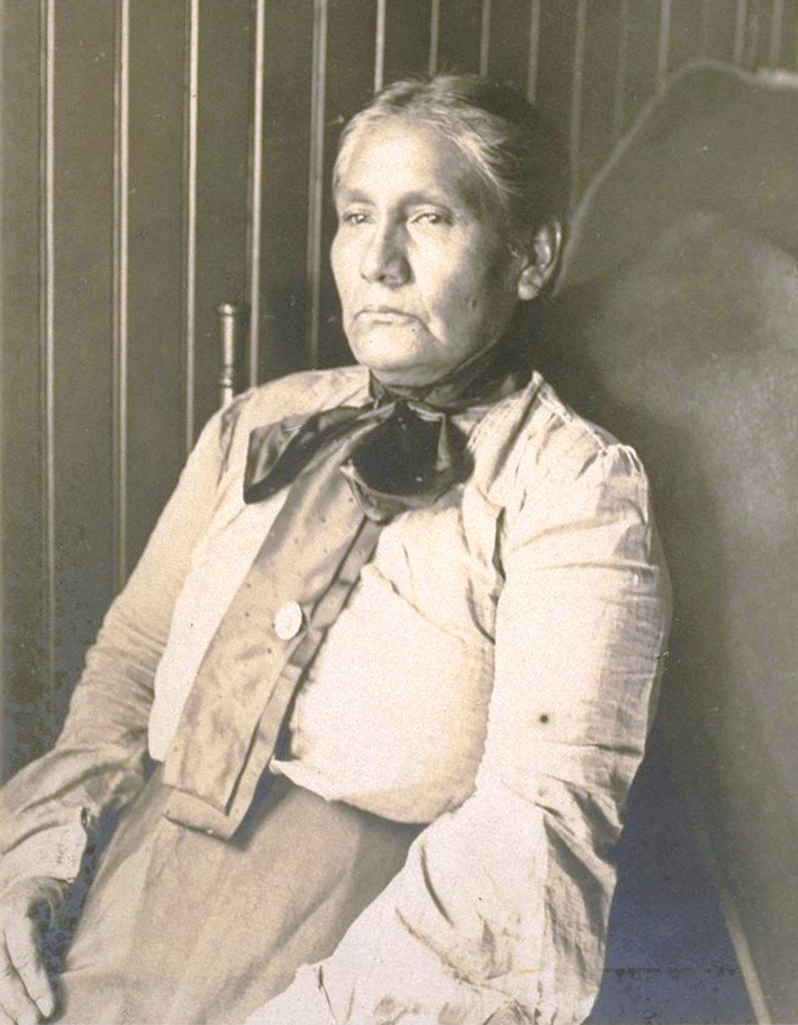
Narcisa Higuera, one of the last fluent speakers of the Tongva language, played a crucial role in its preservation.

When New England author and Indian-rights activist Helen Hunt Jackson toured the Indian villages of Southern California in 1883, she was appalled by the racism of the Anglos living there. She wrote that they treated Indians worse than animals, hunted them for sport, robbed them of their farmlands, and brought them to the edge of extermination. While Indians were depicted by Whites as lazy and shiftless, she found most of them to be hard-working craftsmen and farmers. Jackson's tour inspired her to write her 1884 novel Ramona, which she hoped would give a human face to the atrocities and indignities suffered by the Indians in California, and it did. The novel was enormously successful, inspiring four movies and a yearly pageant in Hemet, California. Many of the Indian villages of Southern California survived because of her efforts, including Morongo, Cahuilla, Soboba, Temecula, Pechanga, and Warner Springs.

Remarkably, the Tongva also survived. In 2006, the Los Angeles Times reported that there were 2,000 of them still living in Southern California. Some were organizing to protect burial and cultural sites. Others were trying to obtain federal recognition as a tribe.

=== Industrial expansion and growth ===
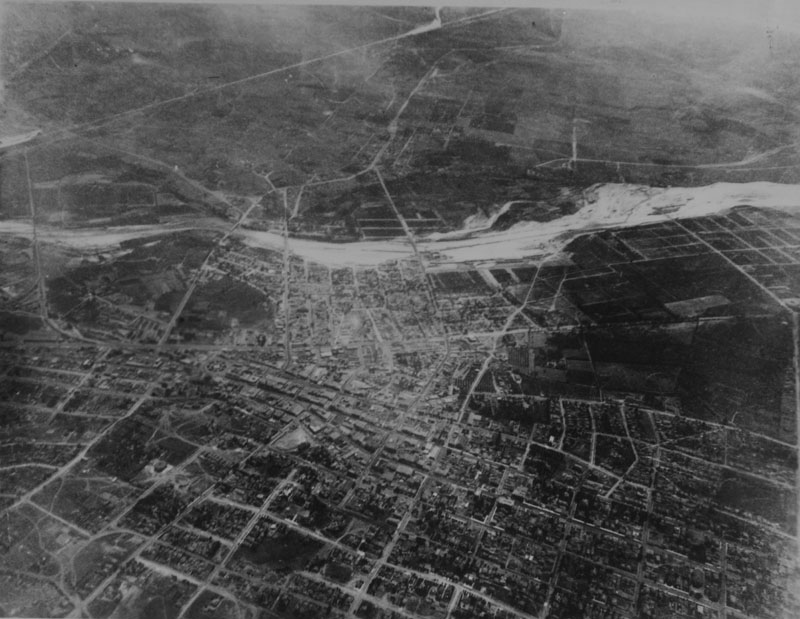
1887 aerial view of Los Angeles

In the 1870s, Los Angeles was still little more than a village of 5,000. By 1900, there were over 100,000 occupants of the city. Several men actively promoted Los Angeles, working to develop it into a great city and to make themselves wealthy. Angelenos set out to remake their geography to challenge San Francisco with its port facilities, railway terminal, banks and factories. The Farmers and Merchants Bank of Los Angeles was the first incorporated bank in Los Angeles, founded in 1871 by John G. Downey and Isaias W. Hellman. Wealthy Easterners who came as tourists recognized the growth opportunities and invested heavily in the region. During the 1880s and 1890s, the central business district (CBD) grew along Main and Spring streets towards Second Street and beyond. In Downtown Los Angeles, there was an archaeological excavation in 1996 on the site of Union Station which took place during the demolition of the parking structure as well as a massive excavation of the basement. Artifact deposits were typically trash pits and privies from the brothels and boarding houses that formerly existed in that area. In addition, there was also a sheet refuse of artifacts from Old Chinatown, the nearby residential area. This area of Downtown Los Angeles was known as the crib District which was heavily occupied by brothels and saloons.

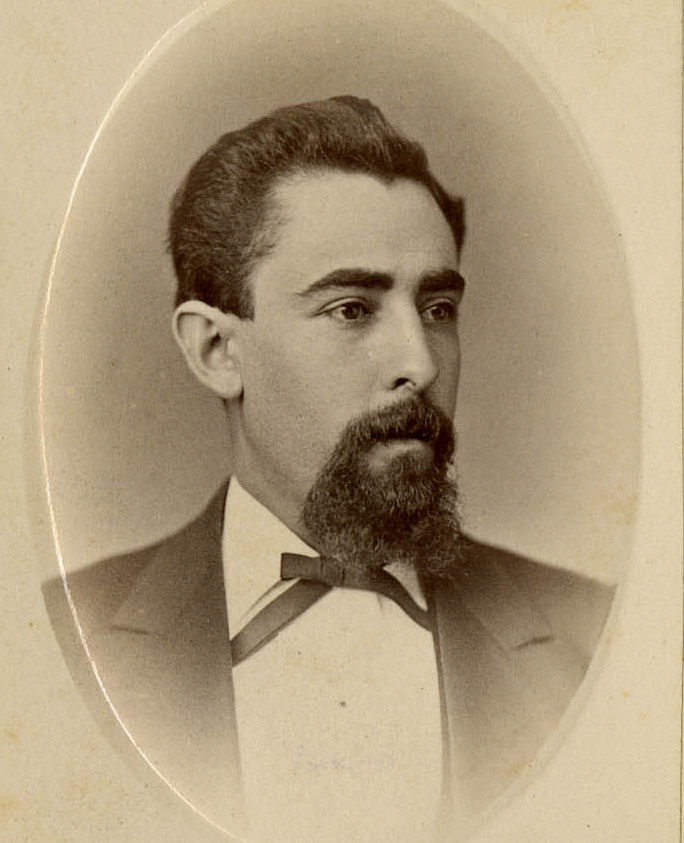
Reginaldo Francisco del Valle was instrumental in the creation of the Los Angeles State Normal School in 1882, which became the University of California, Los Angeles (UCLA).

By the 1880s, families began moving out of Aliso Street near Chinatown to more upscale neighborhoods which transformed residences into boarding houses or parlor houses otherwise known as brothels occupied by prostitutes. A 1996 archaeological excavation at Union Station in Downtown Los Angeles uncovered a red light district that closed down in 1909 as well as a residential neighborhood and commercial area. Disease was very present in parlor houses at this time. The most commonly found artifacts at the brothel were foodways like fancy cups and dishes as well as beaded lampshades and globe lamps. These could have been staged to create ambiance. Archaeologists have a hard time distinguishing if items such as liquor bottles, stemmed glasses, tumblers, cosmetics, drugs and medication were personal or work related. Most likely artifacts that were liquor related were most likely used for work since it constituted for 66% of artifacts at the brothel while at residences, bottles and glassware was at just 30%. Pharmaceutical and medical items were more often used in the brothels than in saloons, part of the artifacts analyzed by Catherine Holder Spude shows common medical remedies used in brothels for pain relief, like Lydia Pinkham's vegetable compound, with a 20.6% of alcohol, or Mrs. Winslow's soothing syrup, containing morphia. Catherine Holder Spude's archeological data collection explains the archeological typology of the often segregation of gender tasks in saloons and brothels. Based on artifacts and tools often used for the labor field inside the business, female attire, hairpins, jewelry, cosmetic containers, and others, were often found in the rooms that were leased for the use of brothels. There were also tools found in the saloons including pocketknives, collar stays, razors, suspender buckles, and buttons, emphasizing the role of males inside the saloons. Similarly, historical records and other kinds of written evidence show the transition and elimination of independent madam brothels for the expansion of men owning and operating in the local red-light district, an example, is the case of Tom Savage, son of Irish immigrants, who moved from San Francisco to Los Angeles in 1887 and worked his way up in the red-light district industry. Tom Savage's business strategies show the integration of saloon and brothel businesses by implementing leasing houses near the bar, stating a clear and direct relation between prostitution and alcohol consumption.

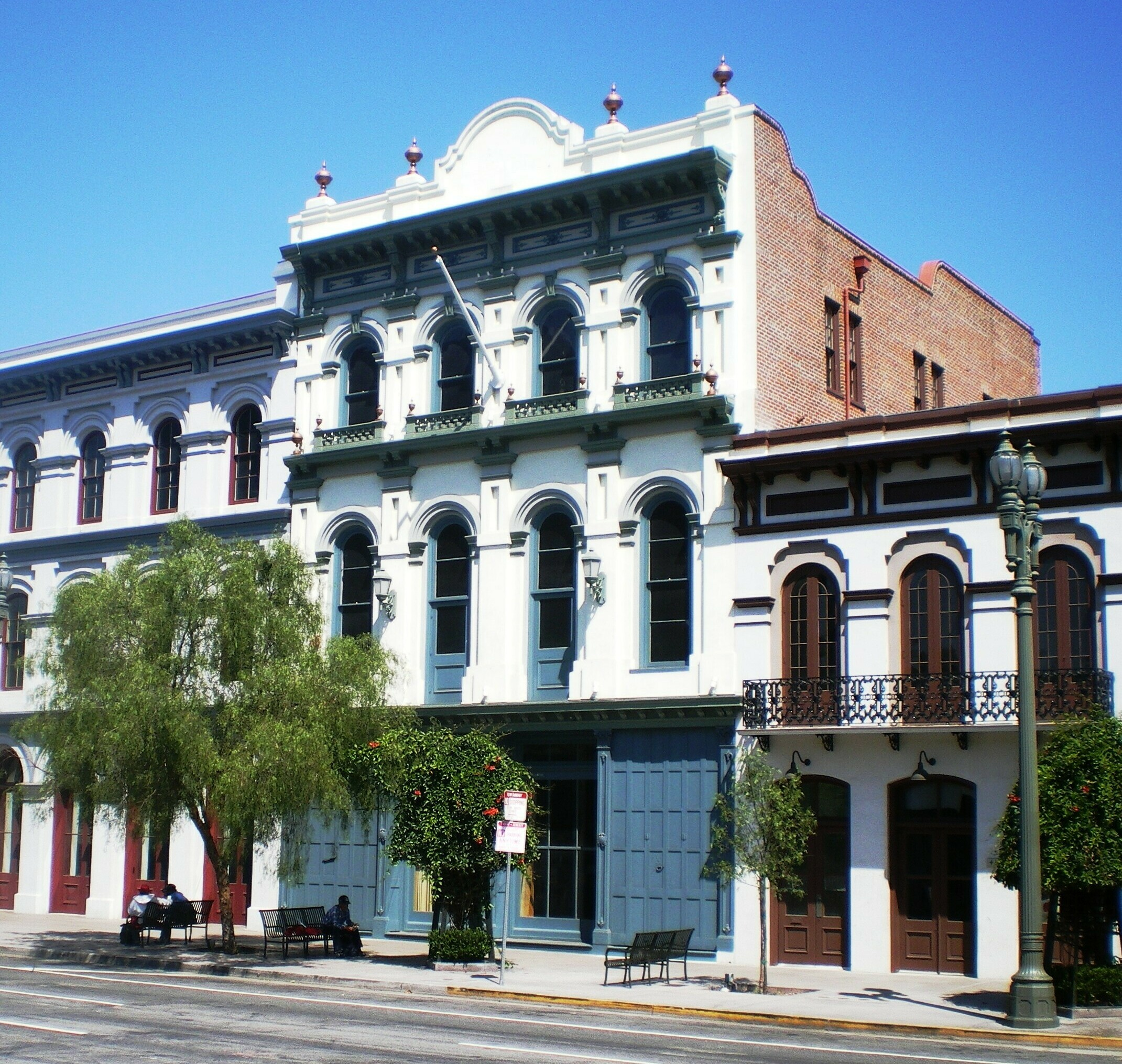
Merced Theatre was founded in 1870, as the first theater in the city.

Los Angeles grew into a major tourist spot in the late 1800s with the establishment of new transportation networks, and hotels. This includes the Mount Lowe Resort and Railway which was a popular location at the time for both its location in Los Angeles and many attractions. With the Industrial growth in Los Angeles in the late 1800s there was also an increase in cheap labor to help with tourism. Cheap labor was fulfilled by many immigrants and minority workers who faced struggles with low wages, poor living conditions, and even discrimination.

Due to the archaeological work done on the site from 2004 to 2005 excavations of the site found material remains that help to reconstruct the daily lives of the workers. These excavations were done in the workers quarters where they found ceramics, glassware, and food remains. These food remains reveal their dietary habits as well as consumption habits. The material remains give light to realities of laborers who have been overlooked in the historical record.

Much of Los Angeles County was farmland, with an emphasis on cattle, dairy products, vegetables and citrus fruits. After 1945, most of the farmland was converted into housing tracts.

=== Early transportation and railroads ===
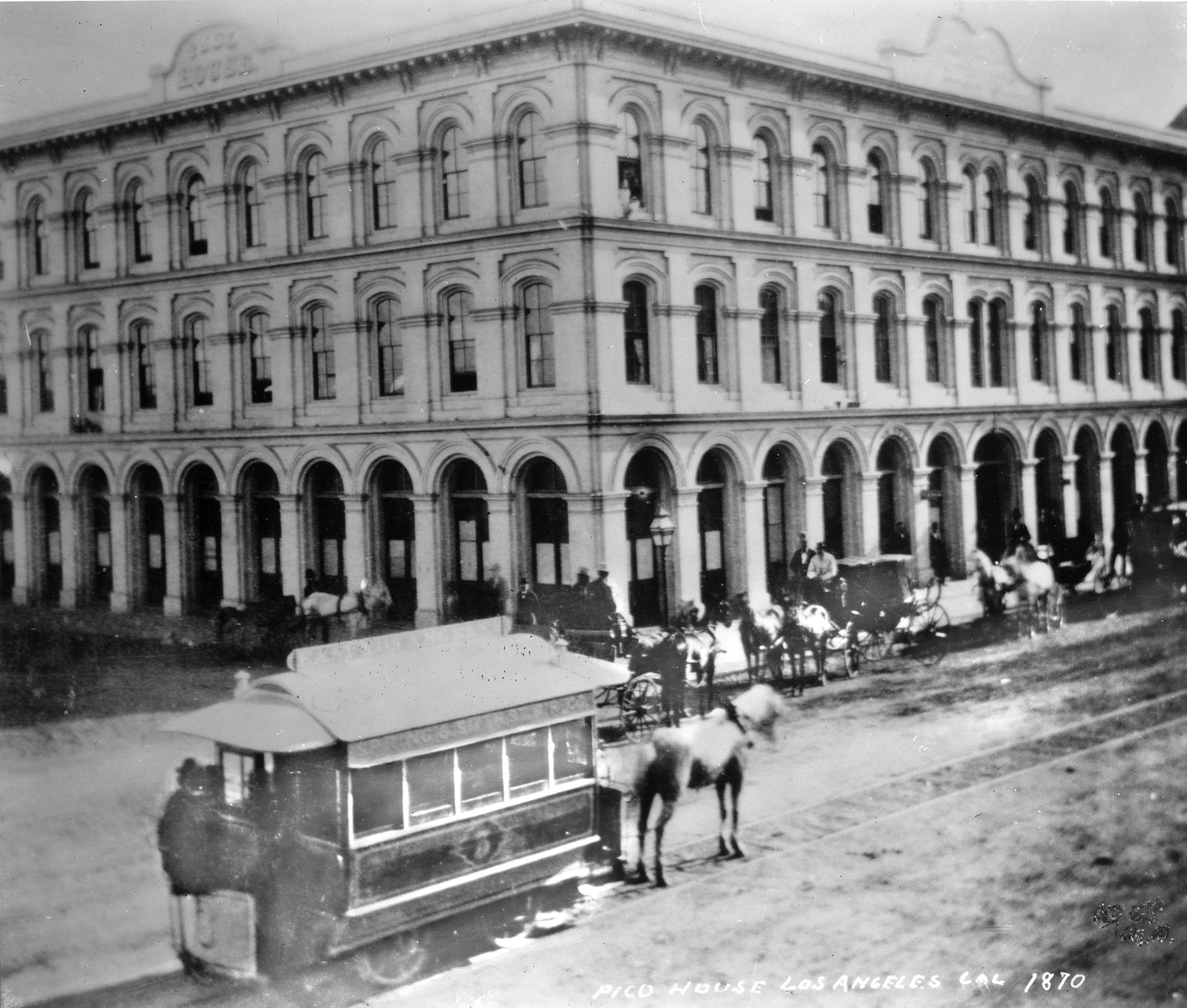
Streetcars in Los Angeles began to be utilized in 1874, initially as horse-drawn trams.

The city's first railroad, the Los Angeles & San Pedro Railroad, was inaugurated in October 1869 by John G. Downey and Phineas Banning. It ran 21 miles (34 km) between San Pedro and Los Angeles.

The town continued to grow at a moderate pace. Railroads finally arrived to connect with the Central Pacific and San Francisco in 1876. The impact was small. Much greater was the impact of the Santa Fe system (through its subsidiary California Southern Railroad) in 1885. The Santa Fe and Southern Pacific lines provided direct connections to the East, competed vigorously for business with much lower rates, and stimulated economic growth, bringing in tens of thousands of new residents, primarily from the Midwest. Tourists poured in by the thousands every week, and many planned on returning or resettling.

The city still lacked a modern harbor. Phineas Banning excavated a channel out of the mud flats of San Pedro Bay leading to Wilmington in 1871. Banning had already laid track and shipped in locomotives to connect the port to the city. Harrison Gray Otis, founder and owner of the Los Angeles Times, and a number of business colleagues embarked on reshaping southern California by expanding that into a harbor at San Pedro using federal dollars.

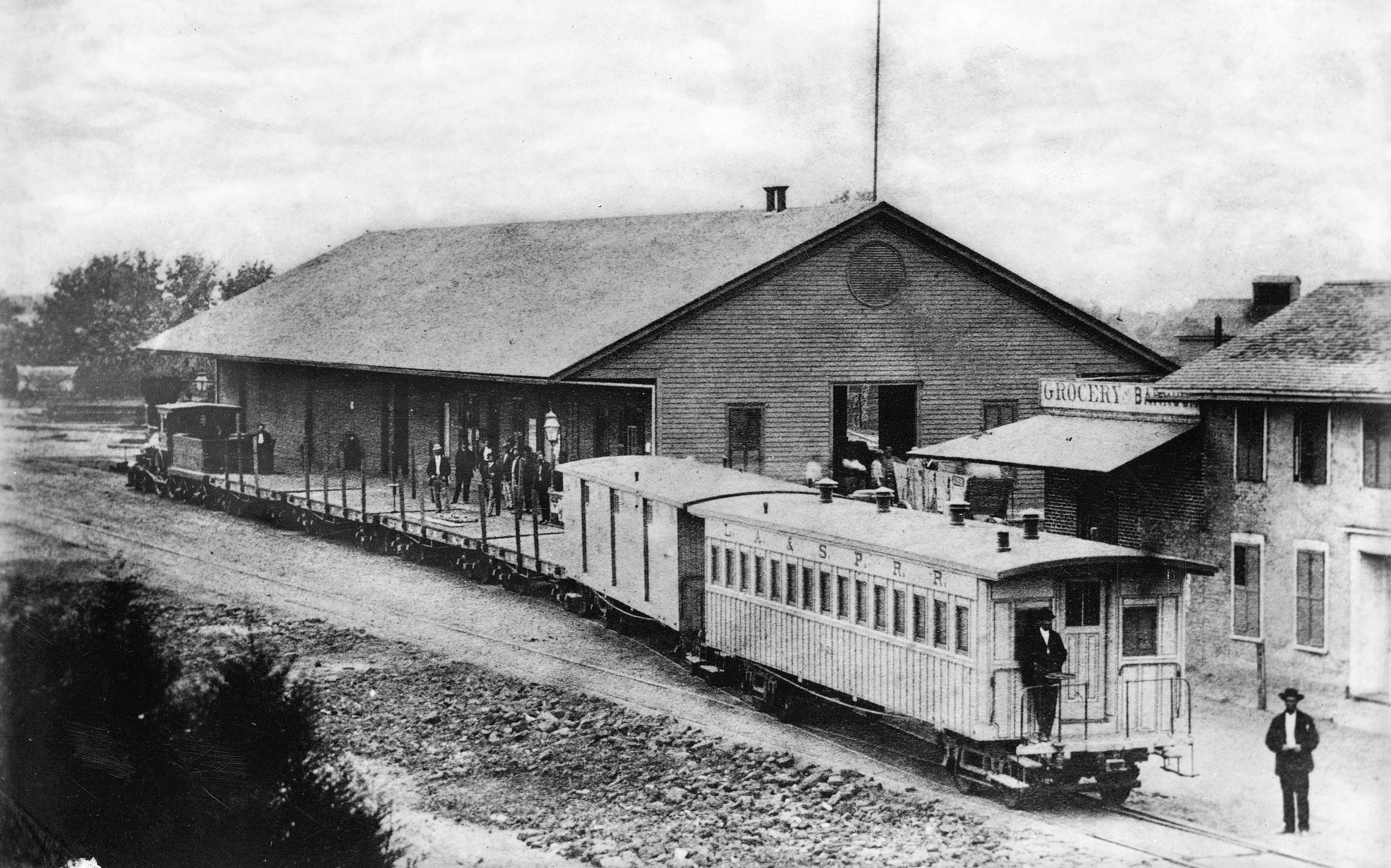
The Los Angeles & San Pedro Railroad was the first railroad in Los Angeles, photo ca.1880.

This put them in conflict with Collis P. Huntington, president of the Southern Pacific Company and one of California's "Big Four" investors in the Central Pacific and Southern Pacific. (The "Big Four" are sometimes numbered among the "robber barons" of the Gilded Age). Southern Pacific had initially supported the San Pedro port, and when in 1875 a potential rival emerged in a Santa Monica wharf connected to downtown by the Los Angeles and Independence Railroad, Southern Pacific bought the railroad and demolished the wharf. However, by the 1890s Southern Pacific favored a location for the Port of Los Angeles in Santa Monica because of their control of the land there, and opened the Long Wharf in 1894. The Wharf extended 4,600 feet into the ocean, and was the longest wharf in the world at the time. The Los Angeles Chamber of Commerce feared Southern Pacific controlling the port, and so attempted to favor the San Pedro location, sparking the Free Harbor Fight. Congress authorized the Army Corps of Engineers to choose the location, and in 1897 they chose San Pedro.

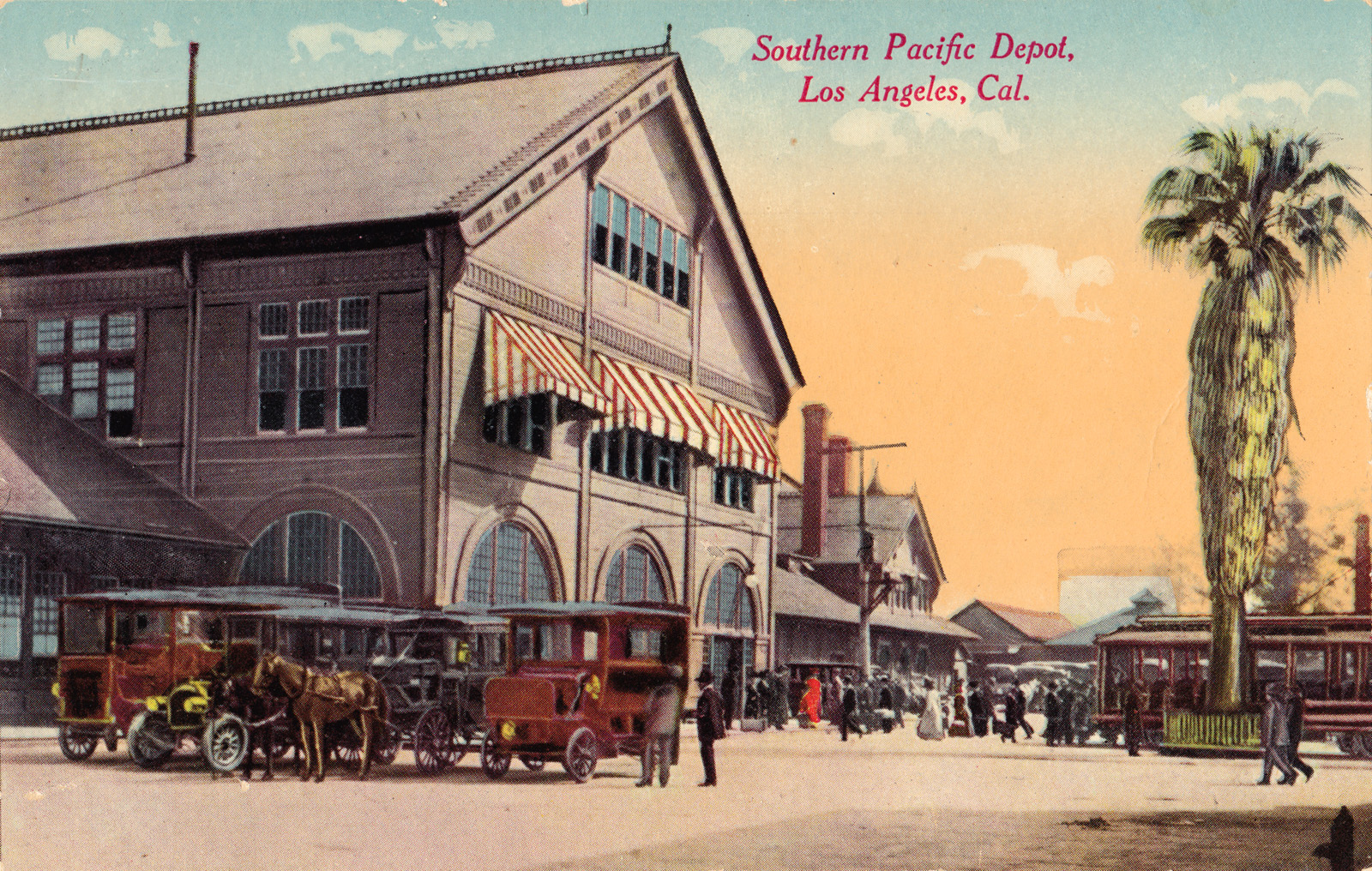
Arcade Depot was the main passenger station for the Southern Pacific Railroad, from 1888 until 1914.

During the late 1800s the construction of the Southern Pacific Railroad was conducted by Chinese workers. The Southern Pacific Railroad connected Los Angeles to San Francisco. It played an important role in the economic and industrial growth in both the state of California and the city of Los Angeles. An Archaeological excavation took place in which they found artifacts at campsites of the Chinese workers. The sites yielded items such as ceramics, tools, personal items, and fragments of everyday objects used by the workers. The excavation also found architectural features which included the remains of living quarters, bunkhouses, and cookhouses. These artifacts and architectural features provide a unique insight into the lives of the Chinese laborers.

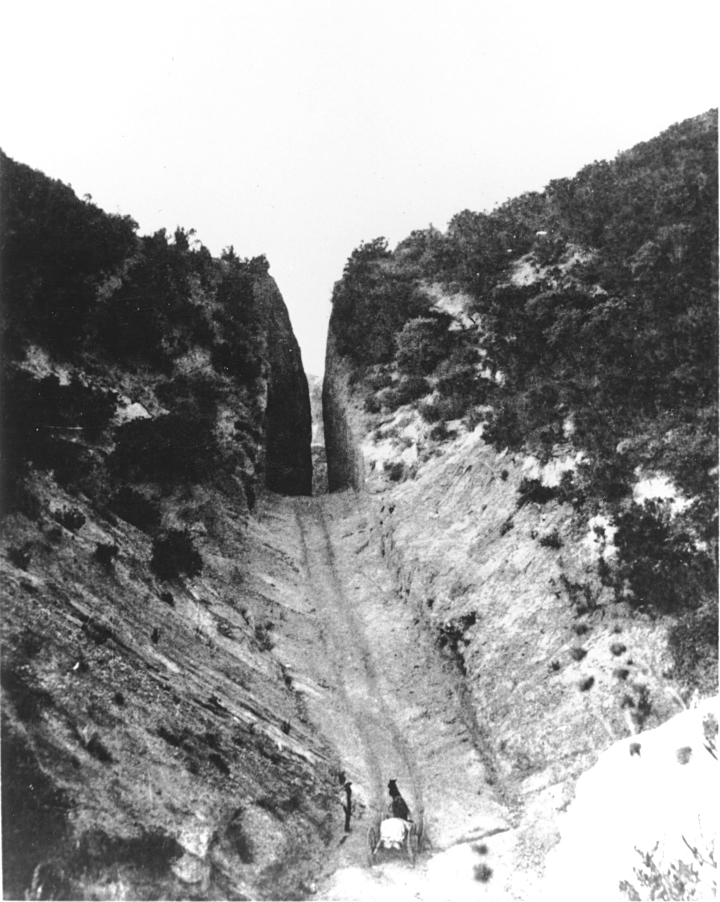
Beale's Cut, carved into San Fernando Pass in 1872.

In 1876 the Newhall railroad tunnel located 27 miles (43 km) north of Los Angeles between the town of San Fernando and Lyons Station Stagecoach Stop (now Newhall) was completed, providing the final link from San Francisco to Los Angeles for the railroad. The 6,940-foot-long railroad tunnel (2,115.3 m) took a year and a half to complete. More than 1,500 mostly Chinese laborers took part in the tunnel construction, which began at the south end of the mountain on March 22, 1875. Many of them had prior experience working on Southern Pacific's located tunnels in the Tehachapi Pass. Due to the sandstone composition of the mountain that was saturated with water and oil, frequent cave-ins occurred and the bore had to be constantly shored up by timbers during excavation. The initial location for the north end of the tunnel near Newhall was abandoned due to this. The north end of the tunnel excavation commenced in June 1875. Water was a constant problem during construction and pumps were utilized to keep the tunnel from flooding. Workers digging from both the north and south ends of the tunnel came face to face on July 14, 1876. The bores from each end were only a half inch out of line with dimensions of 22 feet (6.7 m) high, 16.5 feet (5.0 m) wide at the bottom and over 18 feet (5.5 m) at the shoulders. Track was laid in place soon after the tunnel dig was completed and the first train passed through on August 12, 1876. On September 4, Charles Crocker notified Southern Pacific that the track had been completed on the route between San Francisco and Los Angeles.

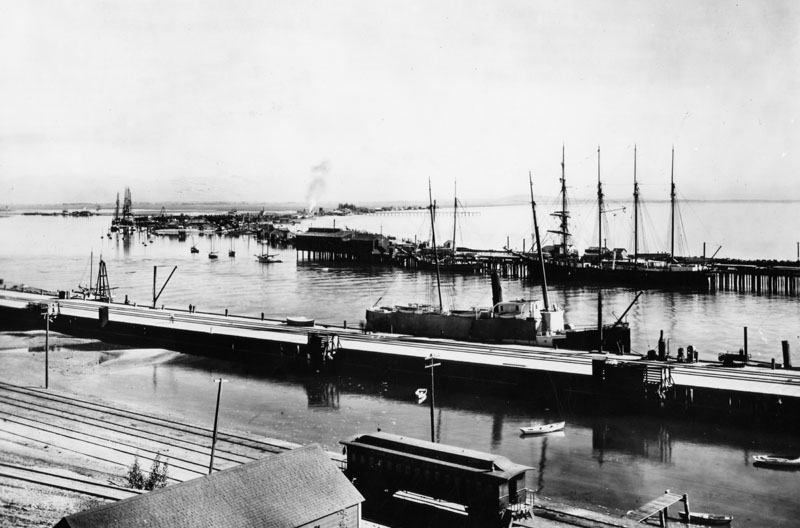
San Pedro harbor in 1899.

The San Pedro forces eventually prevailed (though it required Banning and Downey to turn their railroad over to the Southern Pacific). Work on the San Pedro breakwater began in 1899 and was finished in 1910. Otis Chandler and his allies secured a change in state law in 1909 that allowed Los Angeles to absorb San Pedro and Wilmington, using a long, narrow corridor of land to connect them with the rest of the city. The debacle of the future Los Angeles harbor was termed the Free Harbor Fight.

Streetcar service in Los Angeles began with horsecars (1874–1897), cable cars (1885–1902) and electric streetcars starting in 1887–1963. In 1898, Henry Huntington and a San Francisco syndicate led by Isaias W. Hellman purchased five trolley lines, consolidated them into the Los Angeles Railway (the 'yellow cars') and two years later founded the Pacific Electric Railway (the 'red cars'). Los Angeles Railway served the city and the Pacific Electric Railway served the rest of the county. At its peak, Pacific Electric was the largest electrically operated interurban railway in the world. Over 1,000 miles (1,600 km) of tracks connected Los Angeles with Hollywood, Pasadena, San Pedro, Long Beach, Venice Beach, Santa Monica, even as far as Riverside, San Bernardino, Santa Ana, and Newport Beach. The Guardian concluded that at their peak, the Pacific Electric and Los Angeles Railway (itself with 642 miles of track) "made the region's public transportation the best in the country, if not the world".

=== Old Chinatown ===
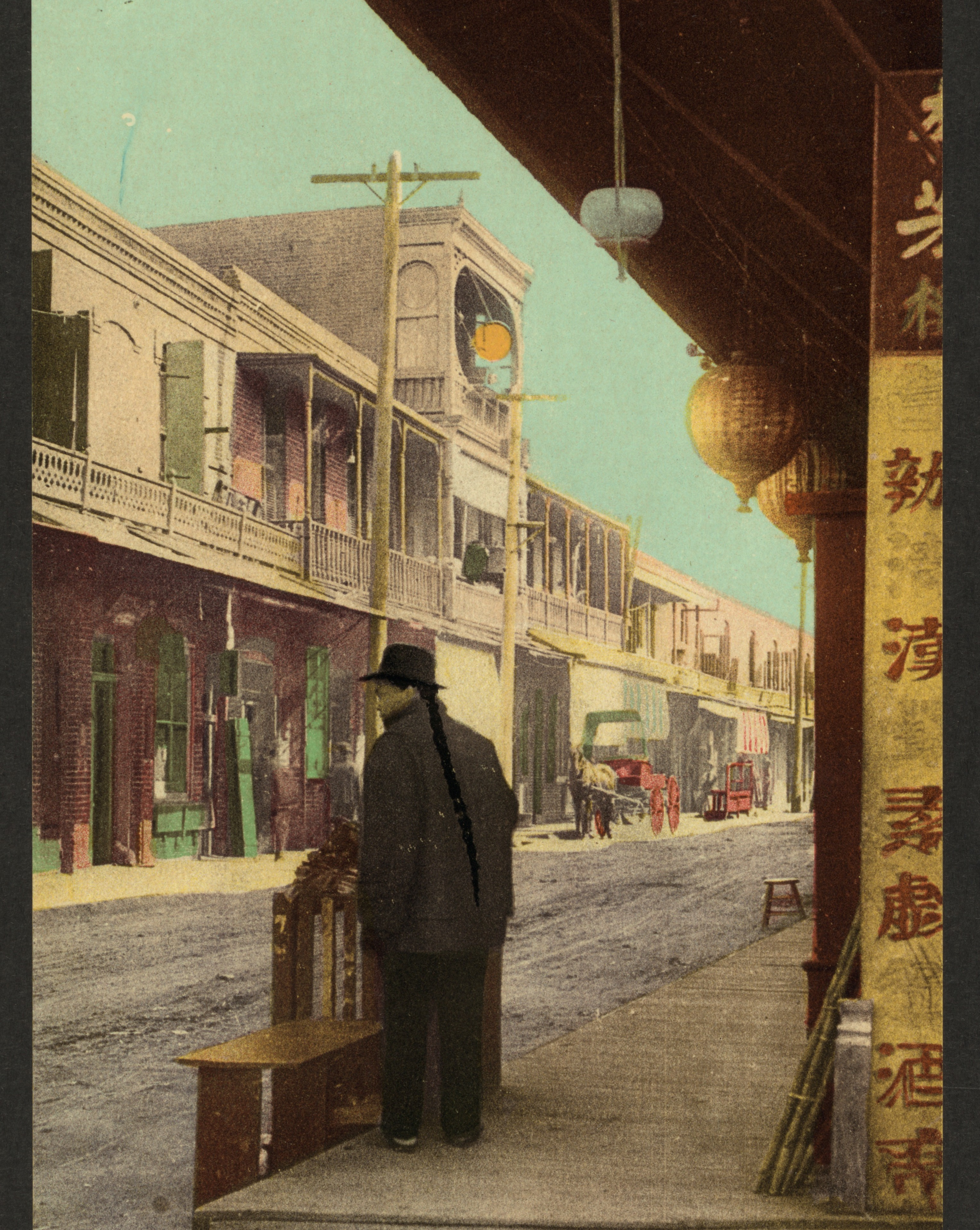
Old Chinatown existed from the 1860s until the 1930s.

First built in the 1860s, Old Chinatown in Los Angeles was once located on the site of what now is Union Station. Old Chinatown was centered on Alameda Street which was also where the former Red Light district of Los Angeles was. In 1984, an archaeological excavation of El Pueblo de Los Angeles Historical Monument led by John Romani uncovered several artifacts of Chinese, Euro- American, and Native American origin. There were historic features that were also found which dated to early Euro-American and Chinese American establishments. One of these establishments Romani and his team uncovered a brick structure that was built in the 1880s with the alignment of the street possibly being dated to the Spanish period. This area is now known as Ferguson Alley in Old Chinatown. At this site, there was a 90 cm deep artifact rich deposit containing Chinese ceramics, Asian coins, opium pipe fragments, and game pieces were found as well as Native American pottery, ground stone, and antler flakers. Apart from this, data collection on census reports from 1870 and 1930 shows the growth of the Chinese American population in Los Angeles, going from 234 to 3,009 population; more than 2,000 people in a range of 60 years. In Old Chinatown, prostitution was a way of life for Chinese women. In 1870, historical records show that only about 20% of the Asian population in Los Angeles was women. In Chinatown, there were only 34 females with 22 of them being at the oldest, 20 years old. Most of these women worked as prostitutes in Old Chinatown which was located on Alameda Street, the site of Los Angeles' former Red Light District. In a lot of cases, these women immigrated from China for the purpose of prostitution with their poor and desperate families selling them into an indentured servitude.

Although there had been some anti-Chinese behavior in the preceding decades, editorial attacks in the local press beginning just before 1870 was followed by increased attacks. The Los Angeles Chinese massacre of 1871, a racial massacre targeting Chinese immigrants occurred on October 24, 1871, when approximately 500 white and Hispanic Americans attacked, harassed, robbed, and murdered the ethnic Chinese residents. The mob gathered after hearing that a policeman and a rancher had been killed as a result of a conflict between rival tongs. Nineteen Chinese immigrants were killed, fifteen of whom were later hanged by the mob in the course of the riot. Those killed represented over 10% of the small Chinese population of Los Angeles at the time, which numbered 172 prior to the massacre.

=== Oil discovery ===
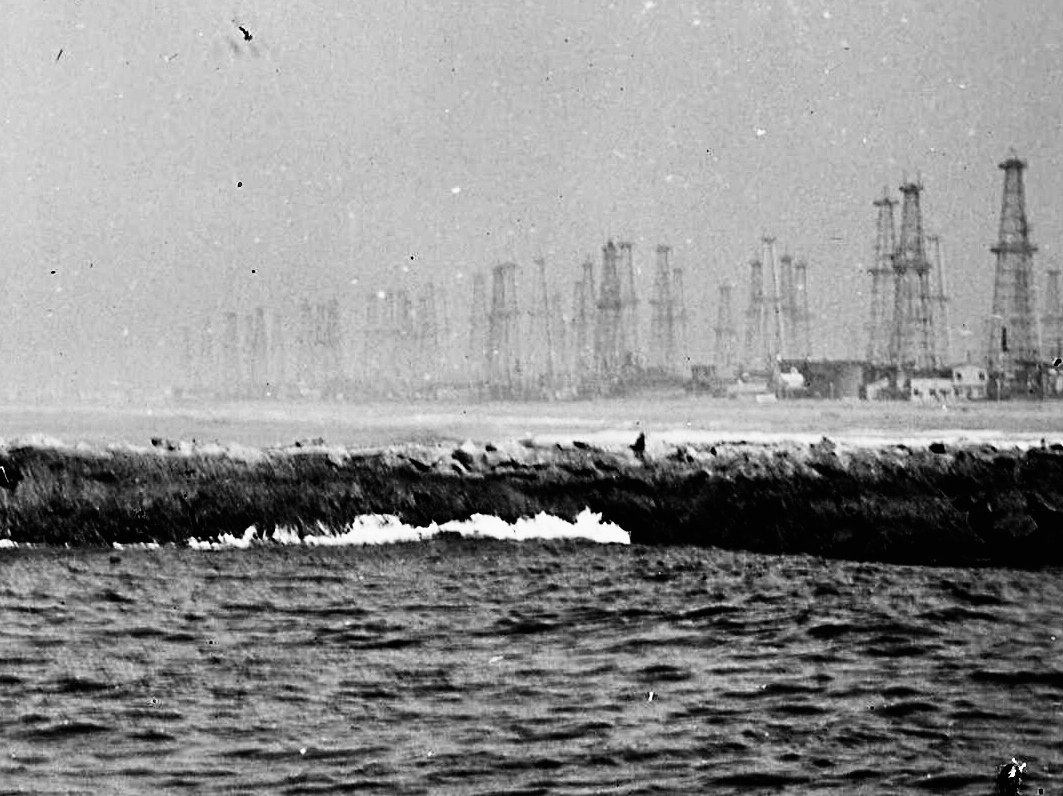
Oil wells along Venice Beach.

Oil was discovered by Edward L. Doheny in 1892, near the present location of Dodger Stadium. The Los Angeles City Oil Field was the first of many fields in the basin to be exploited, and in 1900 and 1902, respectively, the Beverly Hills Oil Field and Salt Lake Oil Field were discovered a few miles west of the original find. Los Angeles became a center of oil production in the early 20th century, and by 1923, the region was producing one-quarter of the world's total supply; it is still a significant producer, with the Wilmington Oil Field having the fourth-largest reserves of any field in California.

=== Early labor movements ===
At the same time that the Los Angeles Times was spurring enthusiasm for the expansion of Los Angeles, the newspaper was also trying to turn it into a union-free or open shop town. Fruit growers and local merchants who had opposed the Pullman strike in 1894 subsequently formed the Merchants and Manufacturers Association (M & M) to support the Times's anti-union campaign.

View of Spring Street in 1900.

The California labor movement, with its strength concentrated in San Francisco, largely had ignored Los Angeles for years. However, in 1907, the American Federation of Labor decided to challenge the open shop. In 1909, the city fathers placed a ban on free speech from public streets and private property except for the Plaza. Locals had claimed that it had been an Open Forum forever. The area was of particular concern to Harrison Grey Otis and his son-in-law Harry Chandler. This conflict came to a head with the bombing of the Times in 1910. Two months later, the Llewellyn Iron Works near the plaza was bombed. A meeting hastily was called of the Chamber of Commerce and Manufacturers Association. The L.A. Times wrote: "radical and practical matters (were) considered, and steps taken for the adaption of such as are adequate to cope with a situation tardily recognized as the gravest that Los Angeles has ever been called upon to face."

The authorities indicted John F. and James B. McNamara, both associated with the Iron Workers Union, for the bombing; Clarence Darrow, famed Chicago defense lawyer, represented them. At the same time the McNamara brothers were awaiting trial, Los Angeles was preparing for a city election. Job Harriman, running on the socialist ticket, was challenging the establishment's candidate. Harriman's campaign, however, was tied to the asserted innocence of the McNamaras. But the defense was in trouble: The prosecution not only had evidence of the McNamaras' complicity, but had trapped Darrow in a clumsy attempt to bribe one of the jurors. On December 1, 1911, four days before the final election, the McNamaras entered a plea of guilty in return for prison terms. Harriman lost badly.

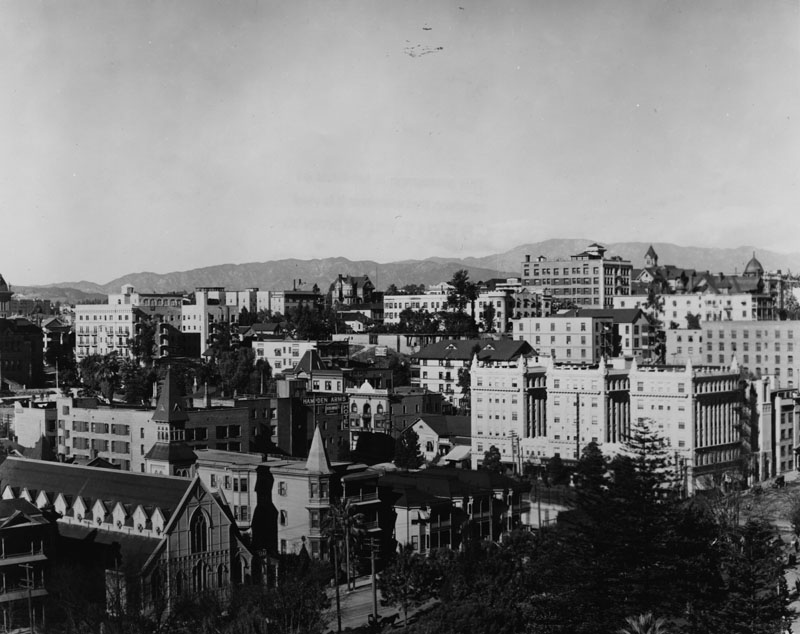
Bunker Hill in 1900, viewed from modern-day Pershing Square.

On Christmas Day, 1913, police attempted to break up an IWW rally of 500 taking place in the Plaza. Encountering resistance, the police waded into the crowd attacking them with their clubs. One citizen was killed. In the aftermath, the authorities attempted to impose martial law in the wake of growing protests. Seventy-three people were arrested in connection with the riots. The city council introduced new measures to control public speaking. The Times called onlookers and taco vendors "cultural subversives."

The open shop campaign continued from strength to strength, although not without meeting opposition from workers. By 1923, the Industrial Workers of the World had made considerable progress in organizing the longshoremen in San Pedro and led approximately 3,000 men to walk off the job. With the support of the Los Angeles Times, a special LAPD Red Squad arrested so many strikers that the city's jails were soon filled.

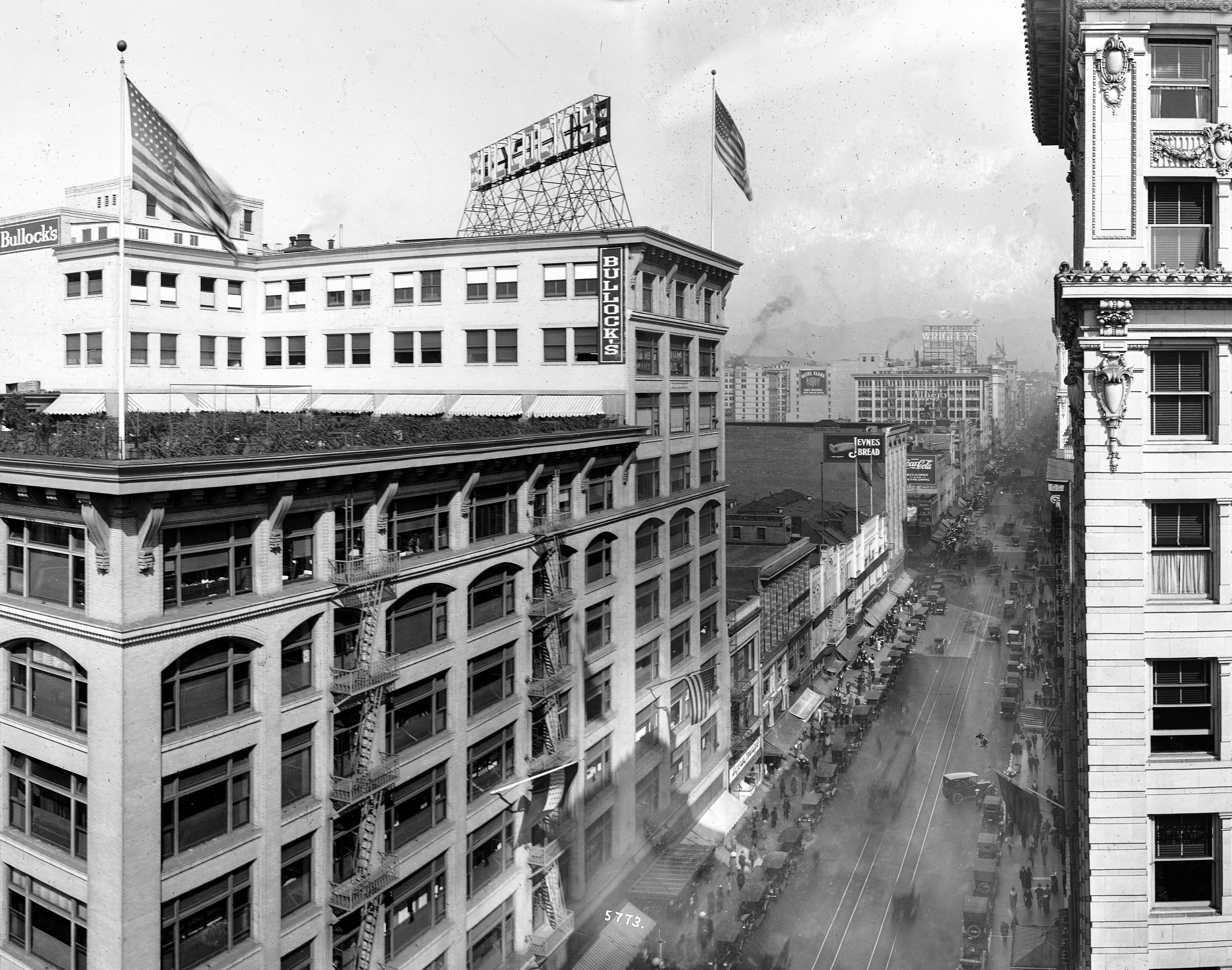
Broadway in the Historic Core 1917

Some 1,200 dock workers were corralled in a special stockade in Griffith Park. The Times wrote approvingly that "stockades and forced labor were a good remedy for IWW terrorism." Public meetings were outlawed in San Pedro, Upton Sinclair was arrested at Liberty Hill in San Pedro for reading the United States Bill of Rights on the private property of a strike supporter (the arresting officer told him "we'll have none of 'that Constitution stuff'") and blanket arrests were made at union gatherings. The strike ended after members of the Ku Klux Klan and the American Legion raided the IWW Hall and attacked the men, women and children meeting there. The strike was defeated.

Los Angeles developed another industry in the early 20th century when movie producers from the East Coast relocated there. These new employers were likewise afraid of unions and other social movements: During Upton Sinclair's campaign for governor of California under the banner of his "End Poverty In California" (EPIC) movement, Louis B. Mayer turned MGM's Culver City studio into the unofficial headquarters of the organized campaign against EPIC. MGM produced fake newsreel interviews with whiskered actors with Russian accents voicing their enthusiasm for EPIC, along with footage focusing on hobos huddled on the borders of California waiting to enter and live off the bounty of its taxpayers once Sinclair was elected. Sinclair, however, lost the election.

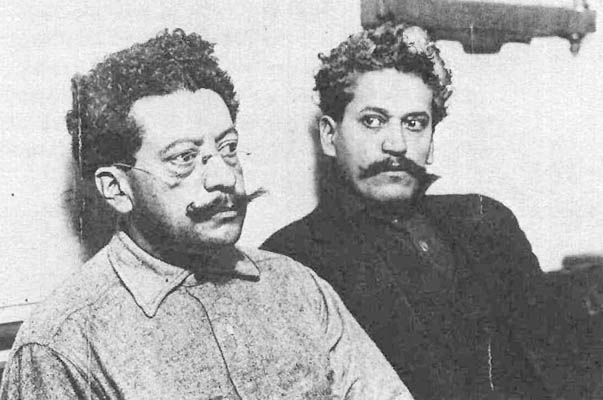
Brothers Ricardo Flores Magón and Enrique Flores Magón were arrested in Los Angeles in 1917 for promoting anti-war and Anti-American causes.

The immigrants arriving in the city to find jobs sometimes brought the revolutionary zeal and idealism of their homelands. These included anarchists such as Russian Emma Goldman and Ricardo Flores Magón and his brother Enrique of the Partido Liberal Mexicano. They later were joined by the socialist candidate for mayor Job Harriman, Chinese revolutionaries, the novelist Upton Sinclair, "Wobblies" (members of the Industrial Workers of the World, the IWW), and Socialist and Communist labor organizers such as the Japanese-American Karl Yoneda and the Russian-born New Yorker Meyer Baylin. The socialists were the first to set up a soapbox in the Plaza, which served as the location of union rallies and protests and riots as the police attempted to break up meetings.

Unions began to make progress in organizing these workers as the New Deal arrived in the 1930s. An influential strike was the Los Angeles Garment Workers Strike of 1933, one of the first strikes in which Mexican immigrant workers played a prominent role for union recognition. The unions made even greater gains in the war years, as Los Angeles grew further.

=== Flooding and water supply ===
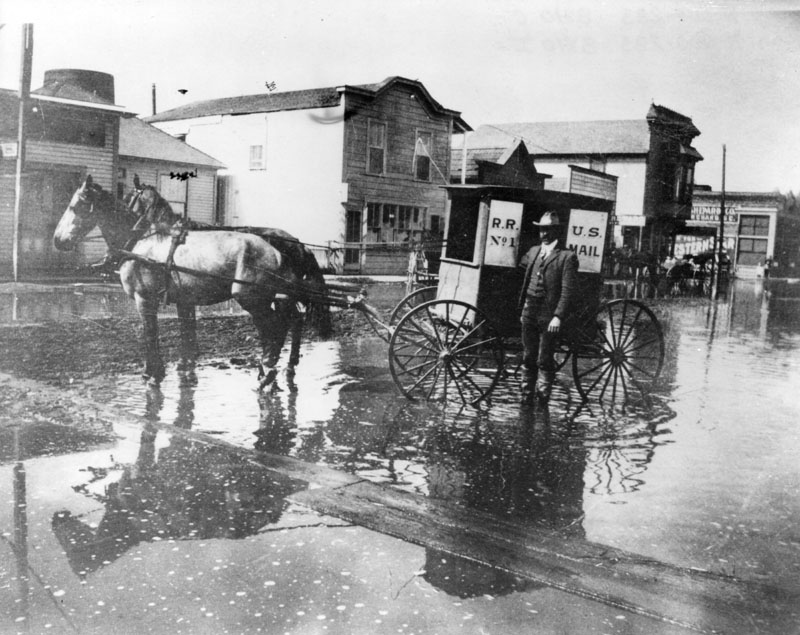
Los Angeles River flooding in 1903

The Los Angeles River flowed clear and fresh all year, supporting 45 Tongva villages in the area. The source of the river was the aquifer under the San Fernando Valley, supplied with water from the surrounding mountains. The rising of the underground bedrock at the Glendale Narrows (near today's Griffith Park) squeezed the water to the surface at that point. Then, through much of the year, the river emerged from the valley to flow across the floodplain 20 miles (32 km) to the sea. The area also provided other streams, lakes, and artesian wells.

Early settlers were more than a little discouraged by the region's diverse and unpredictable weather. They watched helplessly as long droughts weakened and starved their livestock, only to be drowned and carried off by ferocious storms. During the years of little rain, people built too close to the riverbed, only to see their homes and barns later swept to sea during a flood. The location of the Los Angeles Plaza had to be moved twice because of previously having been built too close to the riverbed. Worse, floods changed the river's course. When the settlers arrived, the river joined Ballona Creek to discharge in Santa Monica Bay. A fierce storm in 1835 diverted its course to Long Beach, where it stays today. Early citizens could not even maintain a footbridge over the river from one side of the city to the other. After the American takeover, the city council authorized spending of $20,000 for a contractor to build a substantial wooden bridge across the river. The first storm to come along dislodged the bridge, used it as a battering ram to break through the embankment, and scattered its timbers all the way to the sea.

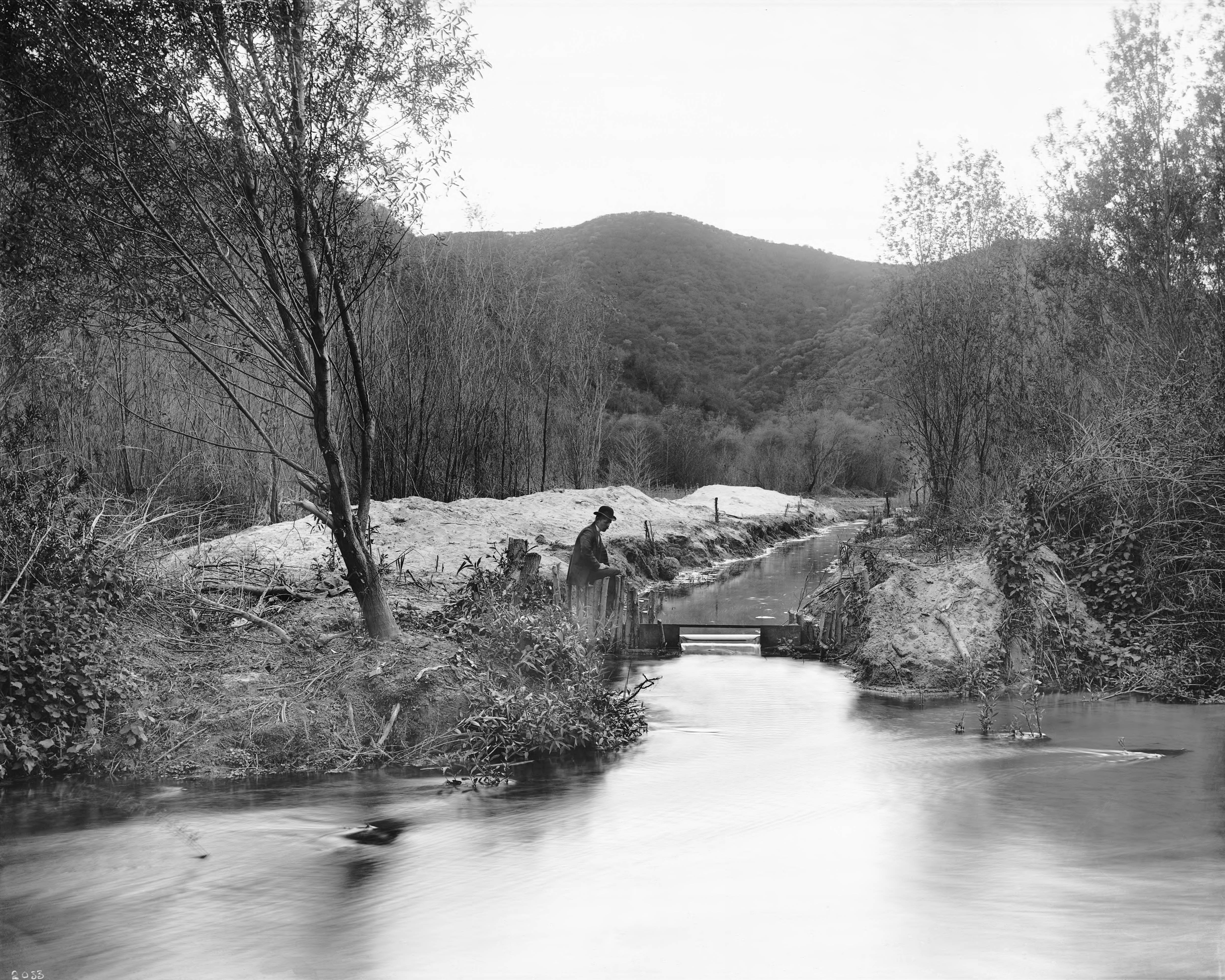
Los Angeles River at Griffith Park, c. 1898–1910

Some of the most concentrated rainfall in the history of the United States has occurred in the San Gabriel Mountains north of Los Angeles and Orange Counties. On April 5, 1926, a rain gauge in the San Gabriels collected one inch in one minute. In January 1969, more water fell on the San Gabriels in nine days than New York City sees in a year. In February 1978, almost a foot of rain fell in 24 hours, and, in one blast, an inch and a half in five minutes. This storm caused massive debris flows throughout the region, one of them unearthing the corpses in the Verdugo Hills Cemetery and depositing them in the town below. Another wiped out the small town of Hidden Springs in a tributary of the Big Tujunga Creek, killing 13 people.

The greatest daily rainfall recorded in California was 26.12 inches on January 23, 1943, at Hoegees near Mt. Wilson in the San Gabriel Mountains. Fifteen other stations reported over 20 inches in two days from the same storm. Forty-five others reported 70% of the average annual rainfall in two days.

Quibbling between city and county governments delayed any response to the flooding until a massive storm in 1938 flooded Los Angeles and Orange counties. The federal government stepped in. To transfer floodwater to the sea as quickly as possible, the Army Corps of Engineers paved the beds of the river and its tributaries. The corps also built several dams and catchment basins in the canyons along the San Gabriel Mountains to reduce the debris flows. It was an enormous project, taking years to complete.

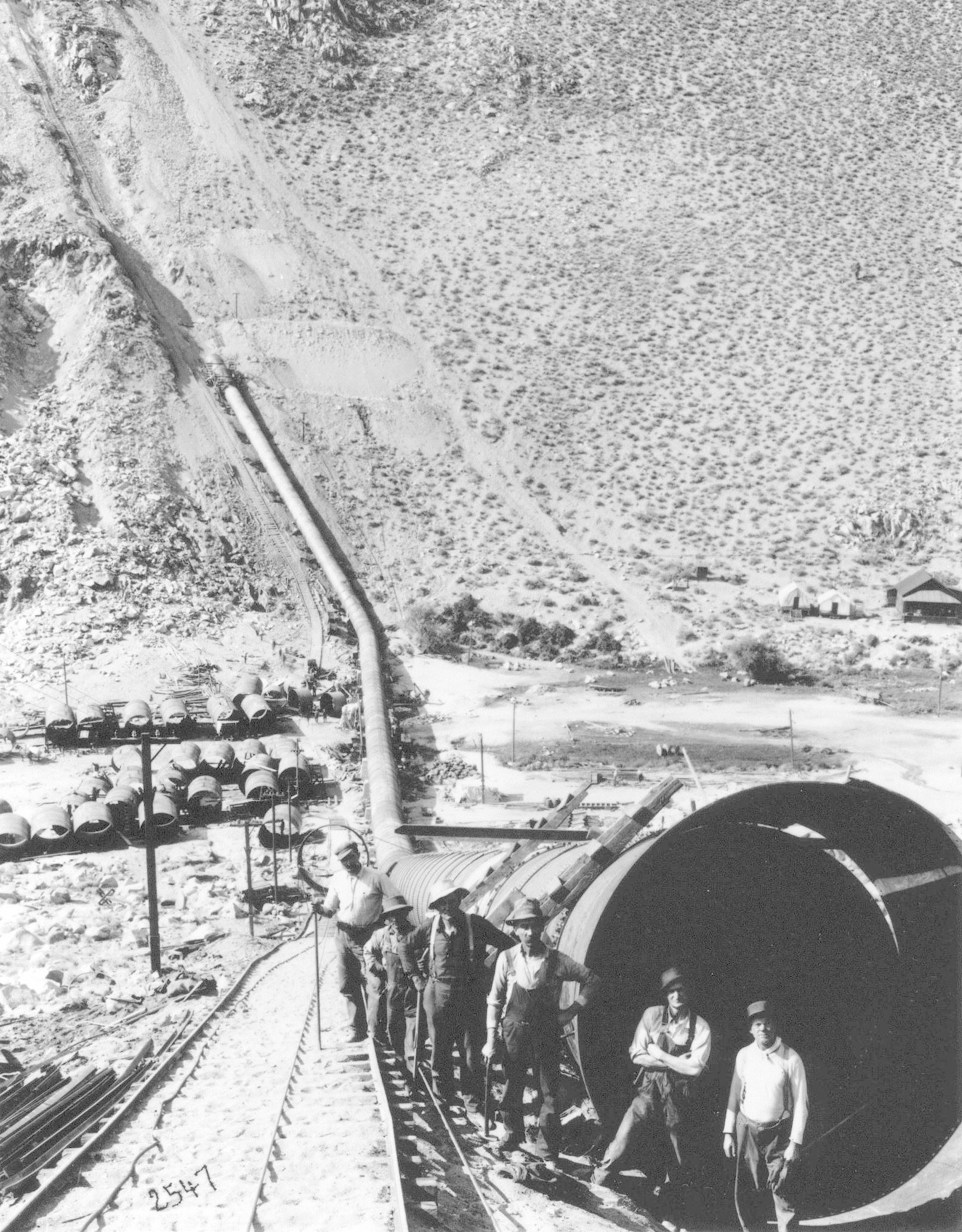
Workers assembling pipes for the Los Angeles Aqueduct in 1912, built during the California Water Wars.

Today, the Los Angeles River functions mainly as a flood control. A drop of rain falling in the San Gabriel Mountains will reach the sea faster than an auto can drive. During today's rainstorms, the volume of the Los Angeles River at Long Beach can be as large as the Mississippi River at St. Louis.

The drilling of wells and pumping of water from the San Fernando Valley aquifer dried up the river by the 1920s. By 1980, the aquifer was supplying drinking water for 800,000 people. In that year, it was discovered that the aquifer had been contaminated. Many wells were shut down, as the area qualified as a Superfund site.

For its first 120 years, the Los Angeles River supplied the town with ample water for homes and farms. It was estimated that the annual flow could have supported a town of 250,000 people—if the water had been managed right. But Angelenos were among the more profligate users of water in the world. In the semi-arid climate, they were forever watering their lawns, gardens, orchards, and vineyards. Later, they needed more to support the growth of commerce and manufacturing. By the beginning of the 20th century, the town realized it quickly would outgrow its river and would need new sources of water.

Legitimate concerns about water supply were exploited to gain backing for a huge engineering and legal effort to bring more water to the city and allow more development. The city fathers had their eyes on the Owens River, about 250 miles (400 km) northeast of Los Angeles in Inyo County, near the Nevada state line. It was a permanent stream of fresh water fed by the melted snows of the eastern Sierra Nevada. It flowed through the Owens River Valley before emptying into the shallow, saline Owens Lake, where it evaporated.

Sometime between 1899 and 1903, Harrison Gray Otis and his son-in-law successor, Harry Chandler, engaged in successful efforts at buying cheap land on the northern outskirts of Los Angeles in the San Fernando Valley. At the same time, they enlisted the help of William Mulholland, chief engineer of the Los Angeles Water Department (later the Los Angeles Department of Water and Power or LADWP), and J.B. Lippencott, of the United States Reclamation Service.

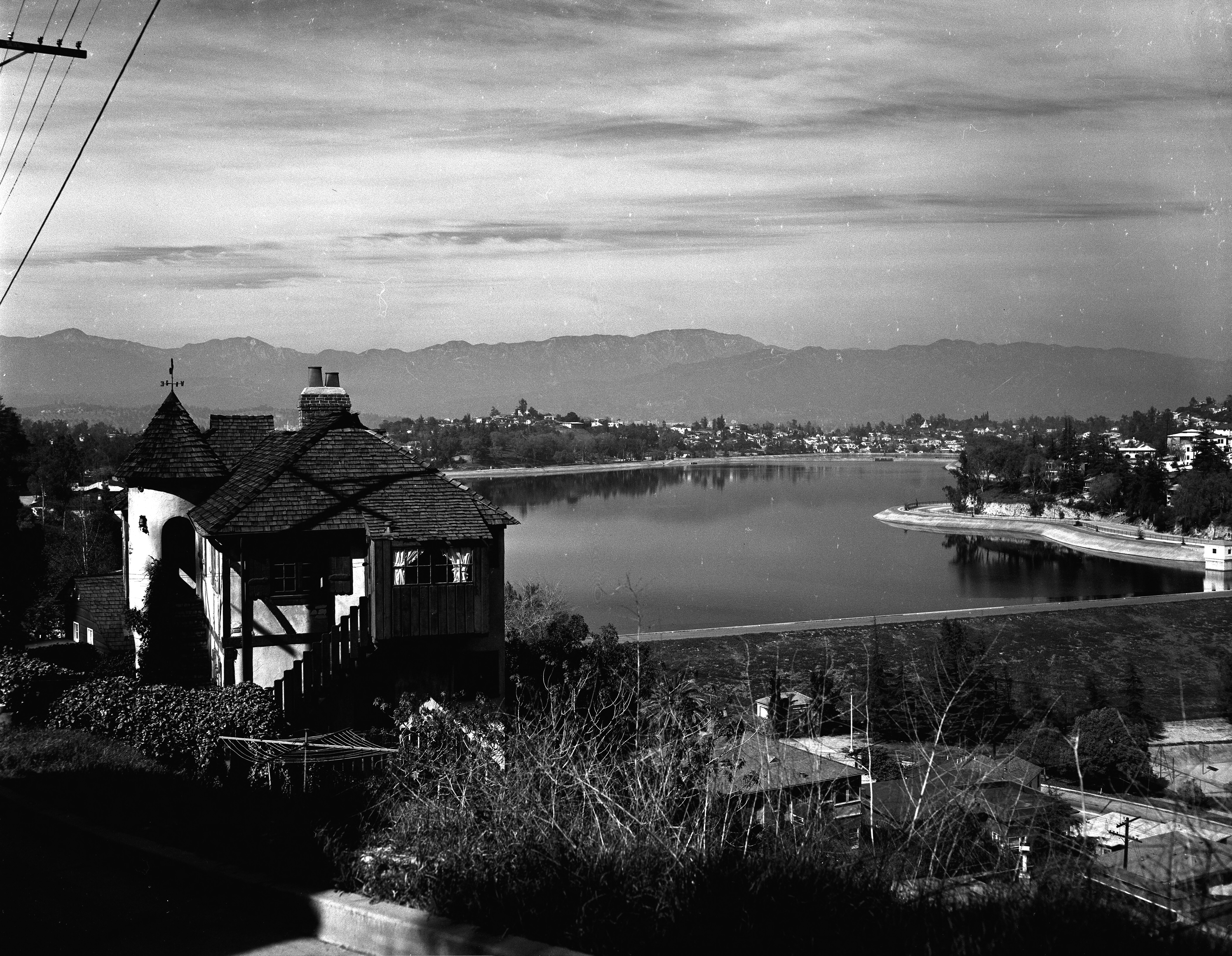
The Silver Lake Reservoir, built in 1906, is one of the oldest reservoirs in Los Angeles.

Lippencott performed water surveys in the Owens Valley for the Service while secretly receiving a salary from the City of Los Angeles. He succeeded in persuading Owens Valley farmers and mutual water companies to pool their interests and surrender the water rights to 200,000 acres (800 km^{2}) of land to Fred Eaton, Lippencott's agent and a former mayor of Los Angeles. Lippencott then resigned from the Reclamation Service, took a job with the Los Angeles Water Department as assistant to Mulholland, and turned over the Reclamation Service maps, field surveys and stream measurements to the city. Those studies served as the basis for designing the longest aqueduct in the world.

By July 1905, the Times began to warn the voters of Los Angeles that the county would soon dry up unless they voted bonds for building the aqueduct. Artificial drought conditions were created when water was run into the sewers to decrease the supply in the reservoirs and residents were forbidden to water their lawns and gardens.

On election day, the people of Los Angeles voted for $22.5 million worth of bonds to build an aqueduct from the Owens River and to defray other expenses of the project. With this money, and with an Act of Congress allowing cities to own property outside their boundaries, the city acquired the land that Eaton had acquired from the Owens Valley farmers and started to build the aqueduct. On the occasion of the opening of the Los Angeles Aqueduct on November 5, 1913, Mulholland's entire speech was five words: "There it is. Take it."

== 20th century ==
=== Hollywood ===
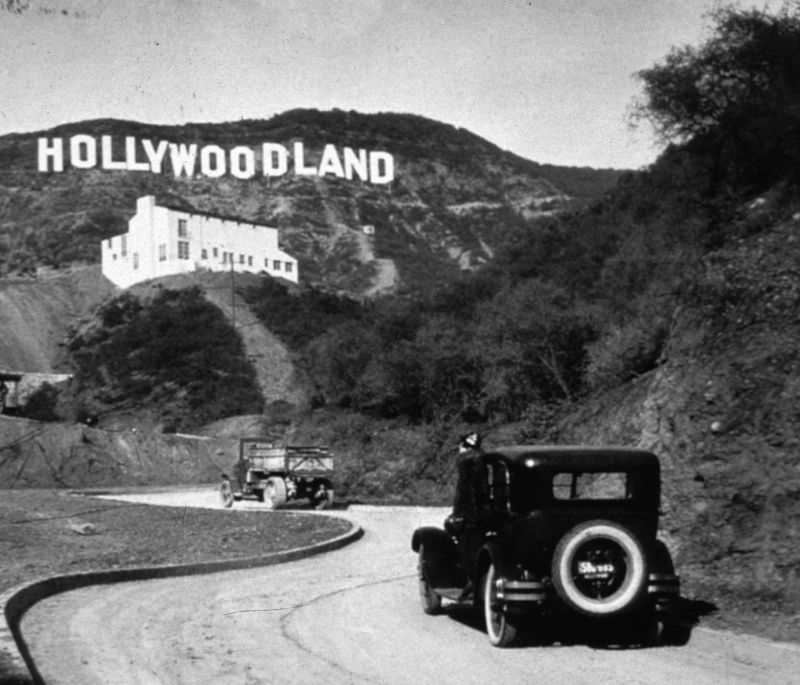
The original Hollywood Sign, 1923

Hollywood has been synonymous worldwide with the film industry for over a hundred years. It was incorporated as the City of Hollywood in 1903, but merged into LA in 1910. In the 1900s movie makers from New York found the sunny, temperate weather more suitable for year-round location shooting. It boomed into the cinematic heart of the United States, and has been the home and workplace of actors, directors and singers that range from small and independent to world-famous, leading to the development of related television and music industries.

=== Notable events ===
Built in 1923, Los Angeles Memorial Coliseum hosted the 1932 Summer Olympics.

Swimming pool desegregation An end to racial segregation in municipal swimming pools was ordered in summer 1931 by a superior court judge after Ethel Prioleau sued the city, complaining that she as a Negro was not allowed to use the pool in nearby Exposition Park but had to travel 3.6 miles to the designated "negro swimming pool."

Summer Olympics Los Angeles hosted the 1932 Summer Olympics. The Los Angeles Memorial Coliseum, which had opened in May, 1923 with a seating capacity of 76,000, was enlarged to accommodate over 100,000 spectators for Olympic events. Olympic Boulevard, a major thoroughfare, honors the occasion. It is still in use by the USC Trojans football team.

Griffith Park Fire A devastating brush fire on October 3, 1933, killed 29 and injured another 150 workers who were clearing brush in Griffith Park.

=== Annexations and consolidations ===
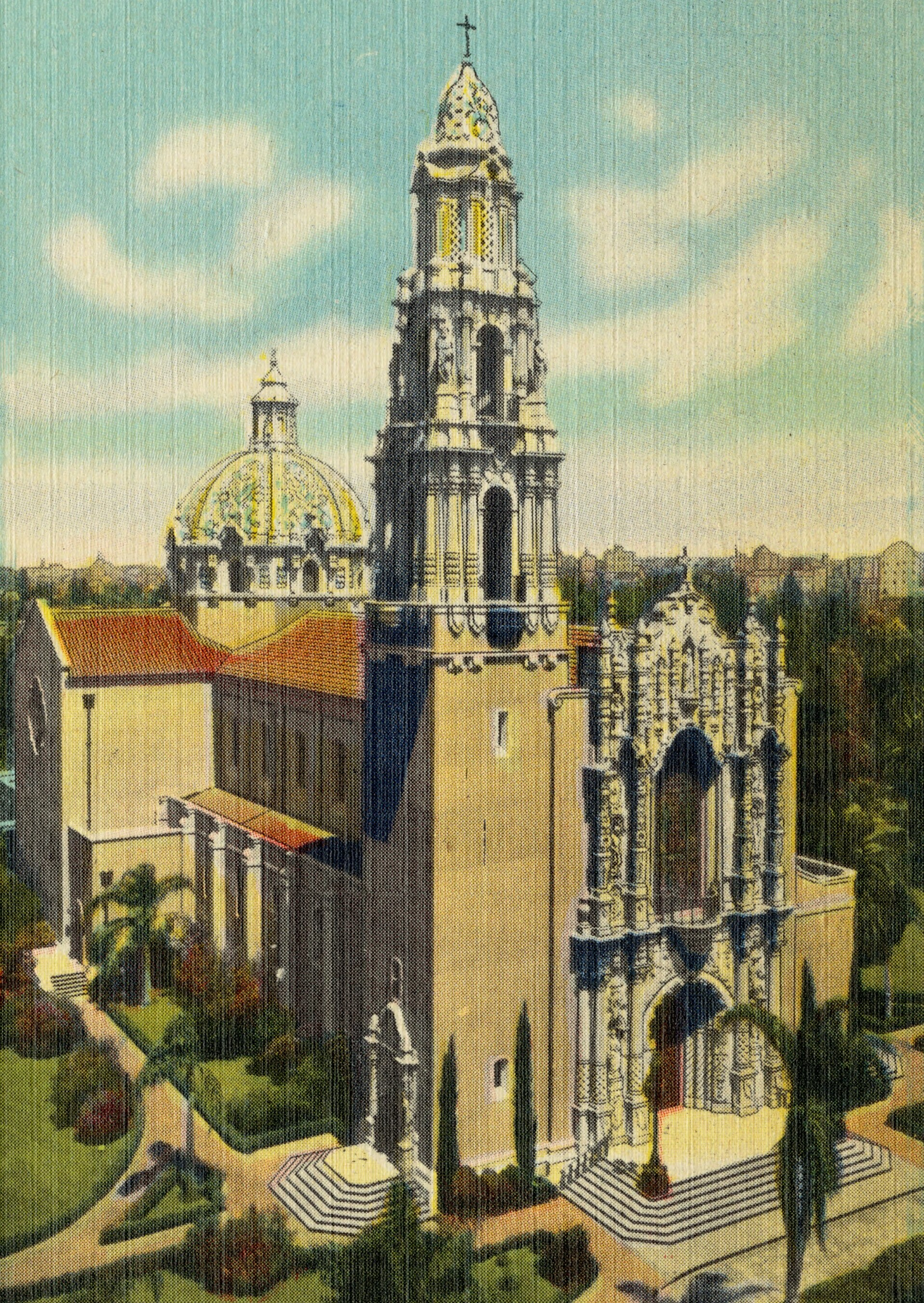
California Churrigueresque style St. Vincent de Paul Church, built in 1925.

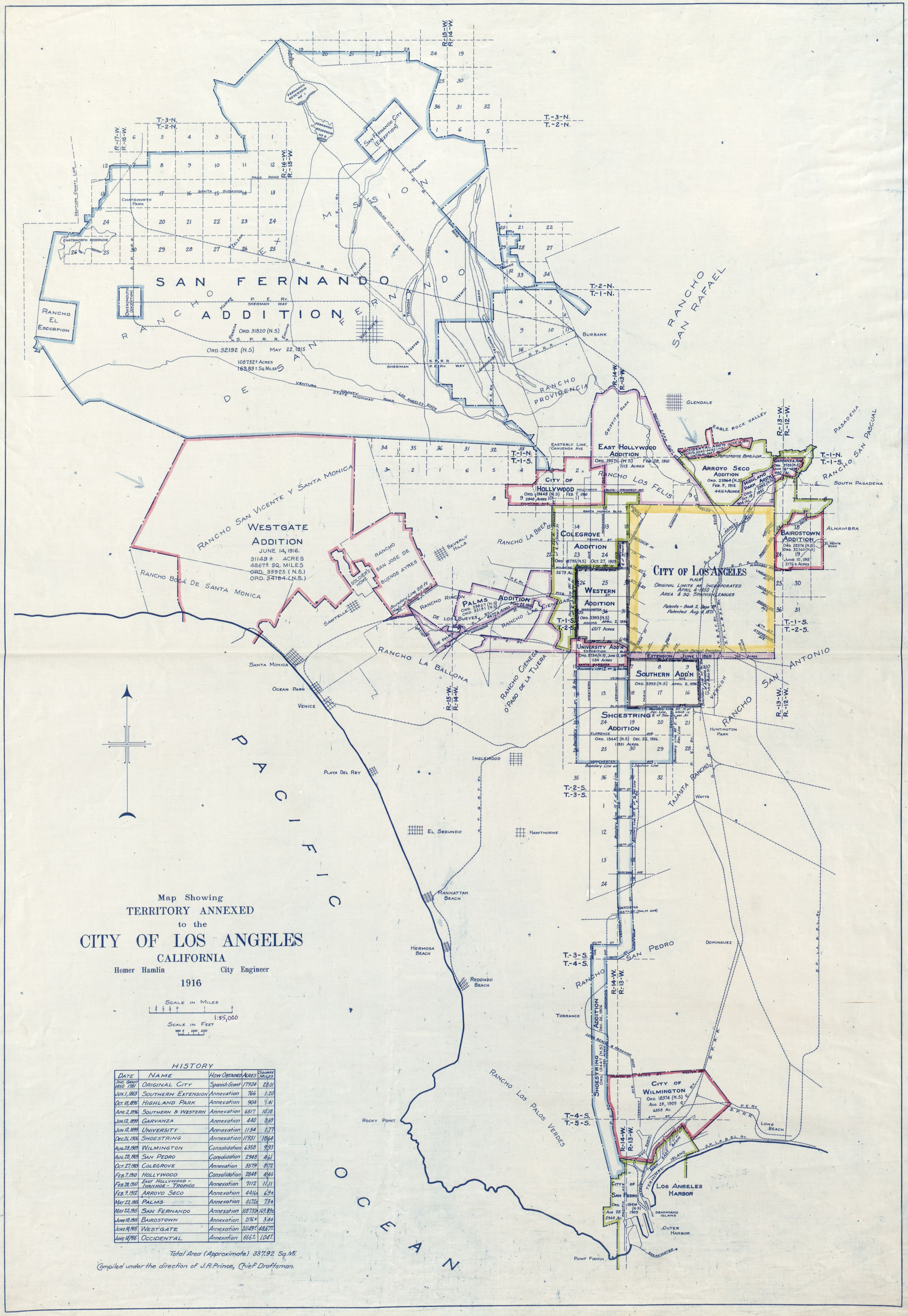
Map of annexations to Los Angeles through 1916

The City of Los Angeles mostly remained within its original 28 mi^{2} (73 km^{2}) land grant until the 1890s. The original city limits are visible even today in the layout of streets that changes from a north–south pattern outside of the original land grant to a pattern that is shifted roughly 15 degrees east of the longitude in and closely around the area now known as Downtown. The first large additions to the city were the districts of Highland Park and Garvanza to the north, and the South Los Angeles area.

In 1906, the approval of the Port of Los Angeles and a change in state law allowed the city to annex the Shoestring, or Harbor Gateway, a narrow and crooked strip of land leading from Los Angeles south towards the port. The port cities of San Pedro and Wilmington were added in 1909 and the city of Hollywood was added in 1910, bringing the city up to 90 square miles (233 km^{2}) and giving it a vertical "barbell" shape. Also added that year was Colegrove, a suburb west northwest of the city near Hollywood; Cahuenga, a township northwest of the former city limits; and a part of Los Feliz was annexed to the city.

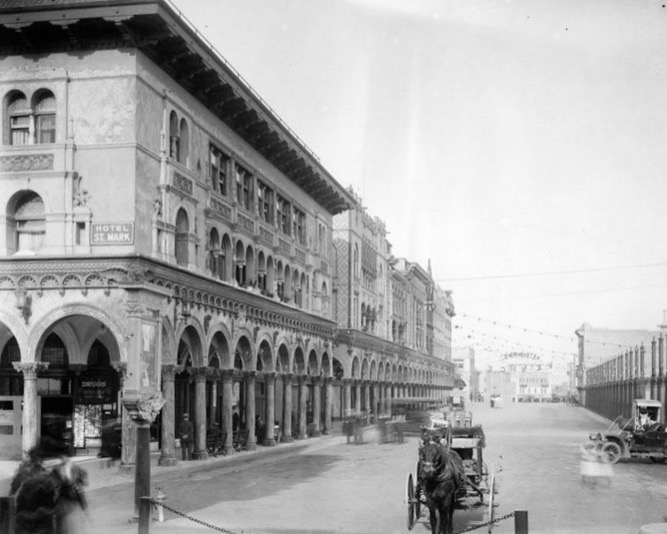
Venice in 1906.

The opening of the Los Angeles Aqueduct provided the city with four times as much water as it required, and the offer of water service became a powerful lure for neighboring communities. The city, saddled with a large bond and excess water, locked in customers through annexation by refusing to supply other communities. Harry Chandler, a major investor in San Fernando Valley real estate, used his Los Angeles Times to promote development near the aqueduct's outlet. By referendum of the residents, 170 square miles (440 km^{2}) of the San Fernando Valley, along with the Palms district, were added to the city in 1915, almost tripling its area, mostly towards the northwest. Over the next 17 years. dozens of additional annexations brought the city's area to 450 square miles (1,165 km^{2}) in 1932. (Numerous small annexations brought the total area of the city up to 469 square miles (1,215 km^{2}) as of 2004.)

Most of the annexed communities were unincorporated towns but 10 incorporated cities were consolidated with Los Angeles: Wilmington (1909), San Pedro (1909), Hollywood (1910), Sawtelle (1922), Hyde Park (1923), Eagle Rock (1923), Venice (1925), Watts (1926), Barnes City (1927), and Tujunga (1932).

=== Civic corruption and police brutality ===
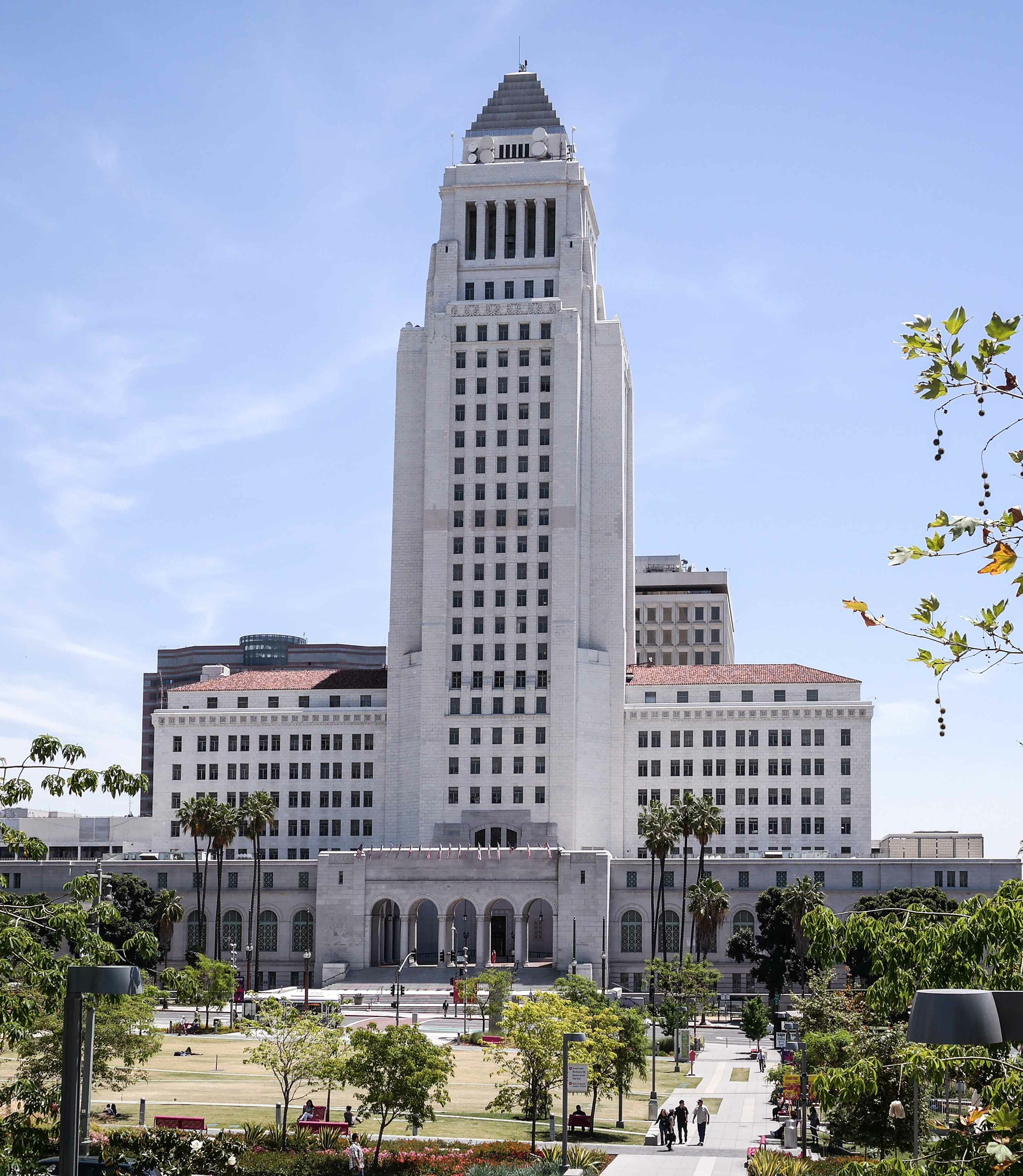
Los Angeles City Hall, built in 1928

The downtown business interests, always eager to attract business and investment to Los Angeles, were also eager to distance their town from the criminal underworld that defined the stories of Chicago and New York. In spite of their concerns, massive corruption in City Hall and the Los Angeles Police Department (LAPD)—and the fight against it—were dominant themes in the city's story from early 20th-century to the 1950s.

In the 1920s, for example, it was common practice for the city's mayor, councilmen, and attorneys to take contributions from madams, bootleggers, and gamblers. The top aide of the mayor was involved with a protection racket. Thugs with eastern-Mafia connections were involved in often violent conflicts over bootlegging and horse-racing turf.

In 1933, the new mayor Frank Shaw started giving contracts without competitive bids and paying city employees to favor crony contractors. The city's Vice Squad functioned citywide as the enforcer and collector of the city's organized crime, with revenues going to the pockets of city officials right up to the mayor. The mayor's brother was selling jobs in the Los Angeles Police Department.

In 1937, the owner of downtown's Clifton's Cafeteria, Clifford Clinton led a citizen's campaign to clean up city hall. He and other reformers served on a Grand Jury investigating the charges of corruption. In a minority report, the reformers wrote:

A portion of the underworld profits have been used in financing campaigns [of] ... city and county officials in vital positions ... [While] the district attorney's office, sheriff's office, and Los Angeles Police Department work in complete harmony and never interfere with ... important figures in the underworld.

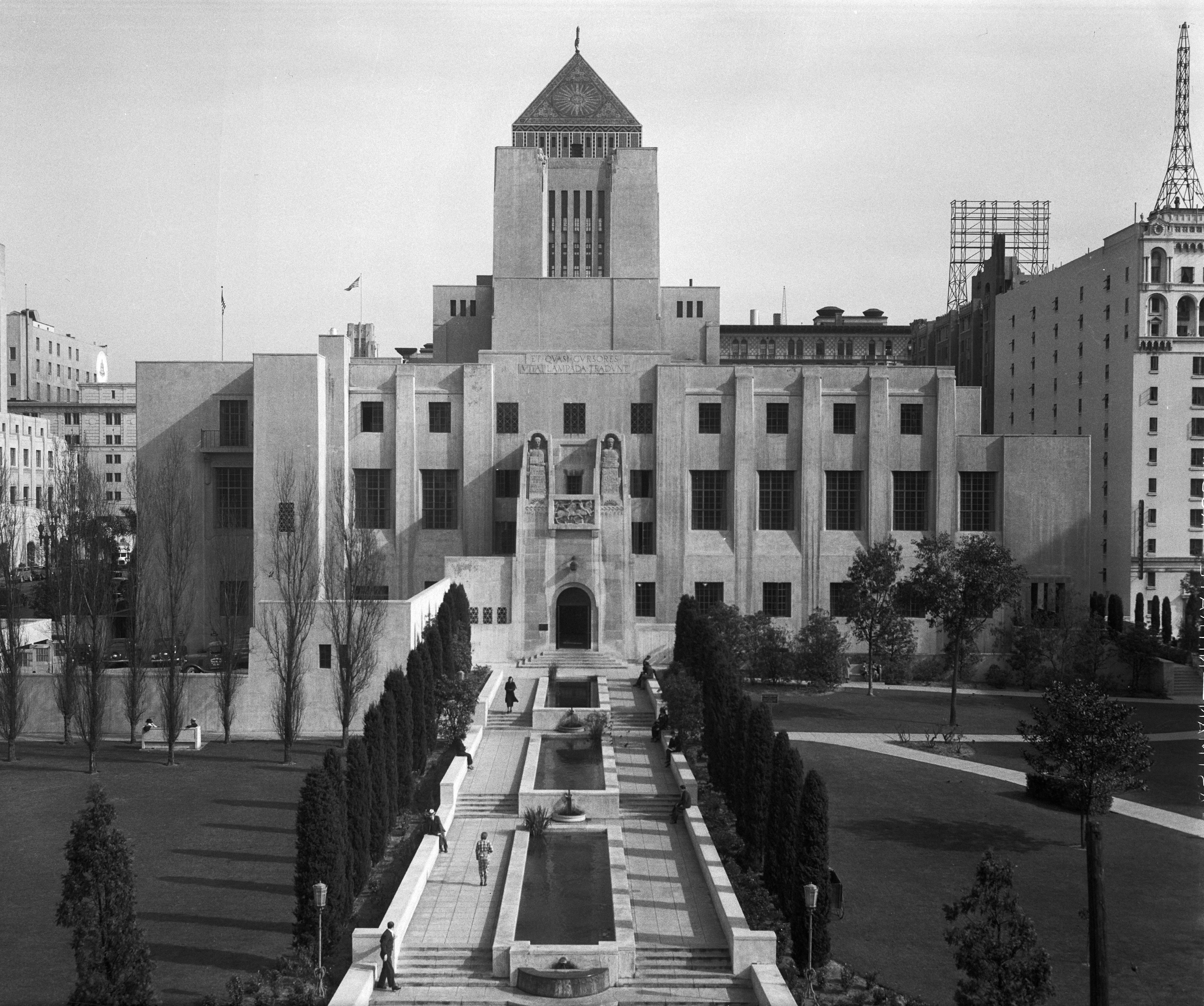
The Central Library of Los Angeles Public Library, c. 1935.

The police Intelligence Squad spied on anyone who was suspected of criticizing the police. They included journalist Carey McWilliams, the District Attorney, Judge Fletcher Bowron, and two of the county supervisors.

The courage of Clinton, Superior Court Judge and later Mayor, Fletcher Bowron, and former police detective Harry J. Raymond turned the tide. The police became nervous causing the Intelligence Squad to blow up Raymond's car, nearly killing him. The public was infuriated by the bombing that it voted Shaw out of office, one of the first big-city recalls in the country's history. The head of the intelligence squad, Earl E. Kynette, was convicted and sentenced to two years to life. Police Chief James Davis and 23 other officers were forced to resign.

Fletcher Bowron replaced Shaw as mayor in 1938 to preside over one of the dynamic periods in the history of the city. His "Los Angeles Urban Reform Revival" brought major changes to the government of Los Angeles.

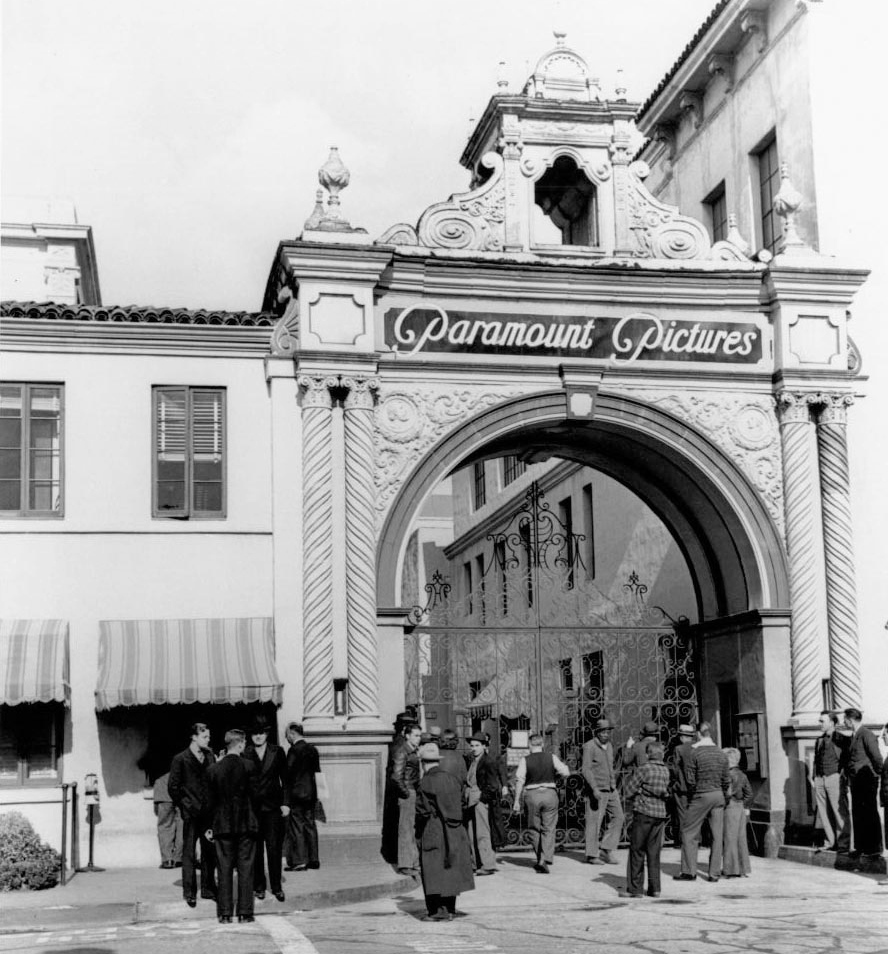
Paramount Pictures, c. 1940

In 1950, he appointed William H. Parker as chief of police. Parker pushed for more independence from political pressures that enabled him to create a more professionalized police force. The public supported him and voted in charter changes that isolated the police department from the rest of government.

Through the 1960s, the LAPD was promoted as one of the more efficient departments in the world. But Parker's administration increasingly was charged with police brutality—resulting from his recruiting of officers from the South with strong anti-black and anti-Mexican attitudes.

=== LAX: Los Angeles International Airport ===
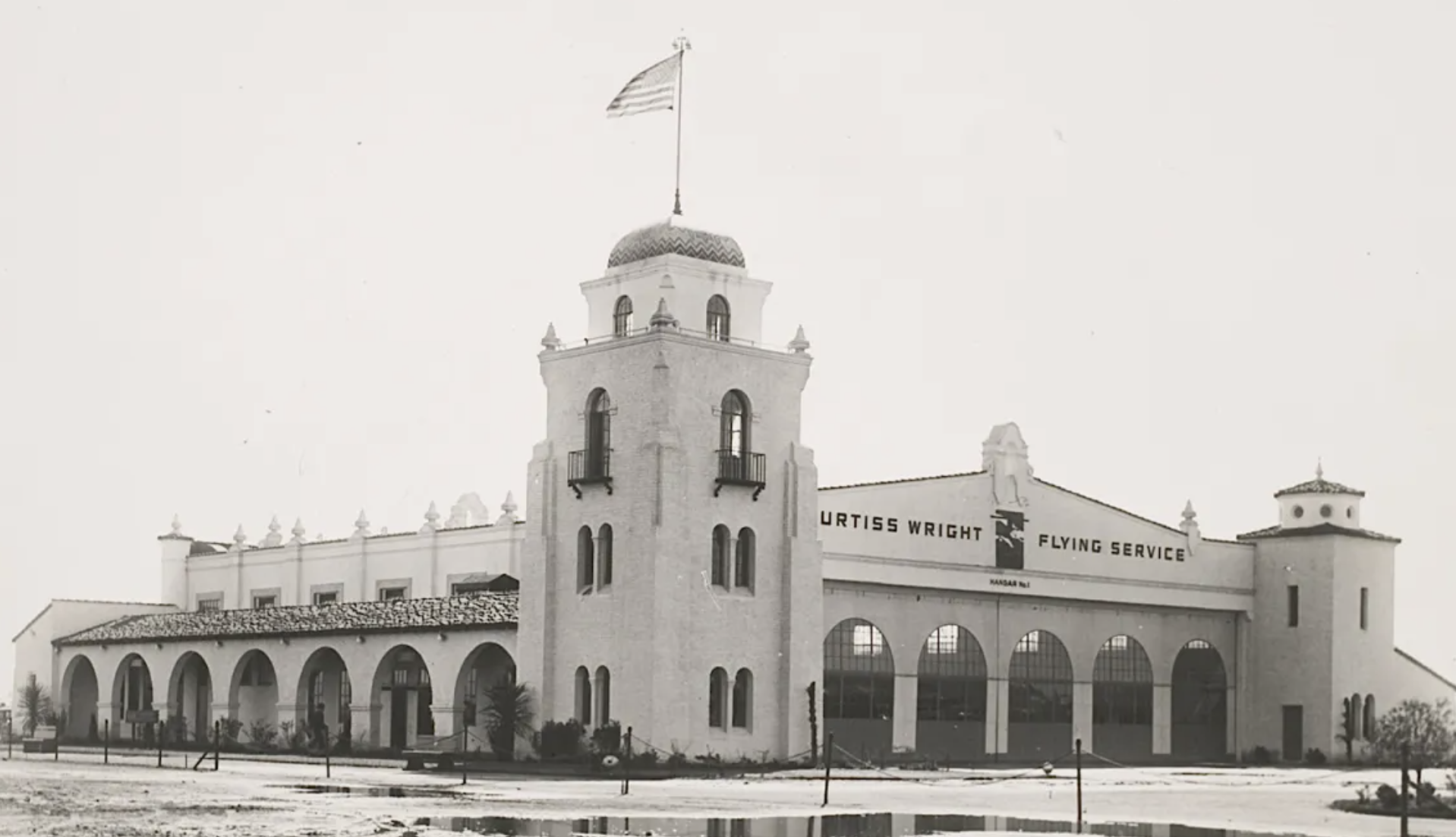
Hangar No. 1 was the first structure at Los Angeles Airport, built in 1929.

Mines Field opened as the private airport in 1930, and the city purchased it to be the municipal airfield in 1937. The name became Los Angeles Airport in 1941 and Los Angeles International Airport in 1949. In the 1930s, the main airline airports were Hollywood Burbank Airport (then known as Union Air Terminal, and later Lockheed) in Burbank and the Grand Central Airport in Glendale. In 1940, the airlines were all at Burbank except for Mexicana's three departures a week from Glendale; in late 1946 most airline flights moved to LAX, but Burbank always retained a few. Since then, there has been relentless expansion and the spinoff of hotels and warehouses nearby.

=== World War II ===
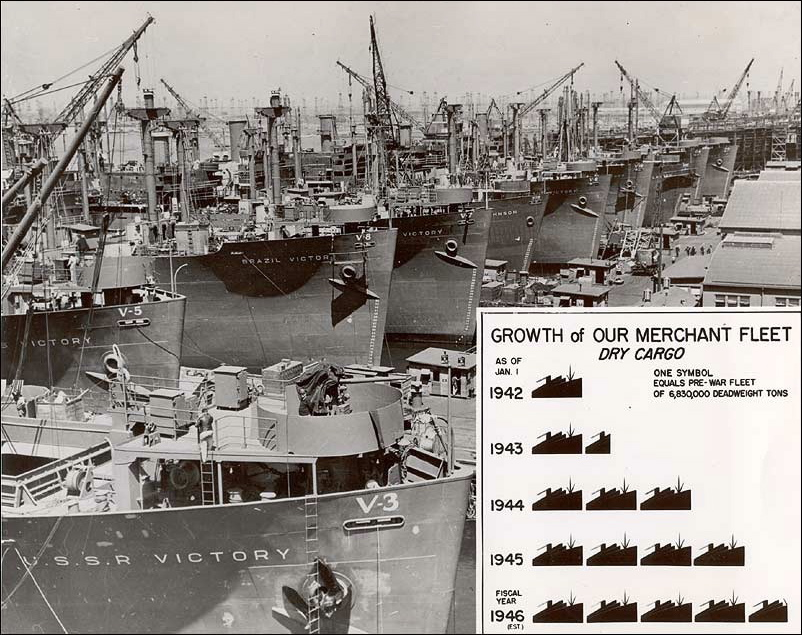
During World War II, the California Shipbuilding Corporation on Terminal Island was among the many builders that made the Port of Los Angeles one of the largest shipyards in the country.

During World War II, Los Angeles grew as a center for production of aircraft, ships, war supplies, and ammunition. Aerospace employers headquartered in the Los Angeles metropolitan area like Hughes Aircraft Company, Northrop Corporation, Douglas Aircraft Company, Vultee Aircraft (later merged into Convair in 1943), and Lockheed Corporation, were able to provide the nation's demand for the war effort in producing strategic bombers and fighter aircraft like B-17s, B-25s, A-36s, and P-51 Mustangs needed to bomb the war machine of the Axis powers. As a result, the Los Angeles area grew faster than any other major metropolitan area in the U.S. and experienced more of the traumas of war while doing so. By 1943, the population of Los Angeles County was larger than 37 states, and was home to one in every 40 U.S. citizens, as millions across the U.S. came to Southern California to find employment in the defense industries.

The Japanese-American community in Los Angeles was greatly impacted since Japan's attack on Pearl Harbor pulled the U.S. into World War II, and America feared that the fifth column was widespread among the community. In response, President Franklin D. Roosevelt issued Executive Order 9066, authorizing military commanders to exclude "any or all persons" from certain areas in the name of national defense. The Western Defense Command began ordering Japanese-Americans living on the West Coast to present themselves for "evacuation" from the newly created military zones. This included many Los Angeles families, of which 80,000 were relocated to the Japanese-American internment camps throughout the duration of the war.

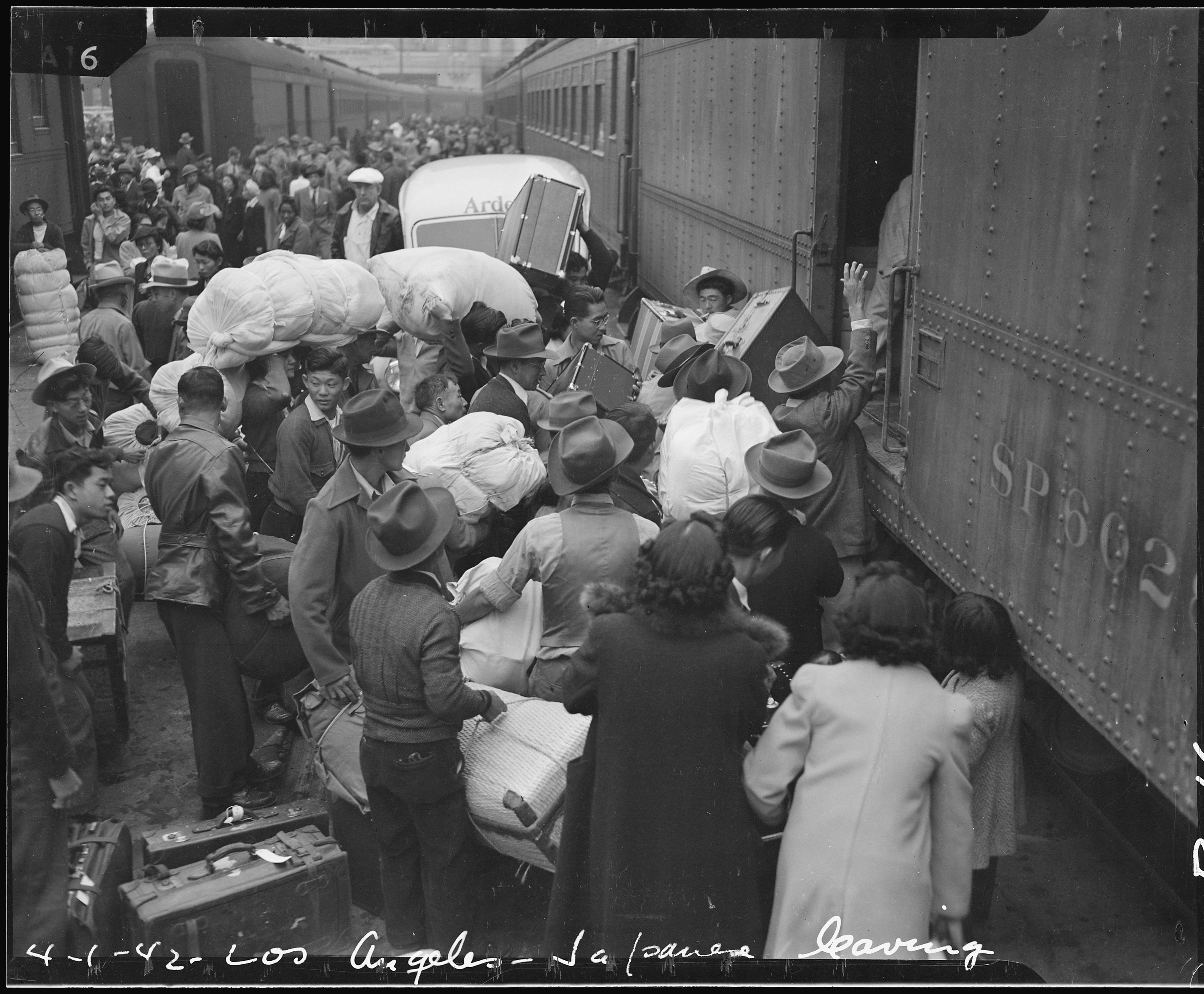
Japanese Americans being forcibly removed to the Japanese American internment camps, c. 1942-45

The war also lured a large number of African Americans from the rural impoverished Southern states to the Los Angeles area in the second chapter of the Great Migration, due to manpower industrial shortages and Executive Order 8802, which prohibited discrimination in wartime defense industries. Lonnie Bunch, a longtime historian with the Smithsonian Institution, wrote, "Between 1942-1945, some 340,000 Blacks settled in California, 200,000 of whom migrated to Los Angeles." Most of these Black migrants to Los Angeles came from South Central states like Louisiana, Texas, Mississippi, Arkansas, and Oklahoma. African Americans particularly benefited from defense jobs created in Los Angeles County during the war, especially Terminal Island, where it was one of the first places of integrated, defense-related work on the West Coast. Though Jim Crow laws did not exist in Los Angeles as it had in the South, black migrants continued to face racial discrimination in most aspects of life, especially widespread housing segregation and redlining due to overcrowding and perceived lower property value during and after the war, in which they were restricted from advanced opportunities in affluent white areas and confined to an exclusive-black majority area of South Central Los Angeles.

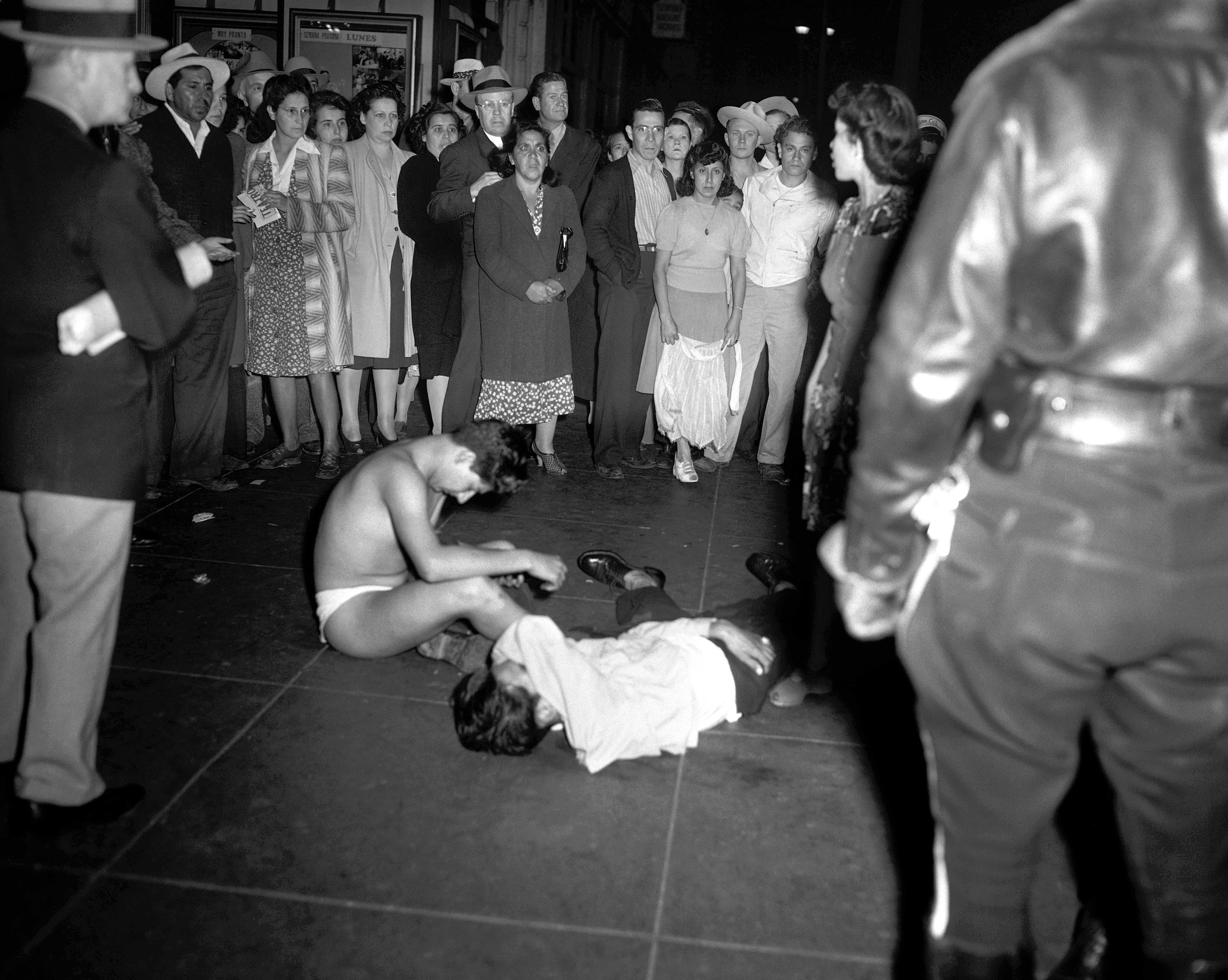
Mexican Americans (Chicanos) being beaten by the U.S. servicemen during the Zoot Suit Riots in 1943

As with a few other wartime industrial cities in the U.S., Los Angeles experienced a racial-related conflict stemming from the Zoot Suit Riots in June 1943, in which American servicemen and local Whites attacked young Mexican-Americans in zoot suits. Many military personnel regarded the zoot suits as unpatriotic and flamboyant in time of war, as they used a lot of fabric, coupled with widespread racism against Mexicans and Mexican-Americans as unintelligent and inferior. The Los Angeles Police Department stood by as the rioting happened, arresting hundreds of Hispanic residents instead of the attackers. Riots against Latinos in Los Angeles also erupted in a similar fashion in other cities in California, Texas, and Arizona as well as northern cities like Chicago, Philadelphia, and Detroit.

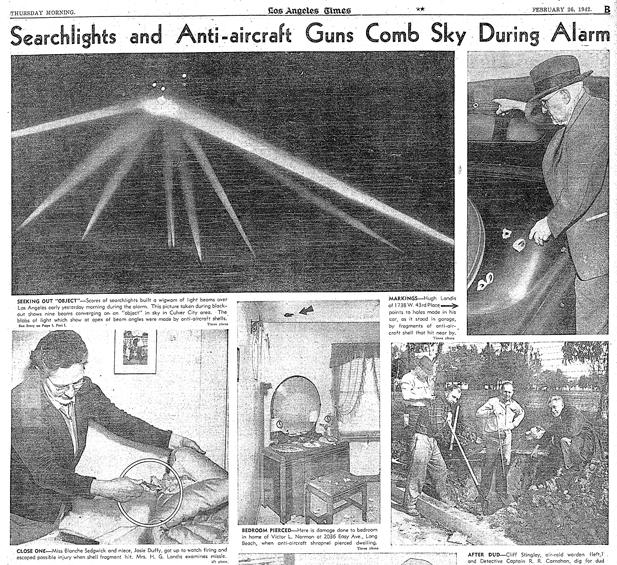
The "Battle of Los Angeles" was a false alarm invasion by Japan in 1942

Los Angeles also saw an influx of “Defense Okies”, poor white migrants from the Southern Plains states (Texas, Oklahoma, Arkansas, Kansas, and Missouri) who came to the area for work in defense plants.

While Los Angeles County never faced enemy bombing and invasion, it nevertheless became an integral part of the American Theater on the night of February 24–25, 1942, during the false Battle of Los Angeles, which occurred a day after the Japanese naval bombardment of Ellwood in Santa Barbara, California, 80 miles from Los Angeles. Reacting to a report that enemy planes had been spotted over Los Angeles, anti-aircraft gunners in the area fired on the approaching aircraft what was later known to be a U.S. Army weather balloon. Lasting for two hours, five people died in the "Battle of Los Angeles", from car crashes in the confusing darkness to people having heart attacks due to loud anti-aircraft gun bursts. In spite of this, the Japanese had plans to actually bomb Los Angeles with giant seaplanes in anticipation of the proposed large-scale invasion of the continental United States. Those raids never came about, but the Japanese had the planes and wherewithal to accomplish such a raid throughout the war.

=== Postwar: Baby boomers ===
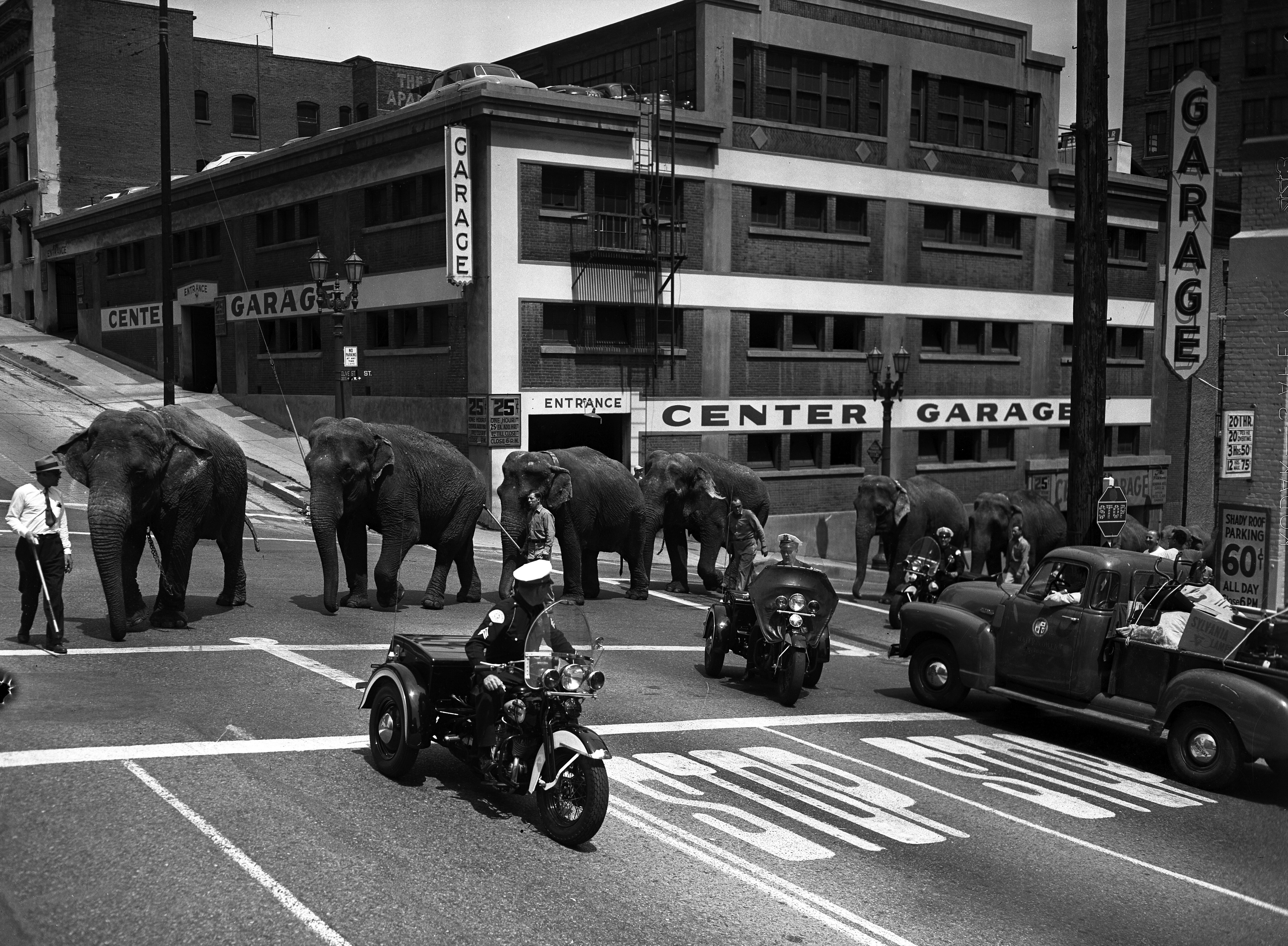
Circus elephants with a police escort in Downtown LA, 1953.

After the war, hundreds of land developers bought land cheap, subdivided it, built on it, and got rich. Real-estate development replaced oil and agriculture as Southern California's principal industry. In July 1955, Walt Disney opened the world's first theme park called Disneyland in Anaheim. Nine years later, Universal Studios opened its first theme park with the public studio tour tram at Universal City. This later touched off a theme park war between Disney and Universal that continue on to the present day. In 1958, Major League Baseball's Dodgers and Giants left New York City and came to Los Angeles and San Francisco, respectively. The population of California expanded dramatically, to nearly 20 million by 1970. This was the coming-of-age of the baby boom. By 1950, Los Angeles was an industrial and financial giant created by war production and migration. Los Angeles assembled more cars than any city other than Detroit, made more tires than any city but Akron, Ohio, made more furniture than Grand Rapids, Michigan, and stitched more clothes than any city except New York. In addition, it was the national capital for the production of motion pictures, Army and Navy training films, radio programs and, within a few years, television shows. Construction boomed as tract houses were built in ever expanding suburban communities financed by the GI Bill for veterans and the Federal Housing Administration. Popular music of the period bore titles such as "California Girls", "California Dreamin'", "San Francisco", "Do You Know the Way to San Jose?" and "Hotel California". These reflected the Californian promise of easy living in a paradisiacal climate. The surfing culture burgeoned.

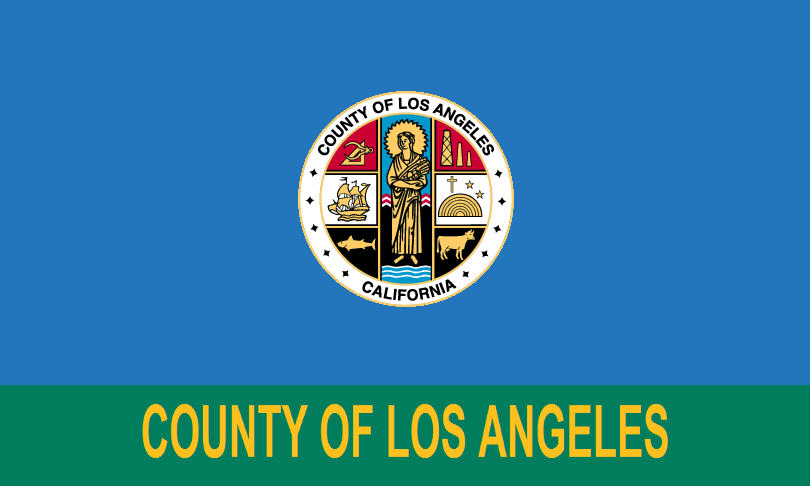
The former Los Angeles County flag, used from 1967 to 2004.

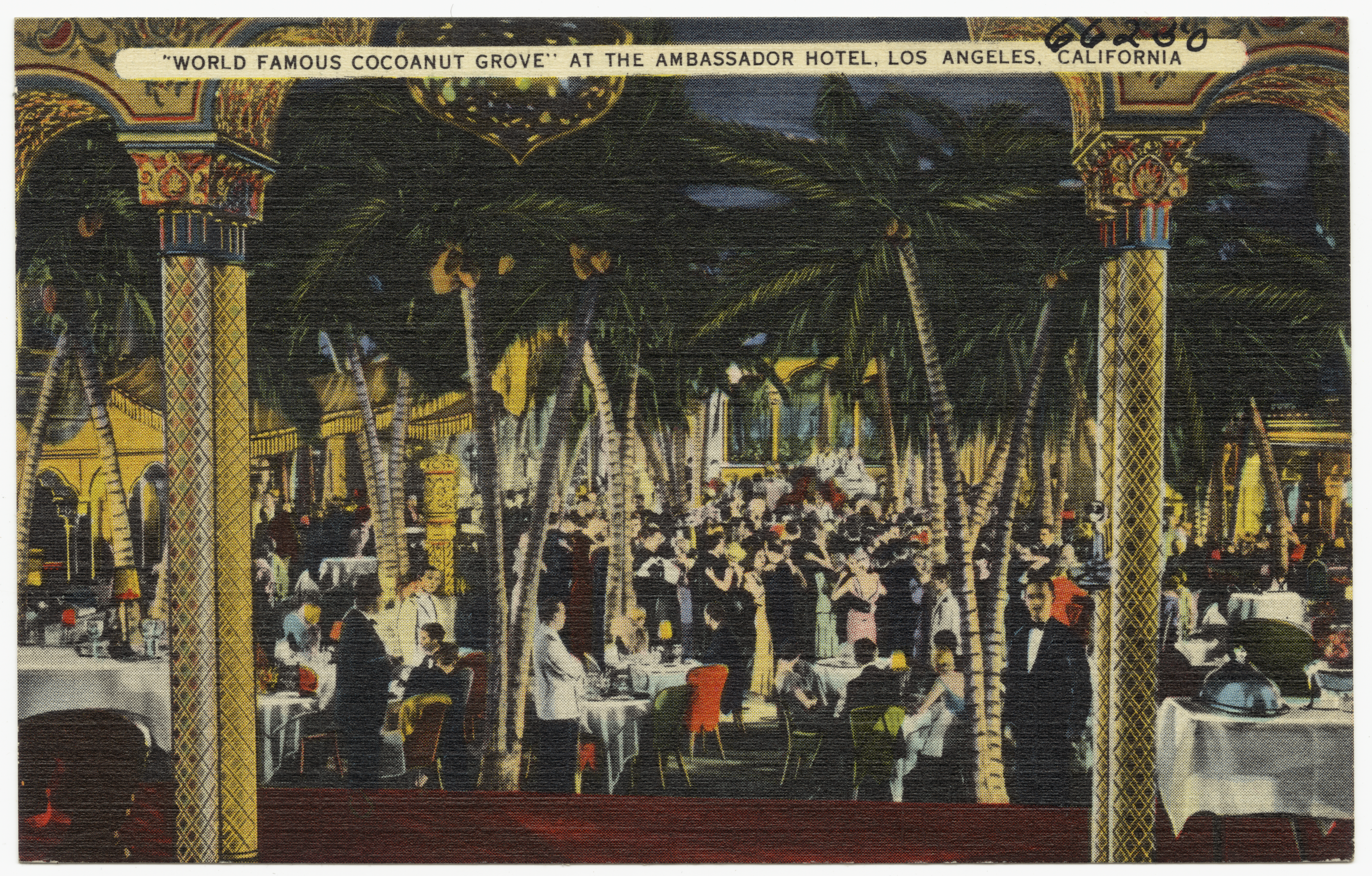
The Cocoanut Grove at the Ambassador Hotel was one of the most premier nightclubs in Los Angeles, from 1921 until the 1960s.

Los Angeles continued to spread, particularly with the development of the San Fernando Valley and the building of the freeways launched in the 1940s. When the local street car system went out of business due to the gas/automobile industry, Los Angeles became a city shaped around the automobile, with all the social, health and political problems that this dependence produces. The famed urban sprawl of Los Angeles became a notable feature of the town, and the pace of the growth accelerated in the first decades of the 20th century. The San Fernando Valley, sometimes called "America's Suburb", became a favorite site of developers, and the city began growing past its roots downtown toward the ocean and towards the east. The immense problem with air pollution (smog) that had developed by the early 1970s also caused a backlash: Schools were closed routinely in urban areas for "smog days" when the ozone levels became too unhealthy, and the hills surrounding urban areas were seldom visible even within a mile, Californians were ready for changes. Over the next three decades, California enacted some of the strictest anti-smog regulations in the United States and has been a leader in encouraging nonpolluting strategies for various industries, including automobiles. For example, carpool lanes normally allow only vehicles with two/three or more occupants (whether the base number is two or three depends on what freeway you are on), but electric cars can use the lanes with only a single occupant. As a result, smog is significantly reduced from its peak, although local Air Quality Management Districts still monitor the air and generally encourage people to avoid polluting activities on hot days when smog is expected to be at its worst.

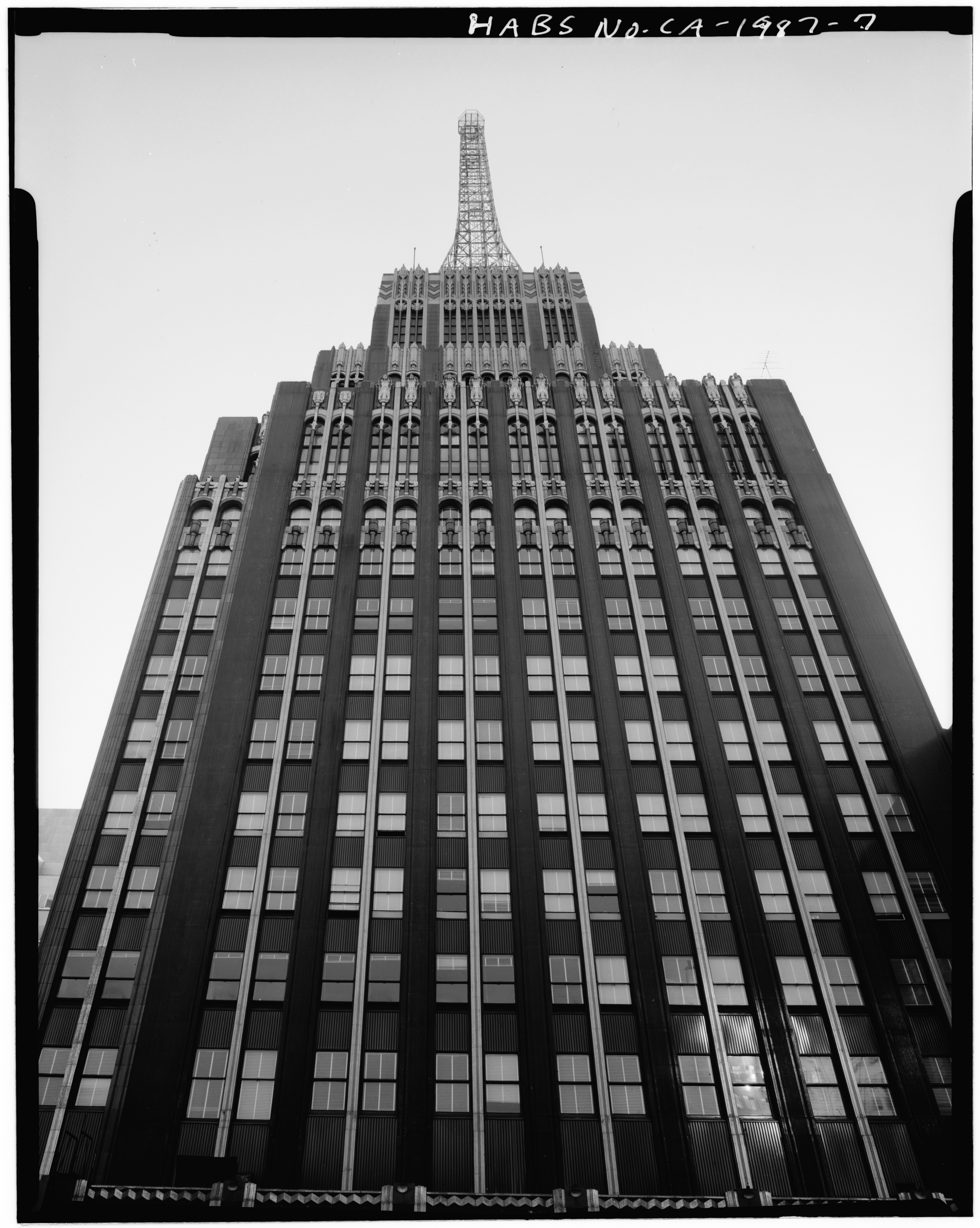
The Richfield Tower, an Art Deco landmark of 1929, was demolished in 1969.

Beginning November 6, 1961, Los Angeles suffered three days of destructive brush fires. The Bel-Air—Brentwood and Santa Ynez fires destroyed 484 expensive homes and 21 other buildings along with 15,810 acres (64 km^{2}) of brush in the Bel-Air, Brentwood, and Topanga Canyon neighborhoods. Most of the homes destroyed had wooden shake roofs, which not only led to their own loss but also sent firebrands up to three miles (5 km) away. Despite this, few changes were made to the building codes to prevent future losses.

The repeal of a law limiting building height and the controversial redevelopment of Bunker Hill, which destroyed a picturesque though decrepit neighborhood, ushered in the construction of a new generation of skyscrapers. Bunker Hill's 62-floor First Interstate Building (later named Aon Center) was the highest in Los Angeles when it was completed in 1973. It was surpassed by the Library Tower (now called the U.S. Bank Tower) a few blocks to the north in 1990, a 310 m (1,018 ft) building that is the tallest west of the Mississippi. Outside of Downtown, the Wilshire Corridor is lined with tall buildings, particularly near Westwood. Century City, developed on the former 20th Century Fox back lot, has become another center of high-rise construction on the Westside.

=== Racially restrictive housing covenants ===
Racially restrictive housing covenants were a major part of Los Angeles housing development and selling of real estate. Racially restrictive covenants were court private agreements included in title deeds that prohibited the selling of property to certain races. The first racially restrictive covenant in Los Angeles dates to 1902 and used the term non-Caucasians to restrict people of color from dwelling in that home. Other language used in covenants excluded specific ethnic groups and sometimes only allowed "non-Whites" to occupy a property if they were domestic workers. There was a tendency to exclude Mexican Americans, despite they were legally "White" due to Spanish ancestry, Mexican immigrants tend to be indigenous people or mestizo.

Racially restrictive covenants were implemented by housing developers, real estate agencies, and homeowners associations for the purpose of creating racial and class segregated neighborhoods. Racially restrictive covenants were also implemented in housing developments to secure homogeneous and economically stable neighborhoods. The Janss Investment Company built the community of Westwood. They included racial restrictions in all of their properties that specifically excluded "any person who is not of the White or the Caucasian race". Examples of communities in Los Angeles that were built with racial restrictions in deeds are Thousand Oaks, Palos Verdes, Beverly Hills, Bel Air, Westchester, Panorama City, Westside Village, and Toluca Woods among others.

In 1892, the federal courts ruled that neither state nor city governments could discriminate but upheld the right to enter into racial and class restrictive covenants. In the period between 1900 and 1920 Los Angeles experienced a boom in housing development during which racially restrictive covenants became widespread. By 1939, almost 47% of Los Angeles County residential neighborhoods included racially restrictive covenants.

Restricting people of color from many neighborhoods across Los Angeles resulted in the formation of multiracial neighborhoods. These neighborhoods were notably poor and composed of Blacks, Latinos, Asian Americans, Jews, and Italians. Among multiracial neighborhoods in Los Angeles are Boyle Heights, Watts, Belvedere, and South Los Angeles. In the 1930s, Okies from the Central United States settled in the Northern ends of Downtown Los Angeles, mainly they were White, but a large percentage were Cherokee (Native Americans) from Oklahoma.

Racially restrictive covenants were finally overturned in two landmark cases. Shelley V. Kraemer in 1948 prohibited racially restrictive covenants and invalidated their use in court. The 1956 Barrows V. Jackson case the Supreme Court ruled that racially restrictive covenants were unconstitutional under the 14th amendment. It stated that "The enforcement of a covenant forbidding use and occupancy of real estate by non-Caucasians, by an action at law in a state court to recover damages from a co-covenantor for a breach of the covenant, is barred by the Fourteenth Amendment of the Federal Constitution." In 1964, California voters approved Proposition 14 which attempted to validate housing discrimination. However, the proposition was repealed and deemed unconstitutional by the California Supreme Court. While many home deeds in Los Angeles still contain restrictive covenant clauses, they are not legally enforceable.

=== Economic and demographic changes ===
The last of the automobile factories shut down in the 1990s; the tire factories and steel mills left earlier. Most of the agricultural and dairy operations that were still prospering in the 1950s have moved to outlying counties while the furniture industry has relocated to Mexico and other low-wage nations. Aerospace production has dropped significantly since the end of the Cold War or moved to states with better tax conditions, and movie producers sometimes find cheaper places to produce films, television programs and commercials. However, the film, television and music industries are still based in LA, which is home to large numbers of well-paid stars, executives and technicians. Many studios still operate in Los Angeles, such as CBS Television City at the corner of Fairfax Avenue and Beverly Boulevard and 20th Century Fox in Century City. The manufacture of clothing began on a large scale in the early 20th century. The fashion industry emerged in the 1920s with an emphasis on sportswear and leisure clothing, and expanded after 1945 to second place behind New York. Toyota opened its first overseas office in Hollywood in 1957, and sold 257 cars in the U.S. It moved operations to Torrance in 1982 because of easy access to port facilities and the LAX airport. In 2013 it sold 2.2 million vehicles in the U.S. In 2014, it announced it would move 3000 of its employees to Plano, Texas, near Dallas, to be closer to its American factories.

The ports of Los Angeles and Long Beach make up the largest harbor complex in the U.S., handling 44% of all goods imported by cargo container. In 2007, the equivalent of 7.85 million 40-foot shipping containers entered through the ports, with most then moving along the region's highways to massive rail yards and warehouses before heading to the nation's interior. International trade has generated hundreds of thousands of jobs in Southern California. Moving goods is currently one of the largest industry in the region. It helps provide lower-cost imports to consumers across the United States. The ports are among the region's more valuable economic engines.

The desire for residential housing in the downtown area has led to gentrification. Historic commercial buildings have been renovated as condos (while maintaining the original outside design), and many new apartment and condominium towers and complexes are being built.

Many communities in Los Angeles have changed their ethnic character over this period of time. For many decades, the population was predominantly White and mostly American-born until the late 20th century. Until the 1960s, the average Los Angeles resident was a White Protestant of Midwestern origin. South L.A. was mostly White until the 1950s, but then became predominantly black until the 1990s, and is now mainly Latino. While the Latino community within the City of Los Angeles was once centered on the Eastside, it now extends throughout the city. The San Fernando Valley, which represented a bastion of white flight in the 1960s and provided the votes that allowed Sam Yorty to defeat the first election run by Tom Bradley, is now as ethnically diverse as the rest of the city on the other side of the Hollywood Hills.

=== 1980s ===
During the latter decades of the 20th century, the city saw a massive increase of street gangs. At the same time, crack cocaine became widely available and dominated by gangs in the 1980s. Although gangs were disproportionately confined to lower-income inner-city sections, fear knew no boundaries citywide. Since the early 1990s, the city saw a decrease in crime and gang violence with rising prices in housing, revitalization, urban development, and heavy police vigilance in many parts of the city. With its reputation, it had led to Los Angeles being referred as "The Gang Capital of America".

Since the 1980s, there has been an increasing gap between the rich and the poor, making Los Angeles one of the most socioeconomically divided cities in the United States.

A subway system, developed and built through the 1980s as a major goal of mayor Tom Bradley, stretches from North Hollywood to Union Station and connects to light rail lines that extend to the neighboring cities of Long Beach, Norwalk, and Pasadena, among others. Also, a commuter rail system, Metrolink, has been added that stretches from nearby Ventura and Simi Valley to San Bernardino, Orange County, and Riverside. The funding of the Los Angeles County Metropolitan Transportation Authority project is funded by a half cent tax increase added in the mid-1980s, which yields $400 million every month. Although the regional transit system is growing, subway expansion was halted in the 1990s over methane gas concerns, political conflict, and construction and financing problems during Red Line Subway project, which culminated in a massive sinkhole on Hollywood Boulevard. As a result, the original subway plans have been delayed for decades as light rail systems, dedicated busways, and limited-stop "Rapid" bus routes have become the preferred means of mass transit in LA's expanding series of gridlocked, congested corridors.

The overall metropolitan L.A. economy was healthy, and in one five-year boom period (1985 to 1990), it attracted 400,000 working immigrants (mostly from Asia and Mexico) and about 575,000 workers from elsewhere in the U.S. The jobs offered depended largely on educational qualifications. Half of the immigrants from abroad owed their employment to the immigrant economy with Asian entrepreneurs employing Latino workers. Large-scale economic changes have brought major social changes with them. While unemployment dropped in Los Angeles in the 1990s, the newly created jobs tended to be low-wage jobs filled by recent immigrants; the number of poor families increased from 36% to 43% of the population of Los Angeles County during this time. At the same time, the number of immigrants from Mexico, Central America and Latin America has made Los Angeles a "majority minority" city that will soon (perhaps in the 2020s) be majority Latino, the first time since California statehood in 1850 before Anglo-American settlers came to the city. The unemployment rate dropped from 6.9% to 6.8% in 2002, jumped during the recession of 2008, and hovered around 11-12% in 2011.

Social critic Mike Davis argued that attempts to "revitalize" downtown Los Angeles decreases public space and further alienates poor and minority populations. This enforced geographical separation of diverse populations goes back to the city's earliest days.

=== 1990s ===
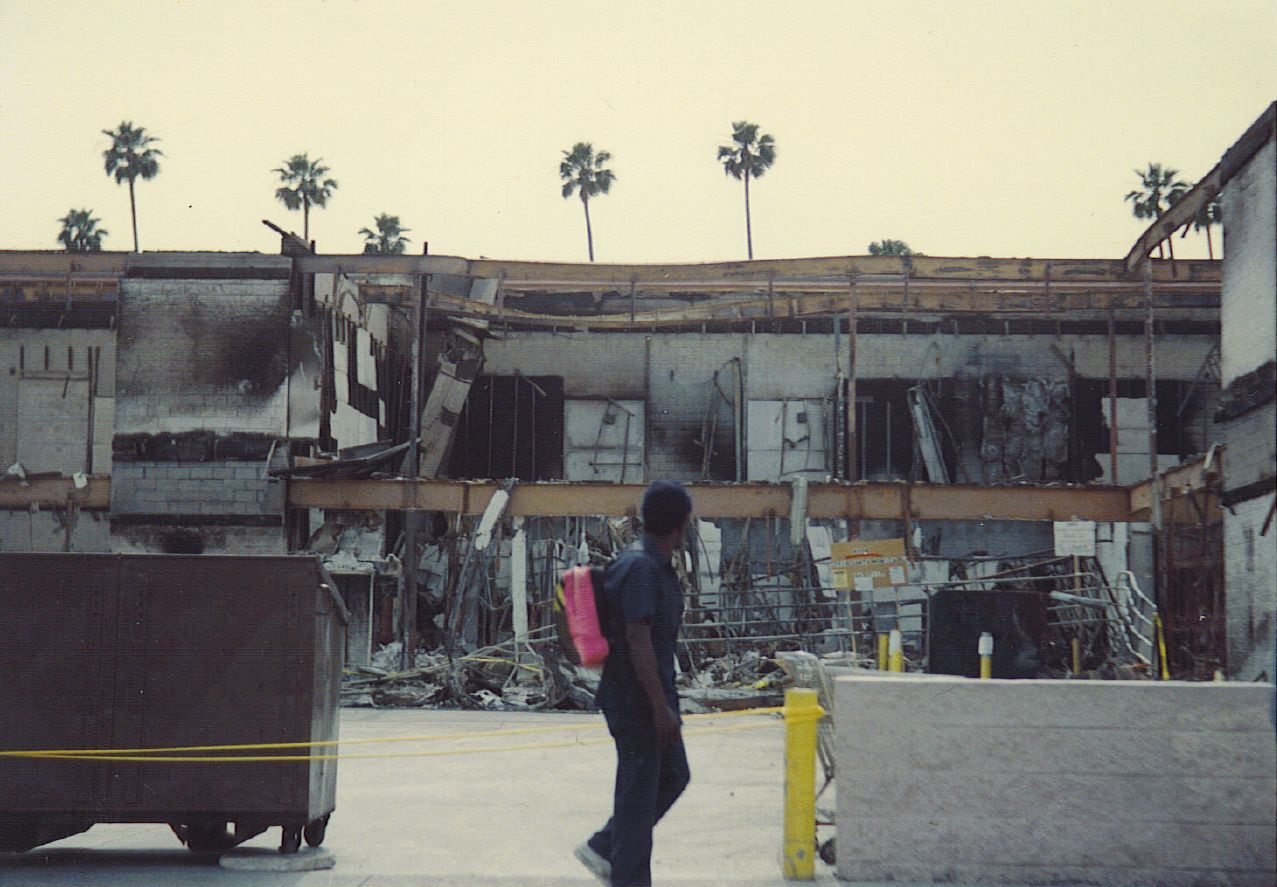
Destroyed buildings in the aftermath of the 1992 Los Angeles riots

On March 3, 1991, Rodney King, an unarmed Black man, was pulled over in Lake View Terrace by the LAPD for speeding on a highway. Without provocation, he was severely beaten by a group of police officers, which was recorded by an onlooker. On April 12, 1992, when an all-White jury found the officers not guilty of the beating, some Black people in L.A. rioted. They came into conflict with local Korean business-owners, motivated by the 1991 killing of Latasha Harlins, a Black teenager, by a Korean shopkeeper for supposedly stealing orange juice. The National Guard was brought in to quell the riots. More than 50 people were killed and there was $1 billion of property damage.

On January 17, 1994, Los Angeles was hit with a 6.7 magnitude earthquake centered on Northridge. The earthquake killed 53 people and caused $20 billion in damage, the costliest earthquake in American history. It promoted research of potential earthquakes in the area and new developments in the city became required to incorporate earthquake-proofing features.

In 1994, O.J. Simpson, a Black celebrity actor and former football player, was arrested in Los Angeles for the murder of his wife Nicole Brown Simpson and her waiter Ron Goldman, both White. The arrest came after a televised incident in which he tried to flee from the police in his friend's van on a Los Angeles highway. His criminal trial for murder exacerbated racial tensions before he was ultimately found not guilty. He was later found guilty of the murders in a civil trial.

In 1995, the Rampart scandal unfolded over criminal misconduct by 70 officers of the LAPD. It started reforms within the department.

The 1995 murder of Stephanie Kuhen in Los Angeles led to condemnation from President Bill Clinton and a crackdown on Los Angeles-area gangs.

== 21st century ==
=== 2000s ===
By the end of the 20th century, some of the annexed areas began to feel cut off from the political process of the megalopolis, leading to a particularly strong secession movement in the San Fernando Valley and weaker ones in San Pedro and Hollywood. The referendums to split the city were rejected by voters in November 2002.

James Hahn was elected mayor in 2001.

Antonio Villaraigosa was elected mayor in 2005.

In 2007, Hollywood writers went on strike over lack of pay, because they claimed they were not making appropriate amounts of money from DVD sales, which by that point had become a major source of revenue for the studios. TV and film production shut down, having widespread effects on the industry. Negotiation led to wins for the writers, but it was ultimately unsustainable, as writers went on strike again in 2023.

=== 2010s ===
Eric Garcetti was elected mayor in 2013.

On September 13, 2017, the International Olympic Committee elected Los Angeles as the host city for the 2028 Summer Olympics. Following the election of Los Angeles, the region began to undertake a series of mass transit improvements known as the Twenty-eight by '28 plan in order to make the city "car-free" by 2028. Progress was made with the expansion of subway, light rail, and bus rapid transit. By late 2024, the promise to be "car-free" was seen as an unfeasible goal as other transportation projects will not be completed by 2028. Other transit improvements beyond 2028 include the Sepulveda Transit Corridor project and the K Line Northern Extension.

In 2018, much of northwestern L.A. was damaged by the Woolsey Fire. Many people died or had their homes destroyed. The fire was caused by the criminal negligence of Southern California Edison, who made a $360 million settlement with the victims in 2019.

=== 2020s ===
On January 25, 2020, 9 people died when a helicopter crashed into the hills of Calabasas during cloudy weather. This included Kobe Bryant, a player for the Lakers who is considered to be one of the best players in the NBA's history. His death was very shocking to Angelenos, and thousands showed up to his funeral at Staples Center.

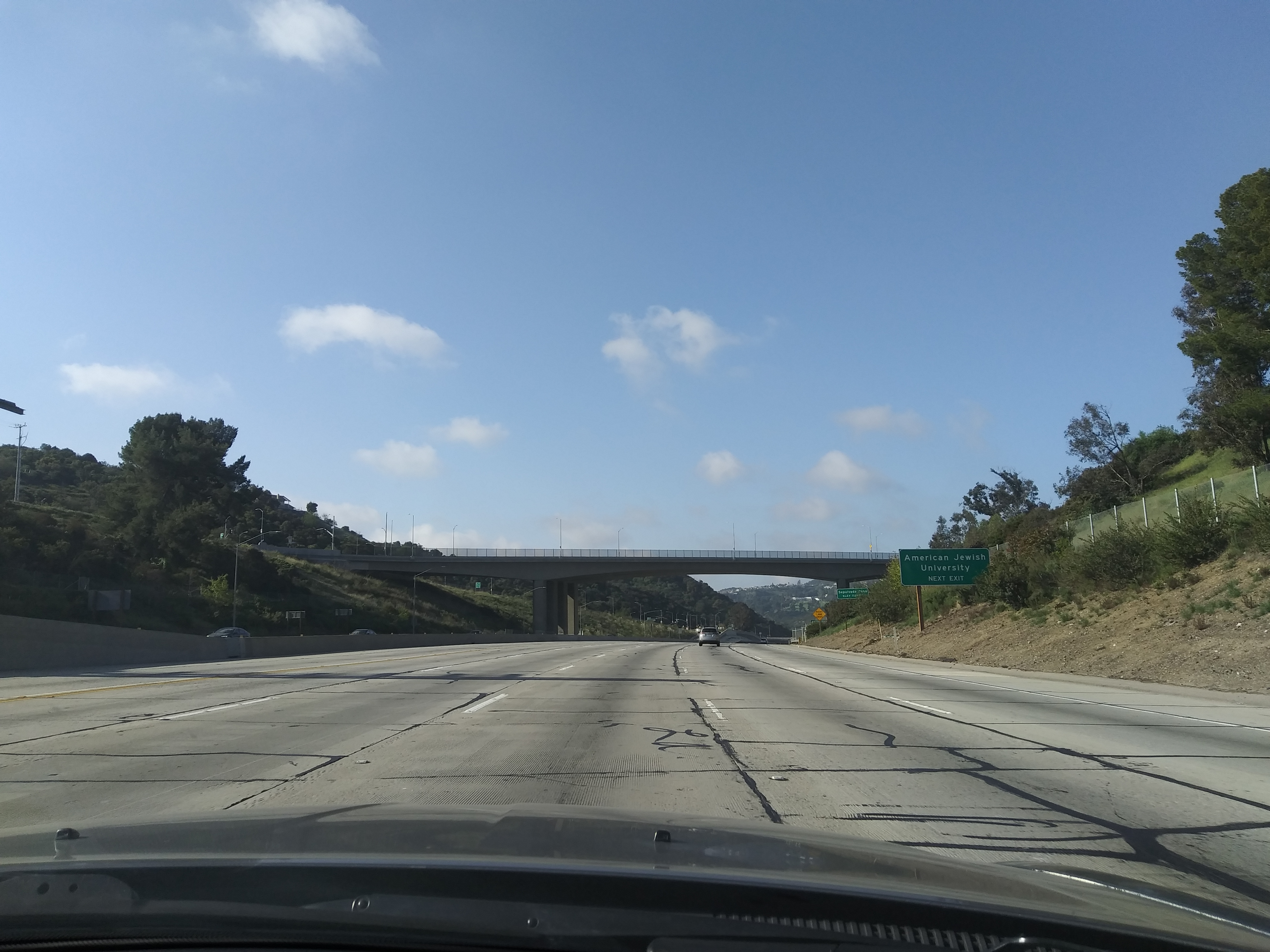
The 405 Freeway mostly empty in March 2020, due to quarantining during the COVID-19 pandemic

The COVID-19 pandemic started in Los Angeles in 2020. The first death from COVID in L.A. County was reported on March 11, 2020. Over the next few weeks, much of the city shut down, including businesses, schools, and parks. On March 20, Eric Garcetti ordered a stay-at-home order. Some of these restrictions lasted until the end of the year, or were reinstated when a new surge of COVID started in November 2020.

During the summer of 2020, L.A. also experienced mass protests of the Black Lives Matter movement as a part of the nationwide protests over police brutality, brought on by the killing of unarmed Black man George Floyd in Minnesota. L.A. had some rioting during this time, as protesters fought with the LAPD.

In January 2021, L.A. County became the nation's leading hotspot for COVID-19, being the nation's first county to receive 1 million cases of the disease since the start of the pandemic; NBC News reported on January 14, 2021, that one person in L.A. County died from the disease every 6 minutes. For the next few years, COVID surged every summer in the city. During the pandemic, there was an increase of crime within L.A. While crime went down over the next few years, L.A. experienced a homelessness crisis, as many public parks became occupied by homeless camps. The city also created a task force to prevent homeless people from receiving COVID-19.

Karen Bass was elected mayor in 2022. During her term, scrutiny was given toward criminal gangs made up of acting deputies of the L.A. County Sheriff's Department. Many criminal charges were filed towards the officers.

In 2023, Hollywood writers went on strike again, partially because of the fear of artificial intelligence—which had made significant advances in the past few years—taking the place of writers. Hollywood production was again shut down, and the writers achieved some of their goals as exploitation of A.I. was curbed, but the question of A.I.'s use in other fields of filmmaking was left open.

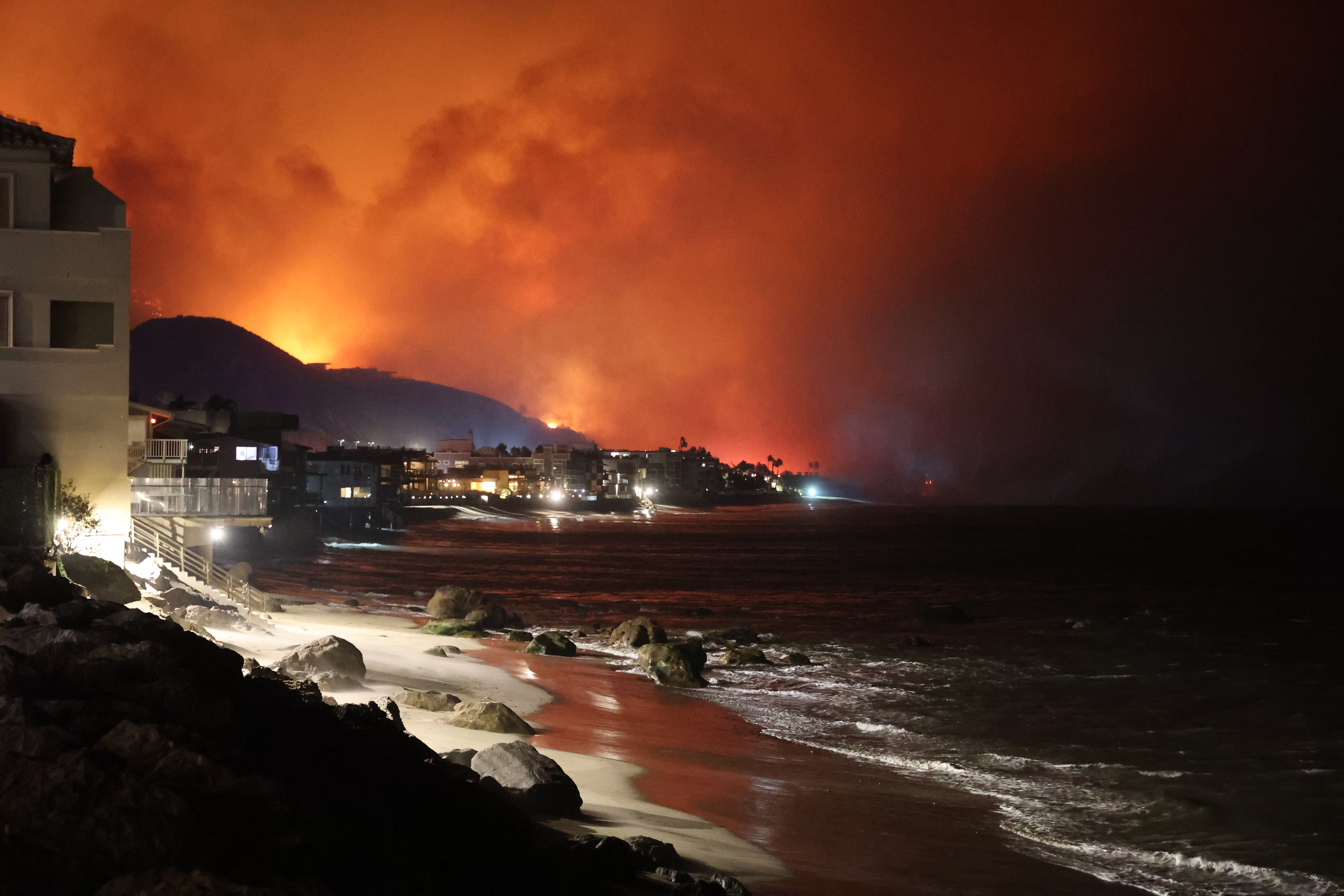
The Palisades Fire viewed from the shoreline on January 8, 2025

From January 7 to January 31, 2025, the series of wildfires affected the Los Angeles metropolitan area and surrounding regions. The fires, which include the Palisades Fire, Eaton Fire, Hurst Fire, and Sunset Fire, were exacerbated by very low humidity, dry conditions, and hurricane-force Santa Ana winds that in some places exceeded 80 miles per hour (130 km/h). As of April 3, the wildfires have resulted in 30 deaths, destroyed or damaged more than 5,000 structures, and forced more than 137,000 people to evacuate. Insured losses were expected to exceed $20 billion, a new record for wildfire-related insurance claims in US history.

In June 2025, Los Angeles experienced a series of protests, which were followed by the deployment of federal forces.

== Population history ==
The population of Los Angeles reached more than 100,000 with the 1900 census, more than a million in 1930, more than two million in 1960, and more than 3 million in 1990. Los Angeles surpassed Chicago to become the nation's second largest city between 1980 and 1982, with a population estimated to be 3.022 million in 1982.

The population of Los Angeles in 2020 was 3,898,747.

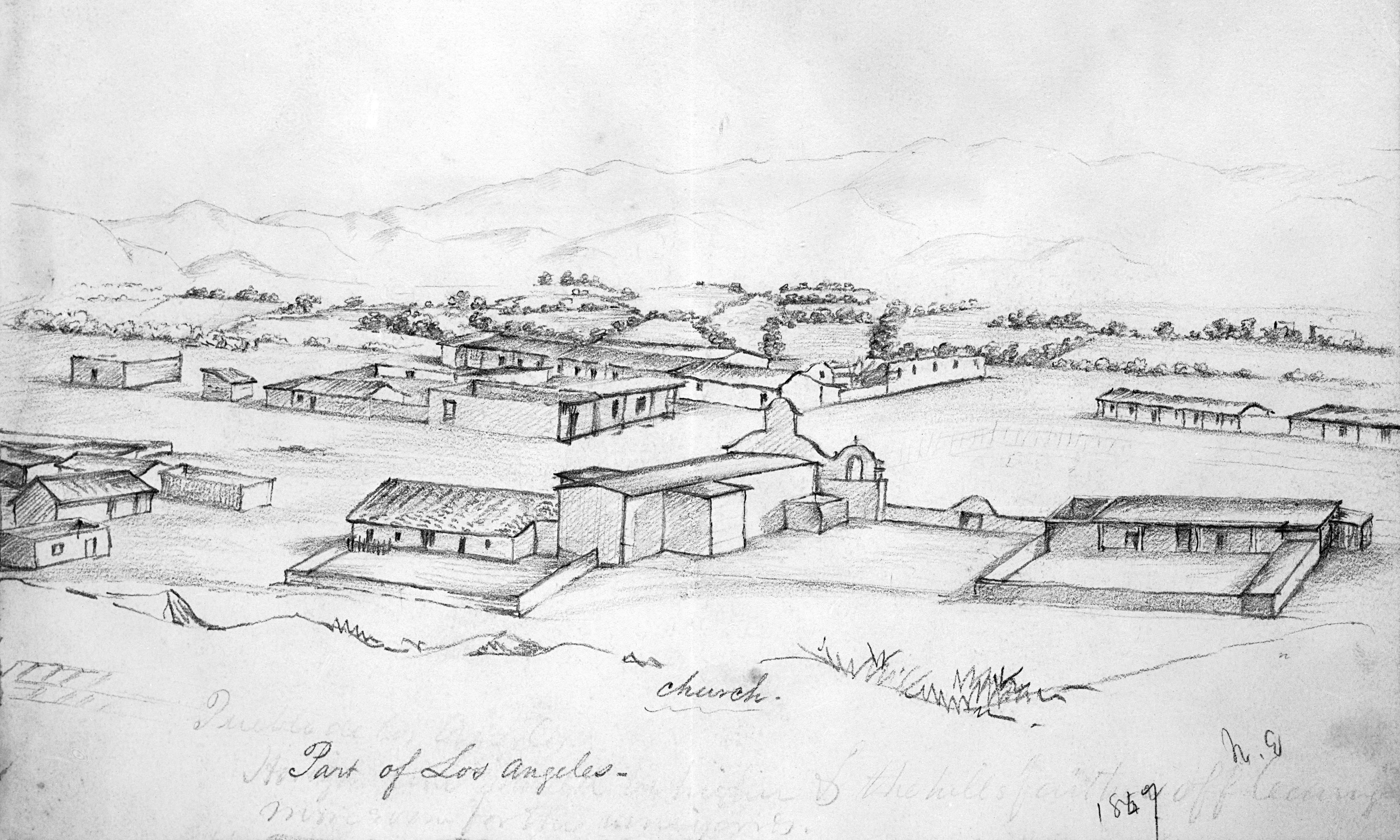
Los Angeles c. 1847

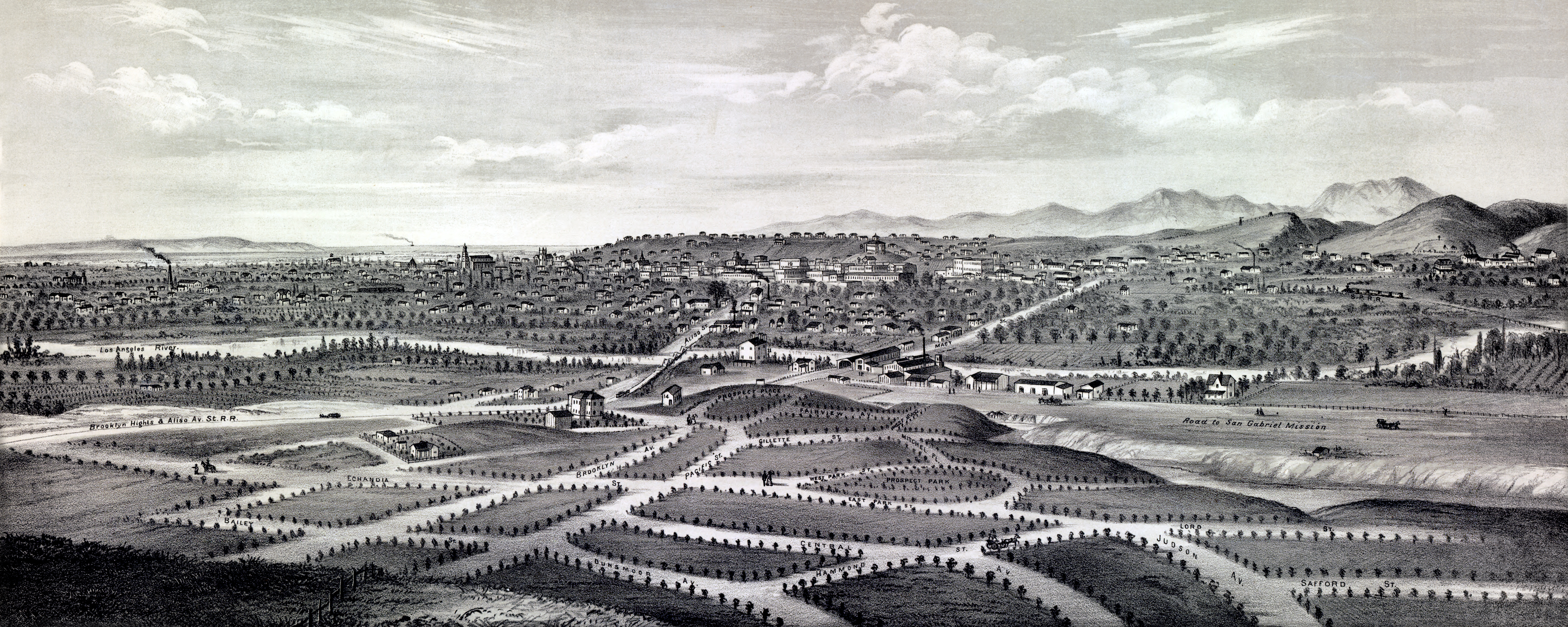
Los Angeles in 1877

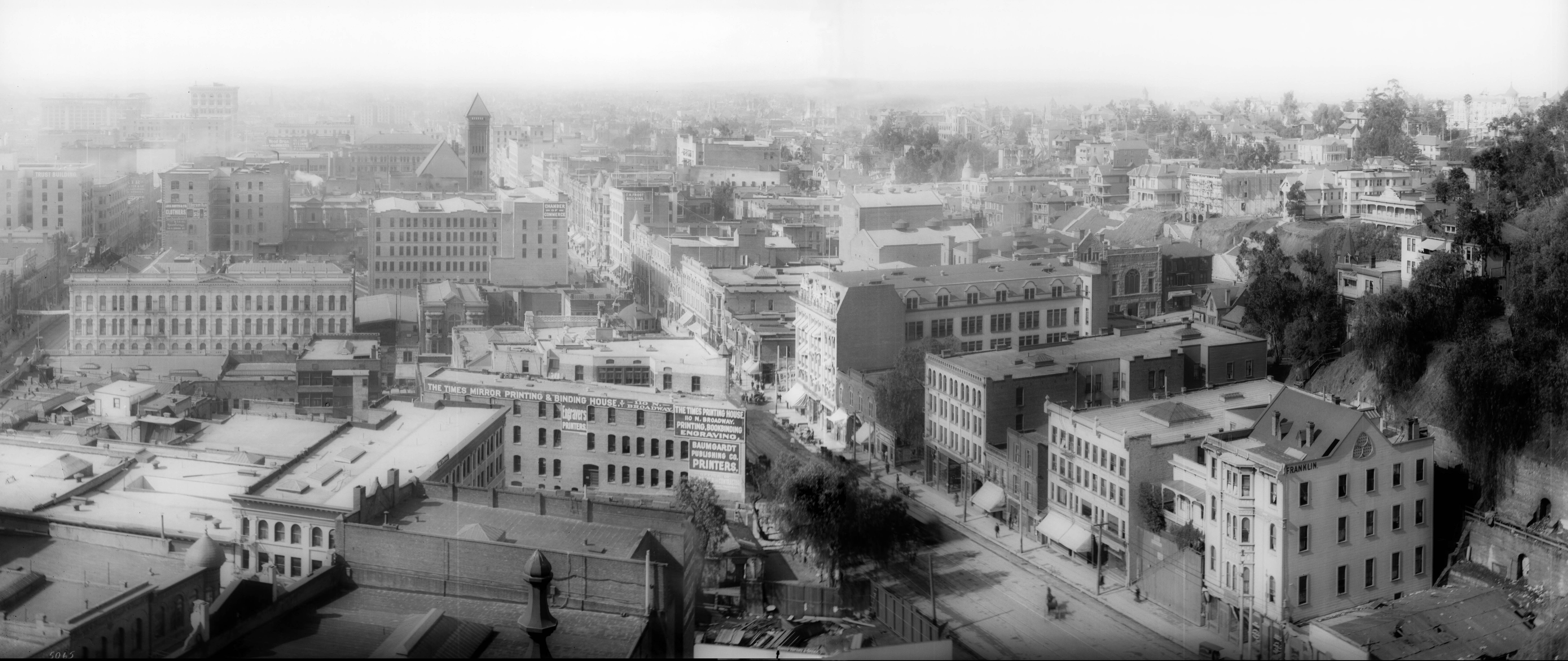
Los Angeles in 1905

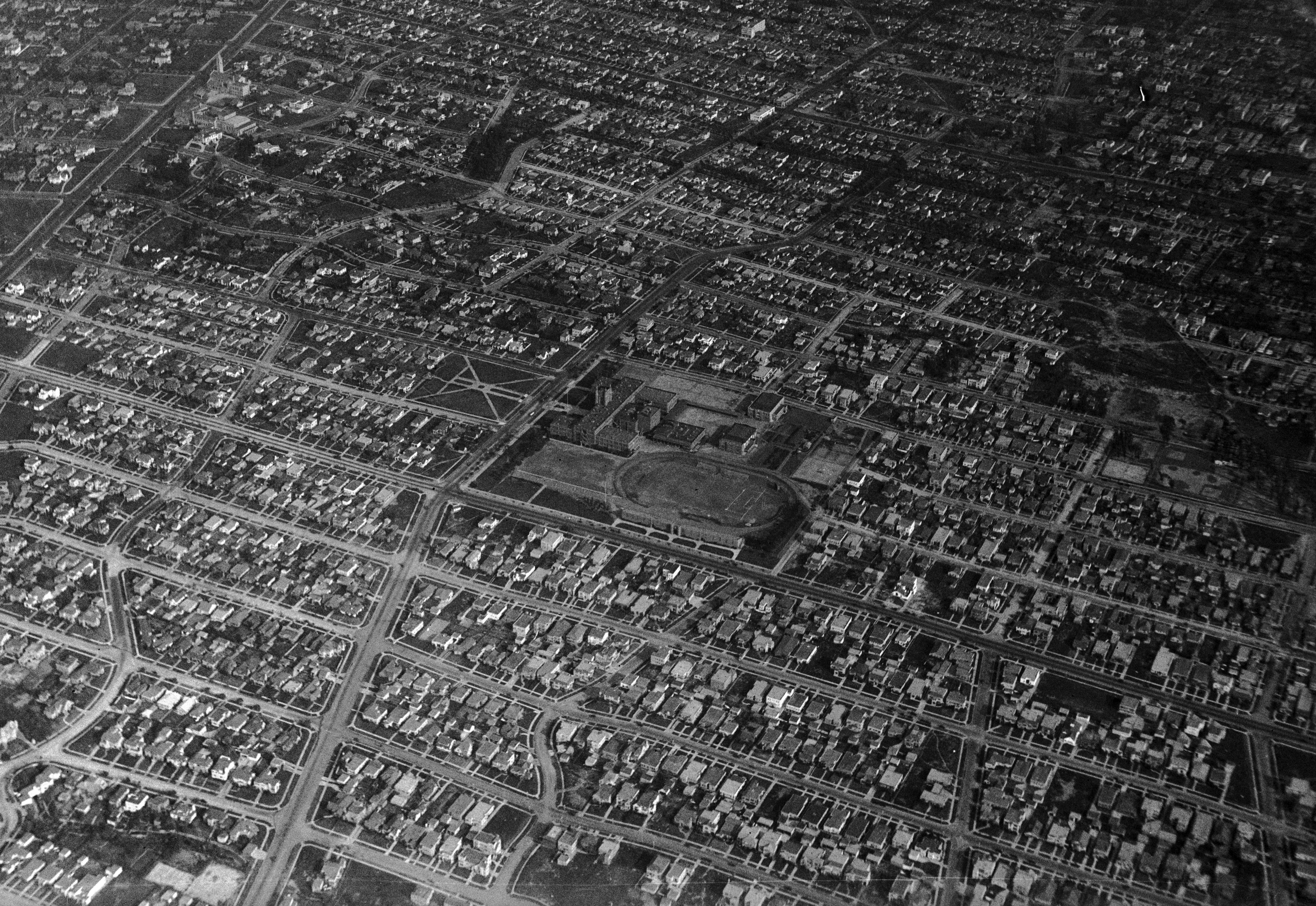
Los Angeles c. 1930

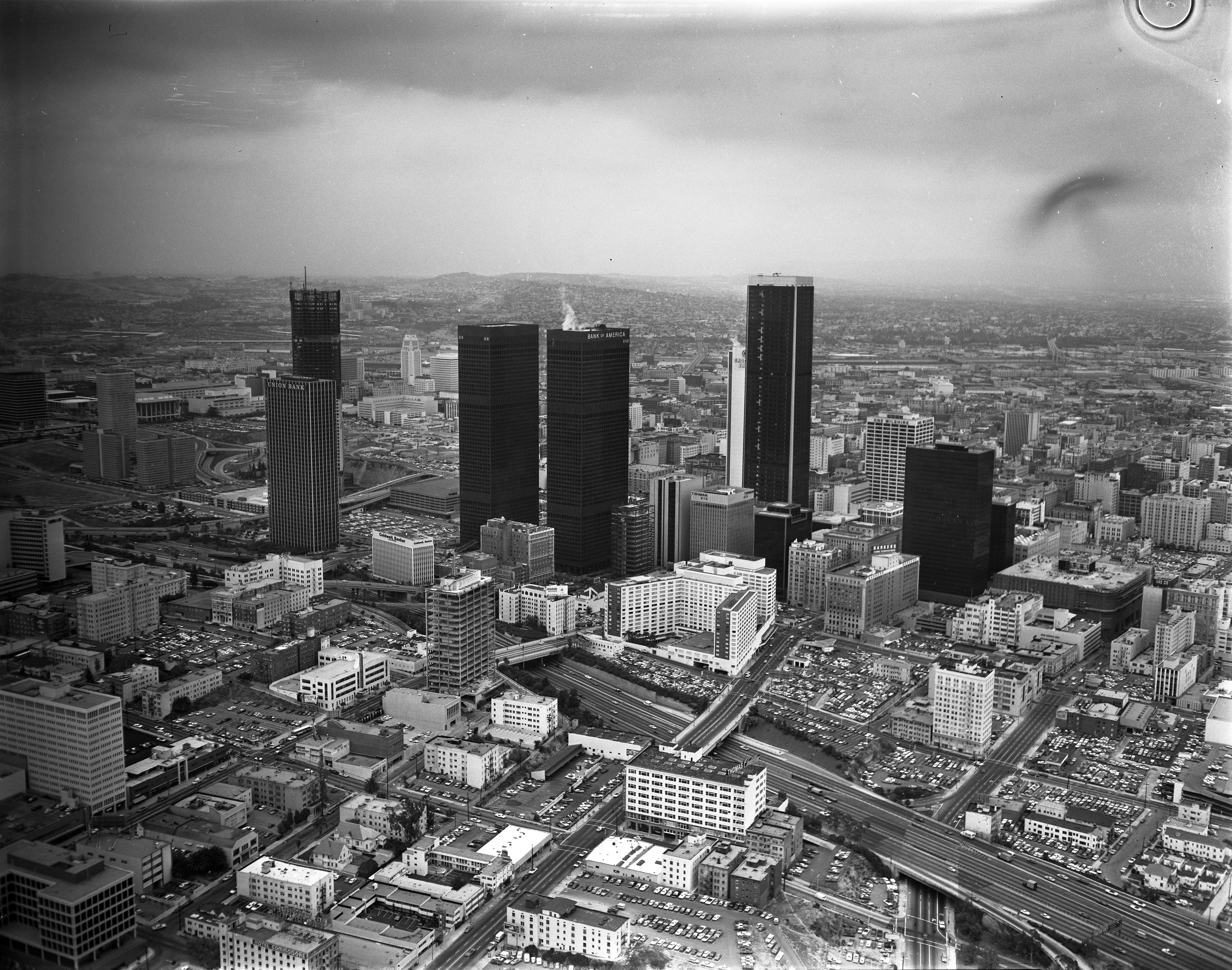
Los Angeles in 1973

Year	Population	Growth
1790	131	—
1800	315	184
1810	365	50
1820	650	285
1830	1,300	650
1840	2,240	940
1850	—	—
1860	4,385	—
1870	5,730	1,345
1880	11,200	5,470
1890	50,400	39,200
1900	102,500	52,100
1910	319,200	216,700
1920	576,700	257,500
1930	1,238,048	661,348
1940	1,504,277	266,229
1950	1,970,358	466,081
1960	2,479,015	508,657
1970	2,816,061	337,046
1980	2,966,850	150,789
1990	3,485,398	518,548
2000	3,694,820	209,422
2010	3,792,621	97,801
2020	3,898,747	106,126

Sources: Historical Census Populations of Counties and Incorporated Cities in California, 1850–2010; Historical Resident Population of Los Angeles during the Spanish & Mexican Period, 1781 to 1840

== See also ==
- Bibliography of California history
- Bibliography of Los Angeles
- Timeline of Los Angeles
- History of African Americans in Los Angeles
- History of Native Americans in Los Angeles
- History of the Jews in Los Angeles
- History of Mexican Americans in Los Angeles
- History of Chinese Americans in Los Angeles
- History of Armenian Americans in Los Angeles
- History of Iranian Americans in Los Angeles
- Outline of the history of Los Angeles

Other articles which contain relevant history sections.

- History of Southern California freeways
- Los Angeles Times
- History of the Los Angeles Police Department
- Los Angeles Fire Department History
- History of the San Fernando Valley to 1915
- History of Beverly Hills
- History of Inglewood
- History of Culver City
- History of Compton

Articles on specific events in Los Angeles history

- Battle of Los Angeles
- California Water Wars

== Bibliography ==
- Davis, Margaret Leslie. Dark side of fortune : triumph and scandal in the life of oil tycoon Edward L. Doheny (1998) online
- Chisholm, Hugh, ed. (1911). "Los Angeles" . Encyclopædia Britannica. Vol. 17 (11th ed.). Cambridge University Press. pp. 12–14.
- Holli, Melvin G., and Jones, Peter d'A., eds. Biographical Dictionary of American Mayors, 1820-1980 (Greenwood Press, 1981) short scholarly biographies each of the city's mayors 1820 to 1980. online; see index at p. 409 for list.
- Hart, James D. A Companion to California (2nd ed. U of California Press, 1987), 610pp; excellent encyclopedic coverage of 3000 topics; not online.
- Longstreth, Richard. The Drive-In, the Supermarket, and the Transformation of Commercial Space in Los Angeles, 1914–1941 (MIT Press, 1999)
- Lotchin, Roger W. ed. The Way We Really Were: The Golden State in the Second Great War (University of Illinois Press, 2000), essays by experts.
- Pitt, Leonard. Los Angeles A to Z: An Encyclopedia of the City and County. (University of California Press, 1997) 625pp; excellent encyclopedic coverage of 2000 topics; not online.
- Rolle, Andrew, and Arthur C. Verge. California: A history (John Wiley & Sons, 2014).
- Schiesl, Martin J. "Progressive Reform in Los Angeles under Mayor Alexander, 1909-1913." California Historical Quarterly 54.1 (1975): 37–56. JSTOR 25157543
- Some of the best cultural history appears in the appropriate chapters of the multi-volume History of California by Kevin Starr, including
  - Americans and the California Dream, 1850–1915 (1973) ISBN 978-0-19501-644-4
  - Inventing the Dream: California through the Progressive Era (1985) ISBN 0-19-503489-9
  - Material Dreams: Southern California through the 1920s (1990) ISBN 0-19-504487-8
- Verge, Arthur C. "The impact of the Second World War on Los Angeles: 1939-1945" (PhD dissertation, University of Southern California; ProQuest Dissertations & Theses, 1988. DP28798).
- Verge, Arthur C. "The Impact of the Second World War on Los Angeles." Pacific Historical Review 63.3 (1994): 289–314. online
