= Earl E. Kynette =

American police officer (1893–1970)

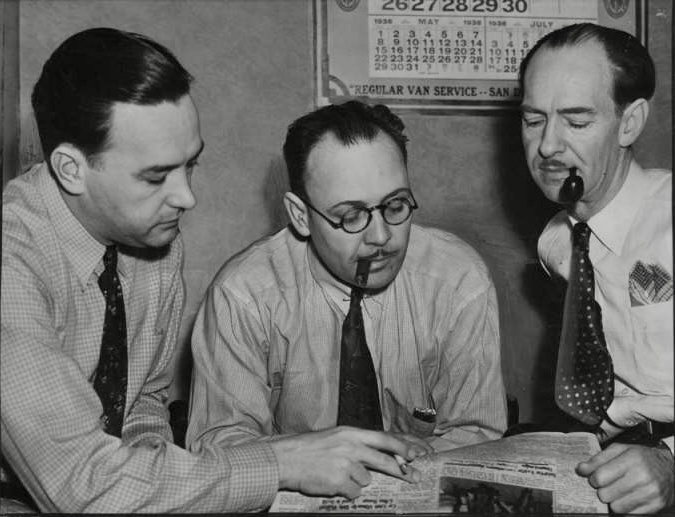
- "Left to right, Roy Allen, who was convicted of the malicious use of explosives; Captain Kynette, who was convicted of attempted murder, assault with intent to commit murder, and malicious use of explosives; and Fred Browne, (Note: Browne died of a heart attack in February 1939.) acquitted of all charges" (L.A. Herald-Examiner photo collection via Los Angeles Public Library)
- Born: June 18, 1893; Council Bluffs, Iowa, United States
- Died: June 3, 1970 (aged 76); Los Angeles, California, United States
- Occupations: Pharmacist, police officer

Earl Eugene Kynette (Note: Earl is sometimes spelled Earle. This may be a variant spelling and/or an erroneous conflation of his first name and middle initial.) (June 18, 1893 – June 3, 1970) was an American pharmacist and municipal police officer. He served on the vice squad and the intelligence squad of the city of Los Angeles, California police department. Kynette allegedly had close ties to the local crime syndicate, and allegedly had been a pimp associated with bootlegger Albert Marco. In 1938, Kynette was charged with conspiracy in a car-bomb attack on Harry J. Raymond, a private investigator in the employ of local anti-corruption crusaders. Kynette was convicted and sentenced to two years to life in prison. After he was paroled, he killed two people while driving drunk on a mountain highway in Tuolumne County, California. Kynette died of natural causes in Los Angeles in 1970.

== Career ==
Described in the influential Liberty magazine series "The Lid Off Los Angeles" as "a dough-faced, weak-eyed egomaniac with an army and medical background and considerable intelligence," Kynette was a native of Council Bluffs, Iowa who graduated from the University of Southern California. He worked as a pharmacist and a hotel manager before entering the Los Angeles Police Academy, from which he graduated around November 1925. Pharmacist may have been, in part, a cover for "bootlegger," as pharmacies were permitted to dispense alcohol medicinally during Prohibition, which meant drugstores often became centers for illicit production and distribution of intoxicants. Similarly, "hotel manager" was most likely a euphemism for brothel keeper, as according to Daily News staffer Jack Strange in 1952, "Kynette was a pharmacist by occupation and once had managed a drug store on East Fifth street. He was a pimp by avocation and at one time had had a couple of girls working in [Alberto] Marco's houses. Marco, impressed by the young man's ambition, intelligence and boldness, had used his influence with the Syndicate to get Kynette on the Police department. Kynette was assigned to work on prostitutes, not those of course who had protection by working in Marco's houses".

Within 18 months of joining the force, he was a sergeant, working on raiding "blind pigs" (illegal Prohibition-era drinking and gambling establishments). According to Strange in the Daily News, "In 1925 Sgt. Sidney Sweetnam, old-time vice squad officer who had worked with Guy McAfee when that worthy was a vice squad cop, arrested Kynette for shaking down a prostitute on West Sixth street. He booked him for bribery and extortion. The next day, however, the chief of police kicked Kynette out of jail and suppressed the charges, later promoting him to a sergeancy."

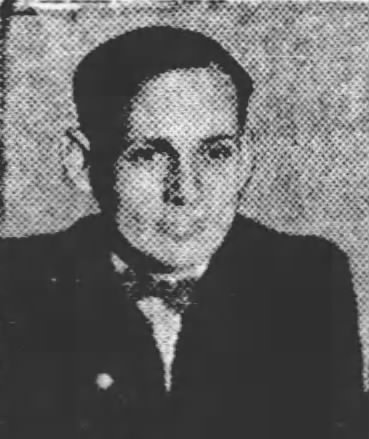
Kynette at the police academy in 1925

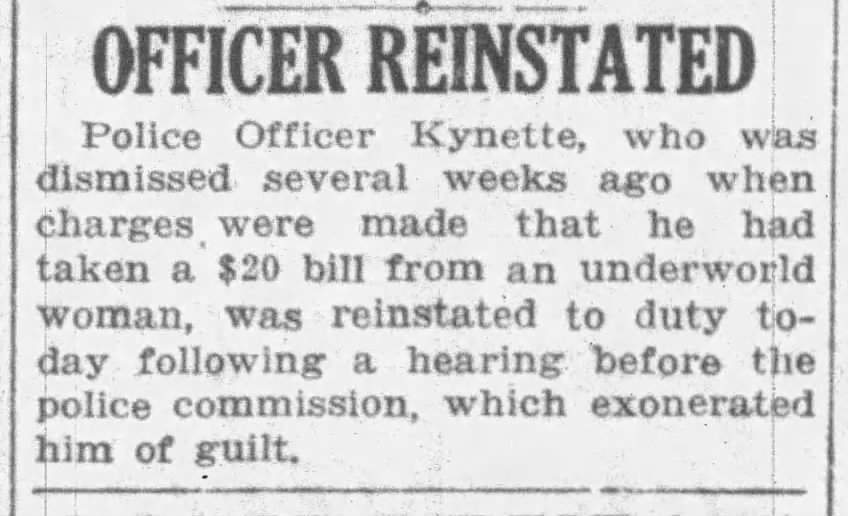
"Officer Reinstated" Los Angeles Evening Post-Record, December 14, 1927

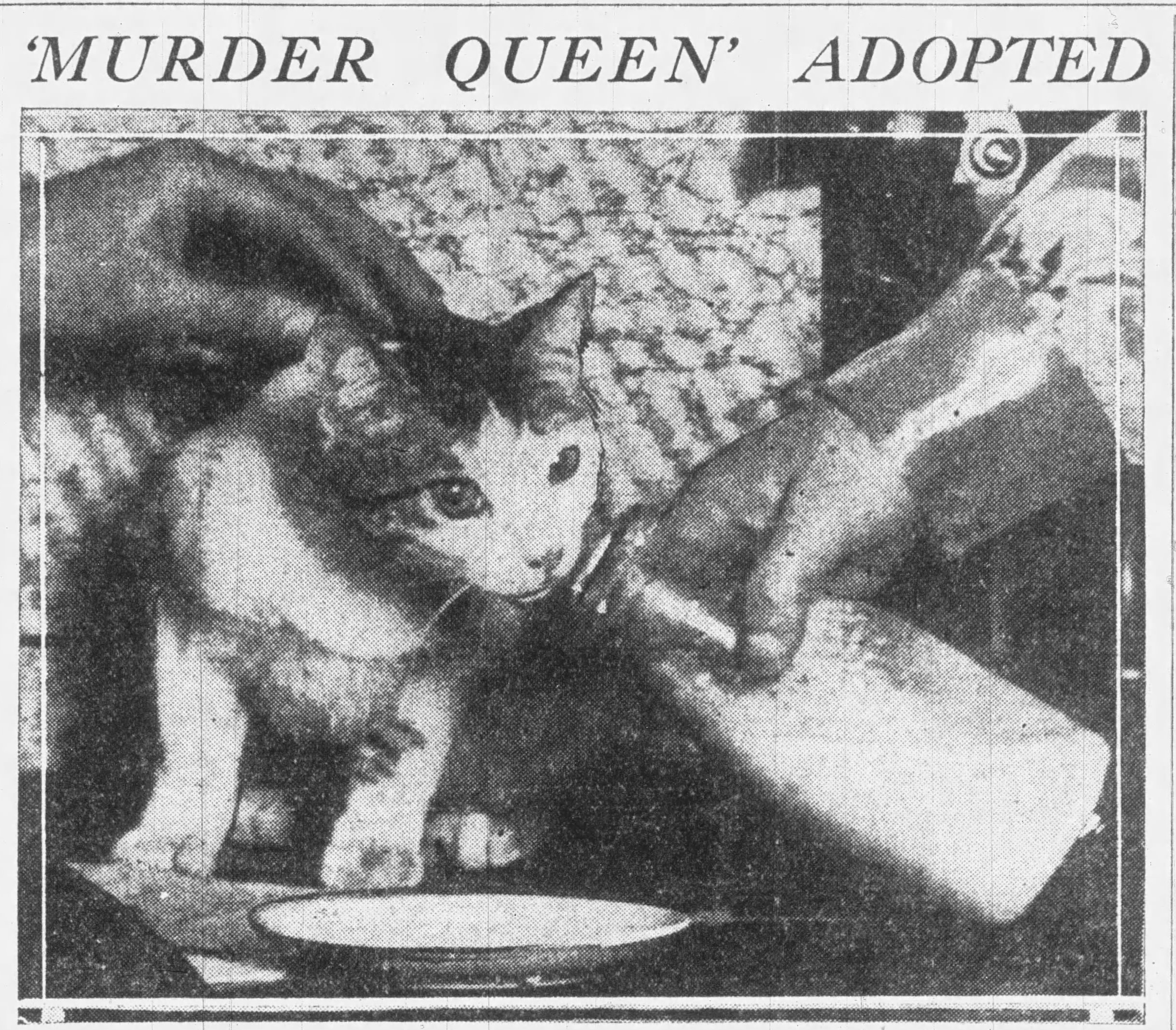
In 1929 the LAPD homicide squad adopted a stray cat; Kynette named her Madame Pompadour

Kynette was first fired from the LAPD in 1927, after being charged with taking a bribe, but was rehired a few weeks later. After reinstatement he worked in Wilmington in the Harbor area for about three months before being transferred to the detective bureau downtown. In 1929 the downtown homicide bureau adopted a stray tabby cat; Kynette named her Madame Pompadour. When Albert Marco was put on trial in 1928 for shooting two people one summer night at the Ship Cafe in Venice, the defense called Kynette as a character witness; he testified that "the defendant is a peaceful man".

By December 1929, Kynette was ranked as a detective lieutenant and was transferred to the Venice bureau. In August 1930, he was "demoted" and transferred to Boyle Heights, likely due to his involvement in the investigation of the murder of Motley Flint; "For Kynette, at the time Frank Keaton shot and killed Motley Flint, prominent banker, was the only officer investigating the case to tell of the discovery of [Rev. Robert] Shuler's vitriolic booklet Julian Thieves found in the murderer's possession. There was much talk at the time of the finding of the booklet that it might have been a contributing factor in Keaton's desire to murder the banker. Kynette was subjected to much criticism by friends of the broadcasting pastor for telling newspaper men that Keaton had the booklet. Other officers lied deliberately or evaded questions of reporters about the pamphlet. No reason was given for Kynette's transfer. He was simply ordered to report in uniform Monday morning at the east side station." Julian Thieves in Politics was one of Rev. Shuler's multiplatform sermons publicizing the Julian Petroleum Corporation scandal.

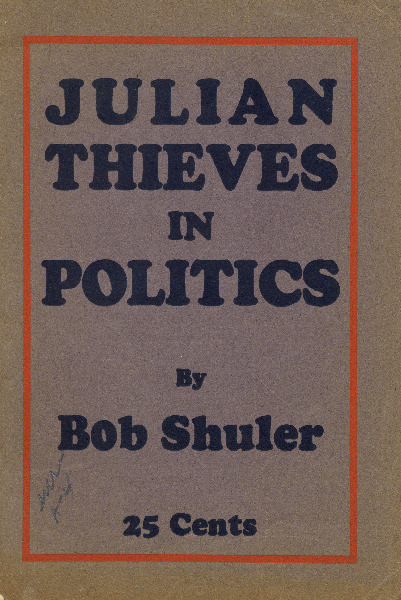
Julian Thieves in Politics by Bob Shuler drew connections between Julian Petroleum Company executives and local politicians (University of Hawaiʻi at Mānoa Digital Collections)

Julian executives defrauded local investors of $100–$200 million (nearly $3 billion in 2019 dollars) with the help of local businessmen and politicians. Grand juries indicted several of those involved, but the slow pace of the prosecutions led the Supreme Court of California to dismiss the charges en masse for failure to provide a speedy trial...Shuler blamed both the District Attorney of Los Angeles County, Asa Keyes, and Los Angeles City Prosecutor Lloyd Nix for the failure, implying on air that Keyes was in the pocket of the indicted businessmen and that Nix was negligent. Shuler's broadcast attacks forced Keyes to resign; the disgraced former district attorney would indeed later be convicted of taking a bribe from a Julian executive. Nix, also forced to resign, would eventually extract a measure of revenge on Shuler, but not before the imbroglio peaked with the killing of one of the indicted businessmen by a defrauded investor who carried a printed copy of one of Shuler's broadcasts in his pocket bearing the title Julian Thieves in Politics. Nix claimed during an interview on another radio station that Shuler had as good as pulled the trigger by inciting public outrage over the acquittals in the first place."

— "Social Media Regulation in the Public Interest: Some Lessons from History" (2020), Knight First Amendment Institute at Columbia University

According to the Los Angeles Evening Post-Record in 1930, describing Kynette and others criticized by Rev. Shuler, Kynette was an expert in poisons and chemicals, and "As we know, Mr. Kynette has obtained the highest rating in the police school ever obtained by any policeman anywhere in the United States. He is a college graduate, an officer of the U.S. Army Reserves, a chemist and a man with a thorough scientific training. Besides that he has plenty of personal initiative and energy. He is the kind of man of whom the modern police executive is made." When James E. Davis was appointed chief of police for the second time, in October 1933, "Kynette joined the chief's office after serving a stint at the Hollenbeck Heights division". In 1935, the editorial page of the Post-Record intimated that Kynette and other members of the LAPD Vice Squad were being favored within the department: "Apparently there is only one sure route to advancement on this police department. The candidate who would succeed in passing civil service examinations cum laude, so to speak, must pass his time in the intellectually more stimulating society of prostitutes, gamblers, hop-heads, small-time politicians, and the like who may be encountered regularly in the routine of a vice squad officer."

A close ally of Chief Davis, Kynette was heavily involved in the department's unconstitutional diversion at the state line of migrants to California ("Okies and Arkies"), an action sometimes known as the Bum Blockade. After the ACLU filed a lawsuit on behalf of John Langan, "a Los Angeles resident...who had been returning from a job in Arizona when the LAPD had stopped him at the border," Langan abruptly withdrew himself from the action, which the ACLU said was because "LAPD lieutenant Earl Kynette pressured him to withdraw" but Langan denied this. Kynette was named captain of detectives in 1936, and assigned to the so-called Spy Squad. Supposedly, he had an especial aptitude for placing dictographs (eavesdropping devices). According to one historian, Kynette's career "was as crassly cavalier and oblivious to individual rights as mayor Frank L. Shaw's career as a public servant." So, if not law enforcement, what was Kynette's real job? Quite unironically, Kynette's role was to defend, rather than attack, vice in L.A. "The Lid Off Los Angeles" put it this way:

This, then, was Los Angeles in the years of Our Lord 1933 to 1937—a fantastic land of golden opportunity in which the underworld raked toward its vest the blue chips of gambling and prostitution while the Mayor's brother, boss of an administration supported by that underworld, figuratively stood on the steps of City Hall auctioning off everything but his own underpants. And if you didn't like it, he had a Spy Squad, headed by Captain Kynette, that would kick your teeth in.

== 1938 Harry Raymond bombing ==
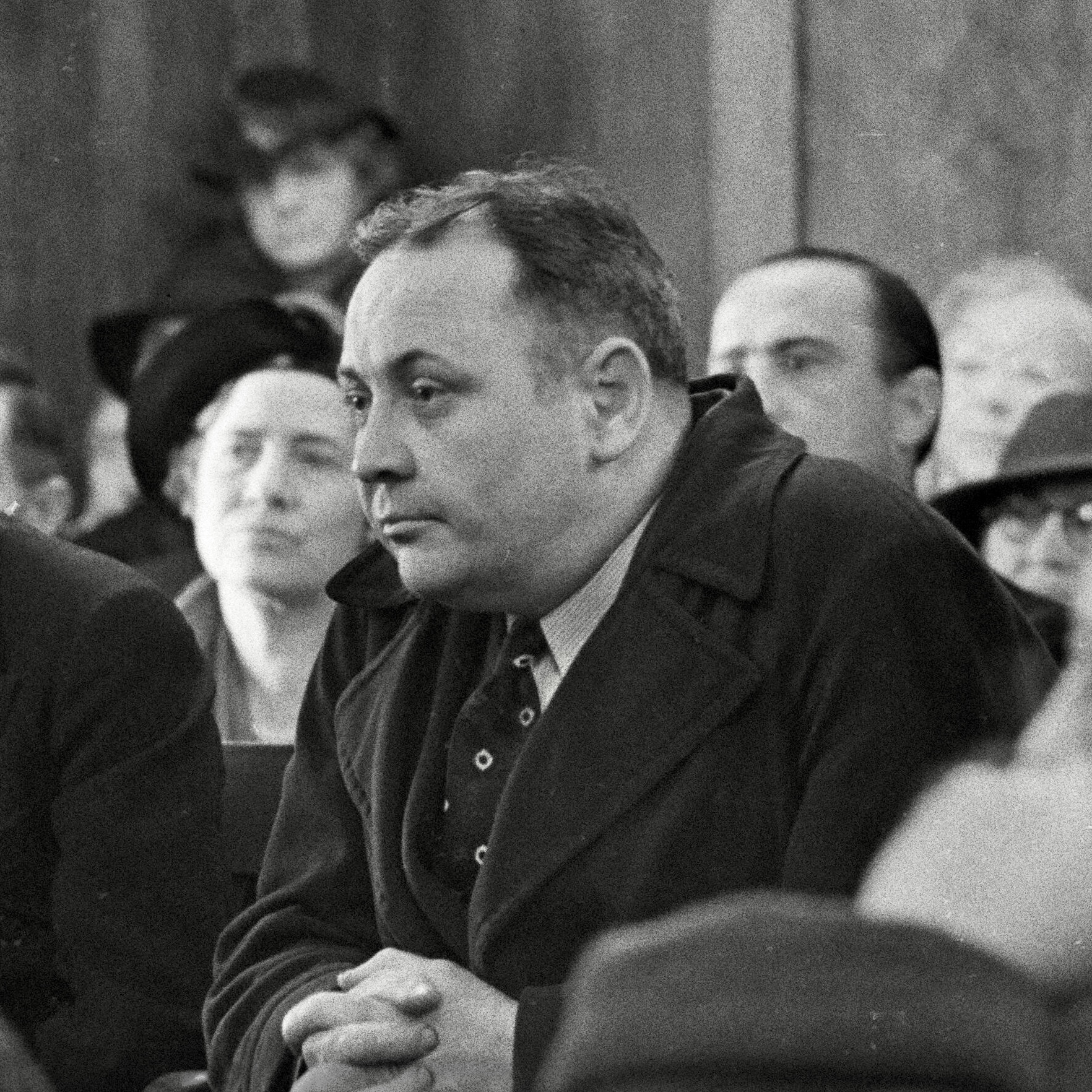
Kynette in court, February 1938 (L.A. Daily News via UCLA Digital Library)

In January 1938, Kynette was charged with conspiracy to commit murder, attempted murder, assault with intent to commit murder, and malicious use of explosives in the bombing attack that maimed a private investigator and former San Diego Chief of Police named Harry Raymond. Raymond worked for a regional anti-corruption group, digging up evidence against the mayor and the police department. The trial was described by Time magazine as "Southern California's biggest political circus" and revealed that the Intelligence Squad was under direct control of the mayor's brother, and had spied on many local dignitaries including John Anson Ford (the mayor's political opponent in the most recent election) and Buron Rogers Fitts (the district attorney trying the case). The scandal led Chief Davis' departure from the police force.

On June 16, 1938, Kynette was found guilty on three of the four counts for the bombing. He was acquitted of conspiracy to commit murder. Also convicted was fellow LAPD officer Roy Allen, albeit he was only found guilty of a single count of malicious use of explosives. A third LAPD officer, Fred Brown, was acquitted.

== Later life ==
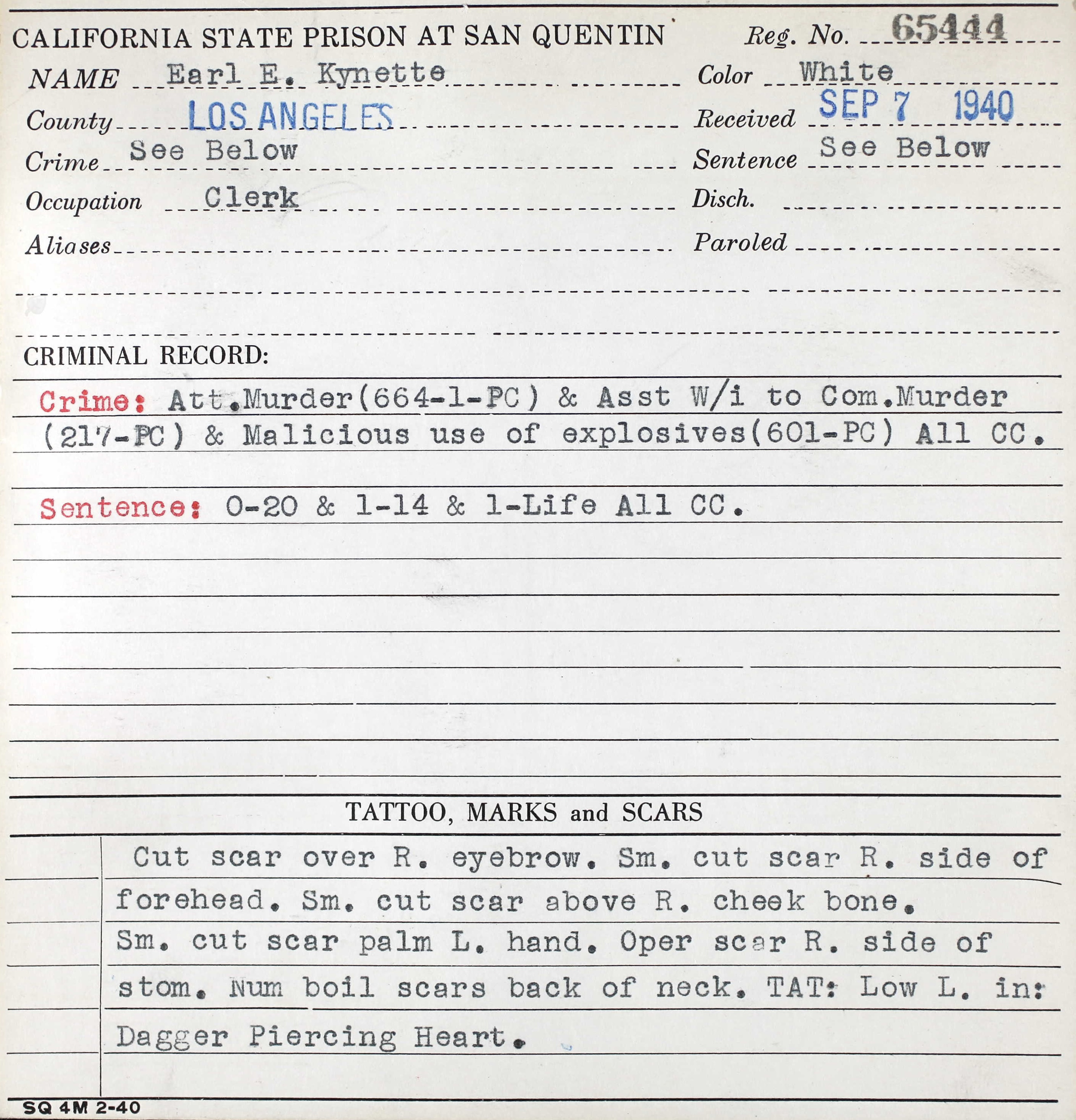
Inmate record for Kynette (prisoner no. 65444) at San Quentin State Prison (California Department of Corrections via Ancestry.com)

In June 1938, Kynette was sentenced to two years to life in prison. Allen was sentenced to one year to life in prison. Both men were sent to San Quentin State Prison. Allen died in the prison hospital on May 17, 1942, at the age of 38.

Against strong opposition from Harry Raymond, Kynette was paroled in December 1945. Following public outcry, he was returned to prison in February 1946. Kynette was paroled again on January 23, 1948, 10 years to the day of the bombing, with the "proviso that he not return to Los Angeles County until 1952". In 1951, Kynette was arrested in the San Francisco Bay Area on a drunkenness charge, and then found to have "an empirin compound and codeine" in his hotel room. As such, he was returned to prison for violating his parole. Kynette was paroled again on April 24, 1952.

At some point, post-prison, Kynette reportedly worked as a pharmacist in Tuolumne County, California. In 1955, he was involved in a motor vehicle accident near the Sonora–Jamestown Highway in which two people were killed. At that time he was described as a "former Twain Harte druggist". There were no witnesses to the accident. Kynette was held in jail from July 1955 to September 1955, when the charges in the case were dismissed for lack of evidence. A civil suit was filed by the family of one of the crash victims, charging that Kynette was driving drunk and was responsible when the car "careened to the top of a 40-foot embankment and dropped down the vertical side to the highway". In the course of the lawsuit, Kynette filed an affidavit stating that he spent the summers of 1959 and 1960 in Missouri receiving "hospital treatment". In 1963, Kynette was stabbed in the abdomen and left arm, apparently by a drinking companion, in the man's "skid row rooms after a night of wine drinking in skid row bars". Earl Kynette died of natural causes in a convalescent home in Los Angeles County.

== See also ==
- 1938 Los Angeles mayoral recall election
- Luke Lane
