= Albert Marco =

California bootlegger and pimp

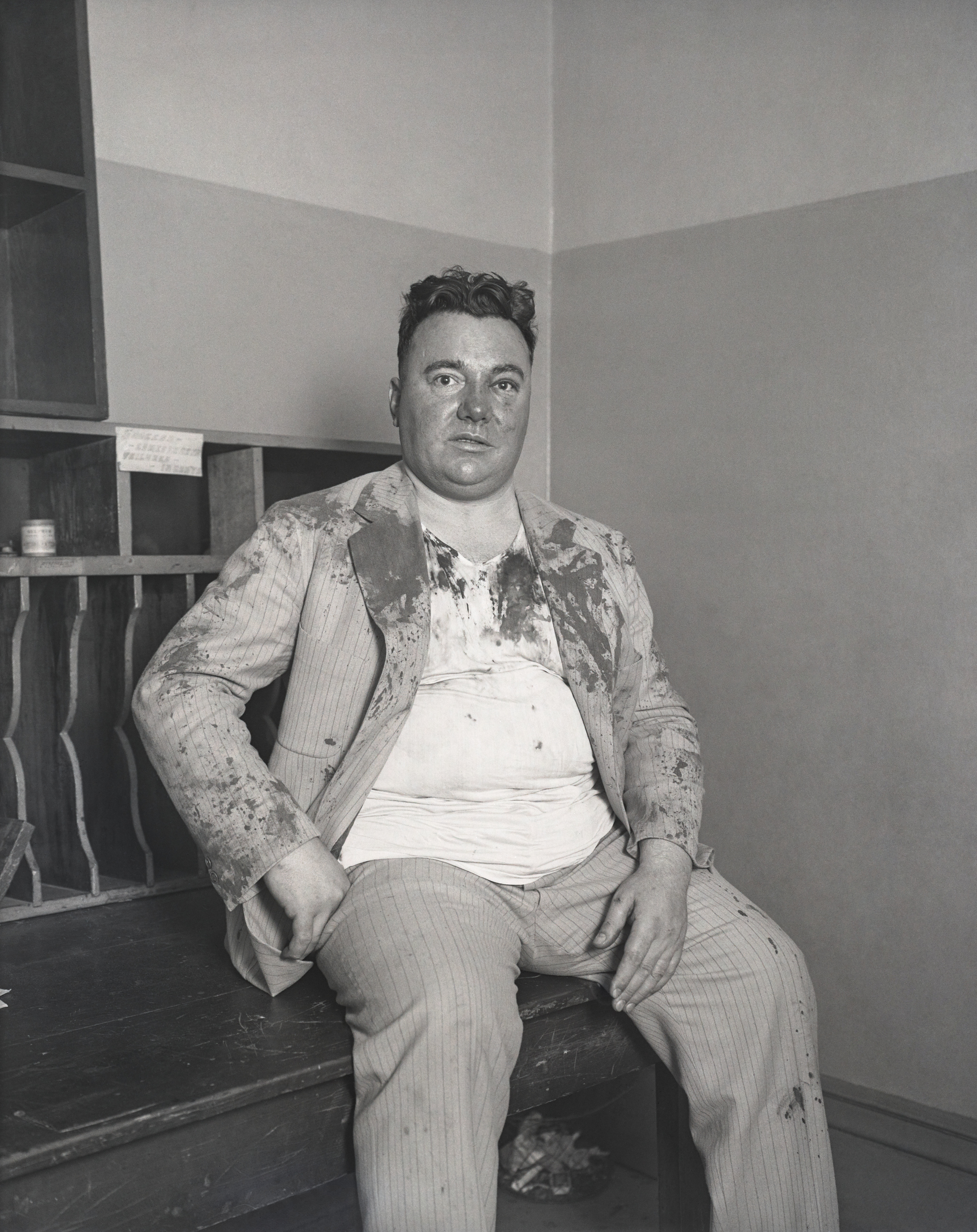
- Marco, covered in blood, in 1928
- Born: Marco Albori c. 1887; Italy
- Died: 1954; Chino, California
- Other names: Alberto Marco, Albert Black

Marco Albori, better known by his alias Albert Marco, was an Italian-born bootlegger and pimp who was active in Los Angeles, California, United States, during the Prohibition Era in the 1920s. He is said to be the first to transport Canadian whiskey to Los Angeles. Marco worked closely with Charles H. Crawford, who ran city politics along with Kent Kane Parrot.

== Career ==
Marco was born about 1887 in Italy. He started off as a pimp and con man in Nevada and Washington. According to one account, Albori came from "the Tyrol mountains on the border of Austria and Italy," emigrating around 1910 and landing in Seattle, where he found work in "swindling" with "procuring and pimping as a sideline". In 1919 he served a brief prison sentence for burglary in Sacramento. Charles H. Crawford, an old friend from their days in Seattle, convinced Marco to move to Los Angeles. Marco came down to Southern California with another pimp, Augustus Sasso, commonly known as Chito. In contrast with his patron Crawford and his partner Chito, "Marco bumbled his way into the newspapers and onto the public scene several times before his 1928 arrest, trial, and subsequent incarceration on two counts of assault, with a deadly weapon". In the early 1920s Marco drove a Cadillac full of illegal alcohol to a warehouse in Long Beach, California. The political connections created by Crawford's political machine let Marco operate without much fear of prosecution for his crimes. In 1925 Marco pistol whipped a Los Angeles Police Department officer and was given a $50 fine and his gun back. He was also associated with Max "Boo Boo" Hoff of Philadelphia.

Marco and Chito ultimately ran a couple dozen whorehouses "scattered through the downtown district and along the edges" staffed by "about 200 prostitutes". According to the U.S. Internal Revenue Service, between 1922 and 1924 Marco earned $500,000 from bordello prostitution. Another indication of Marco's income from running liquor and prostitutes is the claim that "Marco, minus any talent for it, loved to gamble. While he was the Caliph of the Los Angeles heterae, he lost $260,000 one night in 1927 playing low ball in an apartment at the top of Angels Flight" against Nick the Greek.

== Ship Cafe shooting ==
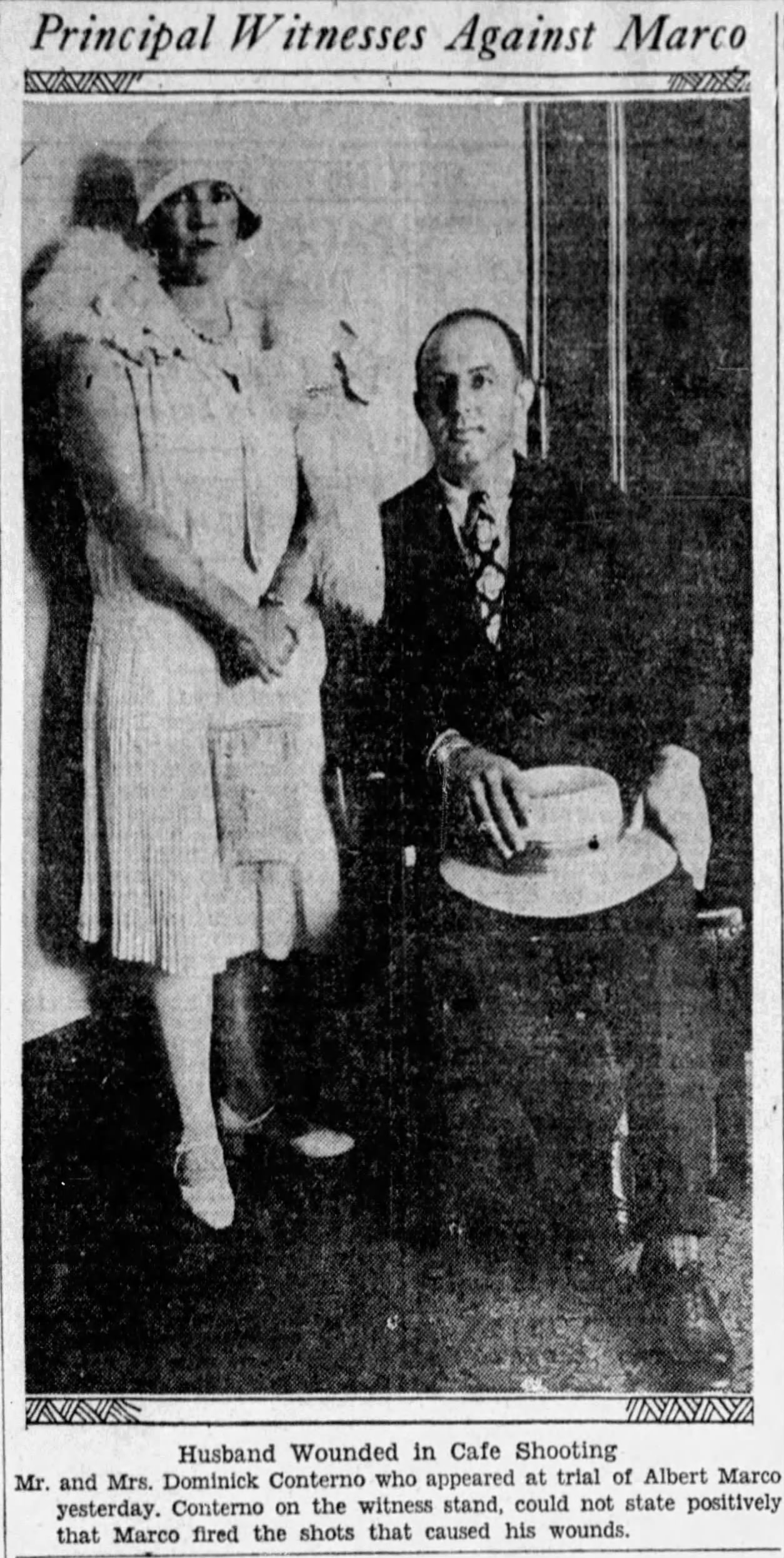
Mr. and Mrs. Dominick Conterno - "Principal Witnesses Against Marco" (Los Angeles Times, July 18, 1928)

On the evening of June 27, 1928, Marco was welcomed to the Ship Cafe in Venice, California, by restauranteur and retired boxer Tommy Jacobs. Marco was in the company of three friends. As the party continued, "Marco became embroiled in an argument with other customers that escalated into fist fighting. Outnumbered, the gangster reached for his gun and fired. Two men were wounded." According to one history, "the testimony of witnesses at the cafe presents a sketch of Marco's less-than-sophisticated personality. According to one witness—a friend of one of the men who was shot—the trouble started after Marco approached him and made a derogatory comment about his dancing partner, implying she was a prostitute". As told by the writers of "The Lid Off Los Angeles" series published in Liberty magazine in 1939, "Marco insulted a woman one night in the Ship Café in Venice, California. The woman's escort invited him into the men's room for the announced purpose of beating his ugly face in, Marco, a big man, accepted and took an awful beating before two of his henchmen rescued him. They knocked his opponent to the floor. Marco drew a gun and put a bullet into the helpless man." Early in the morning of June 28, Marco was arrested by officer John Brunty, and eventually put on trial for assault with a deadly weapon in the shooting of Dominick Conterno and Harry Judson. Marco was not an ideal witness in his own defense, as evidenced by attorney Dave Clark's cross-examination of him:

Clark: "Did you fire the shots?"
Marco: "No."
Clark: "But you were at the Ship Café that night."
Marco: "Yes."
Clark: "You heard the shots?"
Marco: "Yes."
Clark: "Where were you at the time?"
Marco: "I can't remember."
Clark: "Many witnesses have testified that you did indeed fire the shots. You took aim and shot Dominick Conterno in the back."
Marco: "I didn't fire those shots. But if the jury believes I did I want them to know I was acting in self-defense."

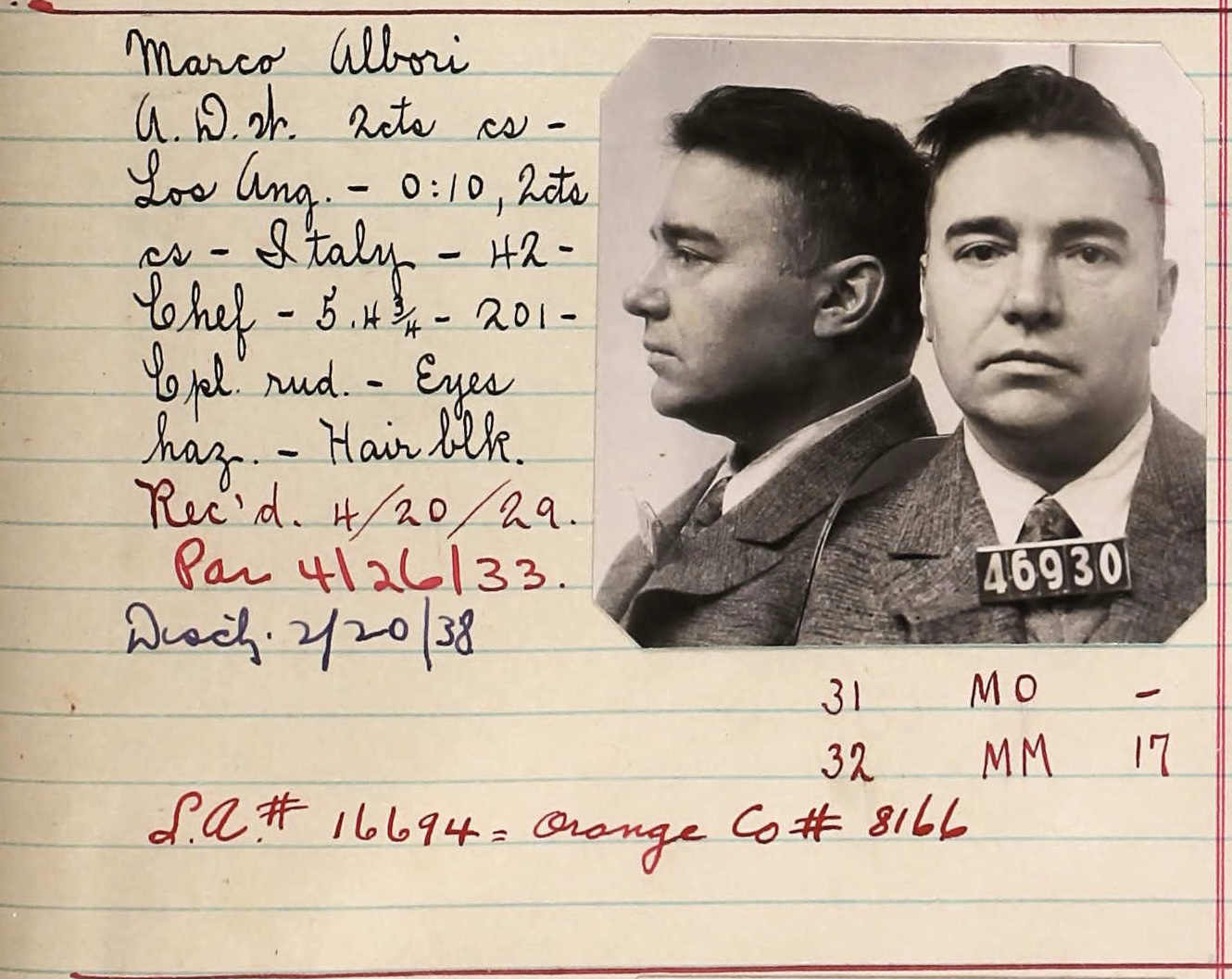
Marco Albori (inmate 46930) in the San Quentin prisoner record book

Marco was found guilty on two counts and was sentenced to two seven-year terms by judge William C. Doran. On April 1, 1929, Marco was sent to San Quentin State Prison to serve his sentence. Marco appealed the ruling, but was denied a second trial. He was paroled on April 7, 1933. Marco was deported to Italy in November 1933.

== Later life ==
Marco returned to Los Angeles in 1937 hoping to permanently stay in the United States, but he was denied and ordered to return to Italy again. In 1952, a Daily News staff writer named Jack Strange claimed that Marco was still alive and living in Venice, Italy, where he ran a restaurant. He died in prison in Chino, California in 1954.

== See also ==
- Earl Kynette, police officer who testified in Marco's defense
- Prostitution in Los Angeles in the 19th century
