= Illustrated Daily News (disambiguation) =

Illustrated Daily News may refer to:

- Illustrated Daily News, (1923-1954) or Los Angeles Daily News in Los Angeles, later merged to Los Angeles Mirror
- Illustrated Daily News (New York), founded in 1919 by Joseph Medill Patterson and later renamed New York Daily News
