= Helen Brush Jenkins =

American photographer (1919–2013)

- Born: Helen Marie Pfeiffer; April 1919; Omaha, Nebraska, U.S.
- Died: June 12, 2013 (aged 94); Chicago, Illinois, U.S.
- Occupation: Photographer
- Spouse: Gilmer Brush
- Children: 1

Helen Marie Brush Jenkins (April 1919 – June 12, 2013) was one of the first women News Photographers in the world. Brush Jenkins, based in Los Angeles California where she got her start working for the now-defunct Los Angeles Daily News, beginning in the 1940s, she was considered a pioneer in the news industry. At the time, she was the first woman who worked as a news photographer. She disliked being called a Photo Journalist and insisted on being known as a News Photog. Taught by her husband Gilmer, (Gib), Brush, she took his job at the Daily News when he went to war as a photographer for the OSS. She worked for the Daily News for more than twelve years. Her subjects included President Harry Truman, U.S. First Lady Eleanor Roosevelt, Clark Gable, John Wayne and Charlie Chaplin.

In 1953, Brush Jenkins photographed her newborn son, Gilmer, who was only one minute old at the time was picture was taken. Her photograph, taken just after delivery, was published in Time Magazine two weeks later.

Brush Jenkins was born Helen Marie Pfeiffer in Omaha, Nebraska, in 1919. She died on June 12, 2013, in Chicago at the age of 94.
