= Abbot Kinney Pier =

U.S. amusement park (1905–1920)

Abbot Kinney's Venice Pier
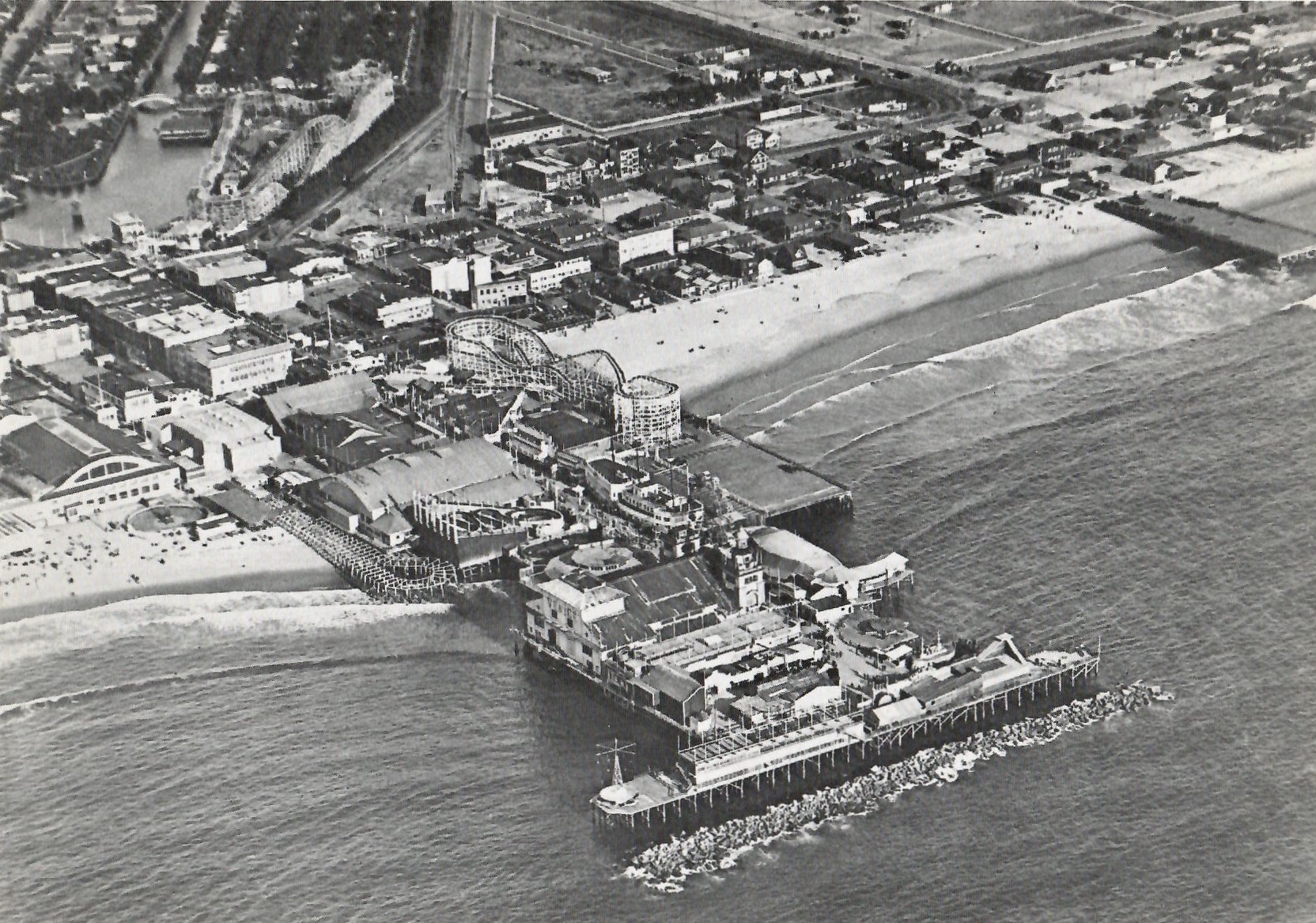
- Aerial view of Venice Pier in 1920
- Owner: Abbot Kinney

Characteristics
- Total length: 1,600 ft (490 m)

History
- Designer: Marsh & Russell
- Opening date: July 4, 1905
- Destruction date: December 20, 1920

Abbot Kinney's Venice Pier, also known as the Abbot Kinney Pier, the first Venice Pier, the Windward Avenue Pier, or the Venice Wharf, stood over the Pacific Ocean at Venice, Los Angeles County, California, United States, from 1905 until it was destroyed in the 1920 Abbot Kinney pier fire.

== History ==
Commissioned by real estate developer Abbot Kinney as part of his "Venice of America", the pier was 1,600 ft (490 m) long. The Ship Cafe was built at the same time, and was originally intended to be a full-service resort "with sleeping apartments, a restaurant, a kitchen, office and all of the appointments of the modern hotel".

The Venice Auditorium performance venue at the end of the pier had 3,600 seats. The Venice Plunge indoor saltwater swimming pool, which was located around the corner on Ocean Front Walk, had 1,500 dressing rooms at opening.

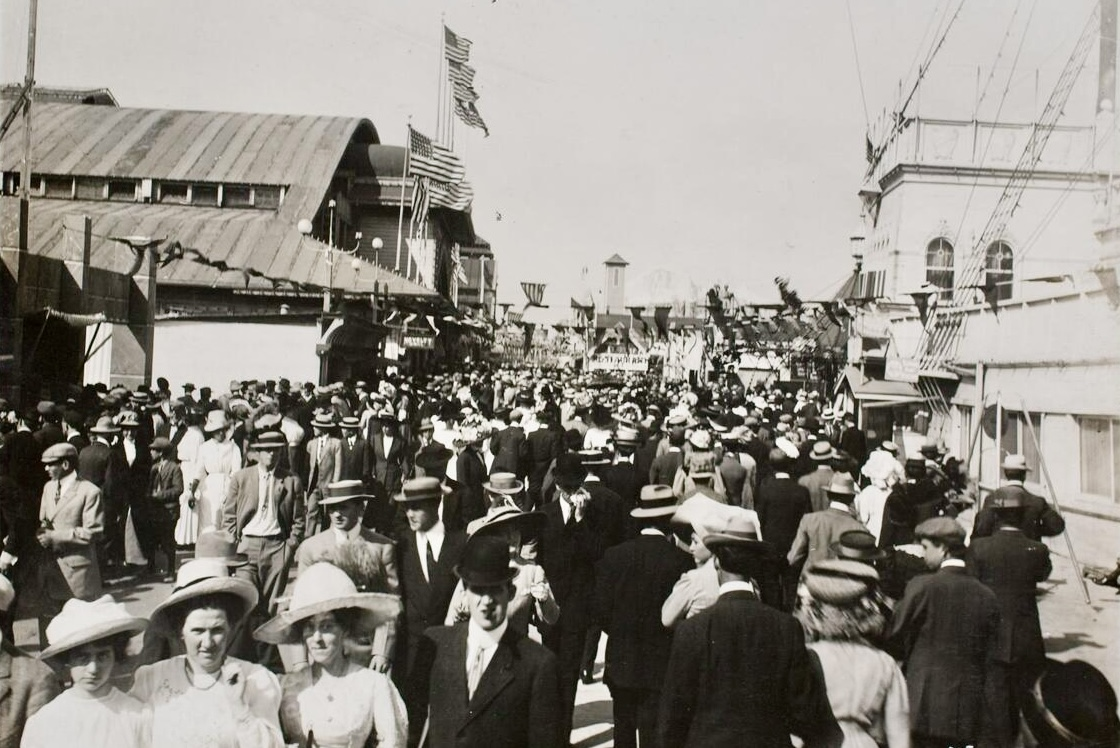
Crowd on Venice Amusement Pier c. 1910 (L.A. Herald Photo Collection, USC Libraries)

The Venice Aquarium was a double-duty tourist attraction and marine mammal research facility. Along the boardwalk of the pier were approximately 40 concessions and rides including the Ocean Inn, pool hall, bowling alley, merry-go-round, the "Joy Wheel," the Whip, the Virginia Reel, the Over the Falls, the Captive Aeroplanes, a "pigsty slide with a large number of small animals," the Longworthy fish market, The Steeplechase, Hilarity Hall, a seaplane ride, glassblowers, a Ferris wheel, a shooting gallery, the "Old Mill," the Dipper, and Stimpson's candy shop. The pier had an automobile parking garage as of 1920.

The pier was damaged by storms on multiple occasions, the two most notable being the nearly finished pier being wrecked by high waves and wind prior to the 1905 opening, and the New Year's Day 1914 storm that caused $100,000 in damages.

== 1920 pier fire ==
1920 Venice Pier fire
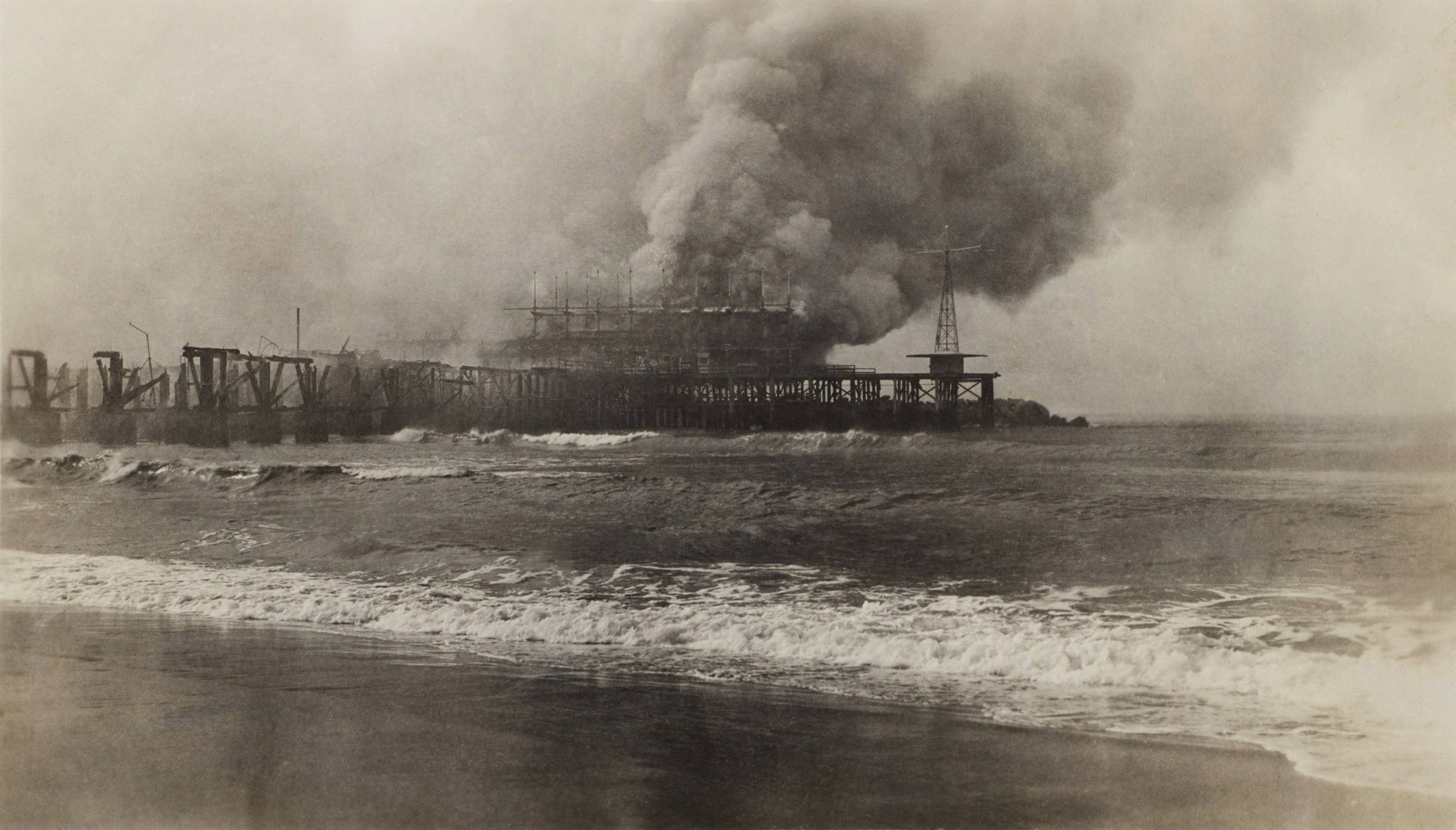
- Abbot Kinney pier burns in Venice (Ernest Marquez California History Collection, Huntington Library
- Date: December 20, 1920
- Time: 9:50 a.m. (PST)
- Duration: 4.5 hours
- Deaths: 1
- Injuries: 5
- Property damage: US$1,000,000 (equivalent to $16,071,429 in 2025)

The Venice Pier caught fire on December 20, 1920, just a month after the death of its developer, Abbot Kinney. The fire was first discovered in the dance hall; as the fire rose around them, the band played a rousing march to rally the guests through an orderly evacuation. The dance hall was located on the north side of the pier, about 150 ft (46 m) west of the water line.

Firefighter Arthur Harlan was killed when the wall of the Ocean Inn collapsed on top of him.

== Venice Amusement Pier ==
The pier was rebuilt as Venice Amusement Pier and reopened on May 28, 1921. Venice Amusement Pier was the original site of the Jantzen Beach Carousel (Parker Superior Park #2), installed in 1921. The C. W. Parker company repossessed the carousel in 1924 for non-payment; it was later replaced with Parker #142. The Superior Park model Parker carousel was installed at Jantzen Beach Amusement Park in 1928.

== Additional images ==
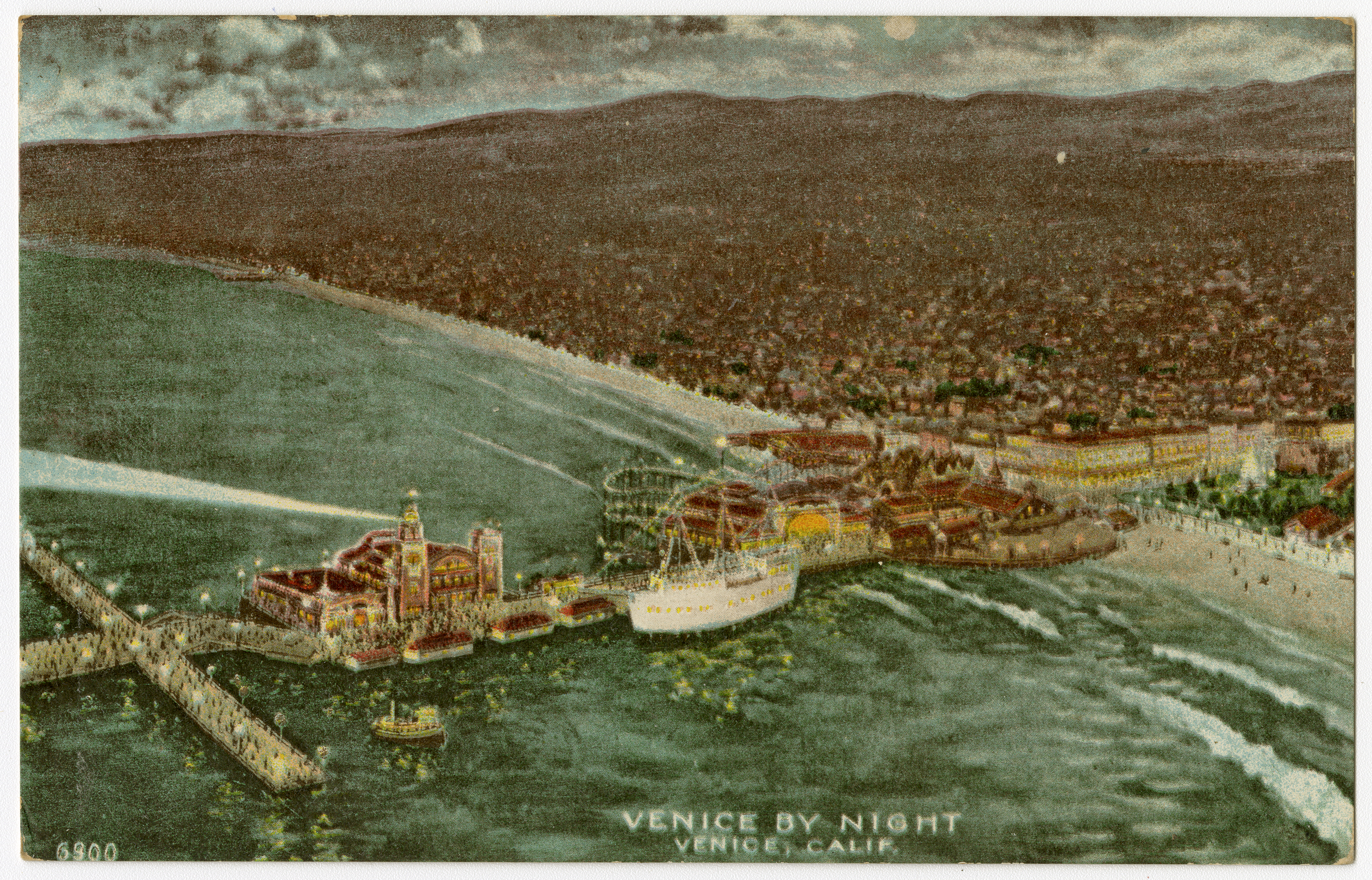
Postcard of Venice at night c. 1910

== See also ==
- Venice Short Line
- Venice Miniature Railway
- Venice Fishing Pier
