= Cornelius Vanderbilt IV =

American journalist and publisher (1898–1974)

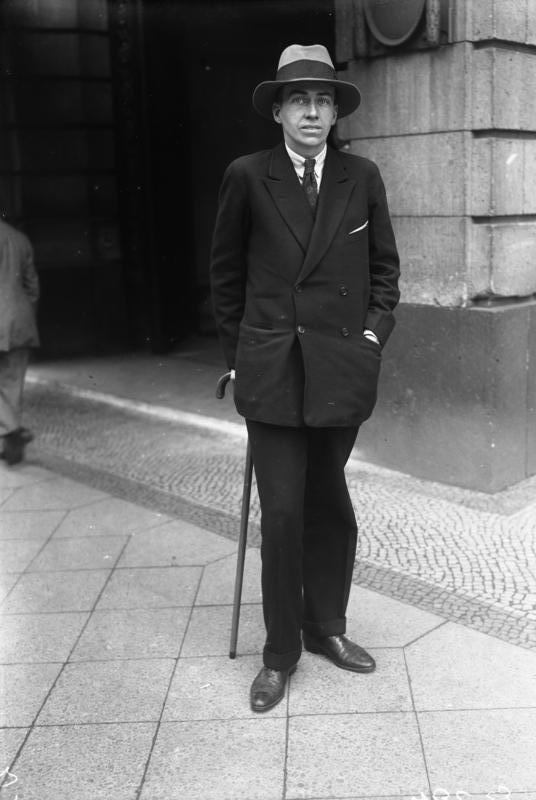
- Vanderbilt in 1926
- Born: April 30, 1898; Staten Island, New York, U.S.
- Died: July 7, 1974 (aged 76); Miami Beach, Florida, U.S.
- Other name: Cornelius Vanderbilt Jr.
- Education: St. Paul's School
- Spouses: Rachel Littleton (m. 1920; div. 1927) Mary Weir Logan (m. 1928; div. 1931) Helen Virginia Varner (m. 1935; div. 1940) Maria Feliza Pablos (m. 1946; div. 1948) Patricia Puanan Murphy (m. 1948; div. 1953) Anna Bernadetta Needham (m. 1957; div. 1960) Mary Lou Bristol (m. 1967)
- Parent(s): Cornelius Vanderbilt III; Grace Graham Wilson
- Family: Vanderbilt

Cornelius Vanderbilt IV (April 30, 1898 – July 7, 1974) was a newspaper publisher, journalist, author, and military officer. He was an outcast of high society, and was disinherited by his parents when he became a newspaper publisher. He desired to live a "normal" life but was burdened by large debt and could not maintain the lifestyle associated with his family's social position to which he had become accustomed.

== Early life ==
Cornelius Vanderbilt IV was born on April 30, 1898, in Staten Island to Cornelius "Neily" Vanderbilt III (1873–1942) and Grace Graham Wilson (1870–1953). Throughout his life, the younger Vanderbilt was known as "Cornelius Vanderbilt, Jr." whereas his father, after 1918, was commonly referred to as "General Vanderbilt", as he had served as a brigadier general in the First World War. The younger Vanderbilt was commonly called "Neil" by his family and friends.

Vanderbilt attended Harstrom's Tutoring School and St. Paul's School as a young man. He was preparing to enter Yale University when his studies were interrupted by the entry of the United States into the First World War in April 1917 – shortly before his 19th birthday.

== Career ==
=== World War I service ===
Shortly after the United States declared war on Germany, much to the chagrin of his mother, Vanderbilt enlisted in the U.S. Army in July 1917, at the age of 19. He was originally assigned to the headquarters of the ammunition train of the 27th Division of the New York National Guard, commanded by Major General John F. O'Ryan. His first posting was in Spartanburg, South Carolina where he was a wagoner driving mules. As this assignment was not to his liking, Vanderbilt made a deal with General O'Ryan's orderly into changing his orders to go with the division overseas. In exchange, Vanderbilt became the orderly's assistant and helped with various chores.

He went overseas with the division in May 1918 aboard the transport Great Northern. Upon arriving in Brest, France, he was assigned as an orderly to the commander of the U.S. Army stockade there. Vanderbilt disliked his commander, whom he referred to as "my torturer". By chance, he was able to get a temporary assignment as driver to General Douglas Haig, the commander of the British forces in France. He got the posting when he was in a group of soldiers who asked if anyone knew how to drive a Rolls-Royce. Vanderbilt raised his hand since his family only used Rolls-Royces and he was familiar with the peculiarities of their operation.

After his posting with General Haig, Vanderbilt was reassigned to the 27th Division's headquarters where he served as a driver delivering dispatches. While driving on one mission, Vanderbilt had a near fatal accident.

Vanderbilt's father was promoted to brigadier general in July 1918. Both Vanderbilts returned to the United States in August 1918 after three months of service in France. His father was reassigned as a brigade commander at Camp Lewis in Washington state. The younger Vanderbilt was promoted to the rank of wagoner (equivalent to a corporal) on August 24 and served as a transportation instructor at American Lake, adjacent to Camp Lewis for the remainder of his military service.

Vanderbilt was honorably discharged from the Army on January 25, 1919. Shortly thereafter, he was promoted to 2nd lieutenant of the Infantry branch in the Officers Reserve Corps.

=== Post war life ===
To his parents' dismay, he decided to become a newspaperman. His parents detested the press, seen by them as an invasion of privacy. He worked as a staff member of the New York Herald and later The New York Times in which he had several articles published. Considered a bohemian by his parents, he was frequently at odds with them.

In the early 1920s, Vanderbilt launched several newspapers and tabloids; the Los Angeles Illustrated Daily News, the San Francisco Illustrated Daily Herald and the Miami Illustrated Daily Tab among them. Despite claiming to uphold the highest standards of journalistic excellence, his publishing career lasted only two and a half years, and Vanderbilt Inc. ceased operations with losses amounting to nearly $6 million. Vanderbilt subsequently went to work as an assistant managing editor of the New York Daily Mirror.

In 1922, he joined the newly organized New York Civitan Club, an organization whose purpose is "to build good citizenship by providing a volunteer organization of clubs dedicated to serving individual and community needs with an emphasis on helping people with developmental disabilities."

In 1926, he interviewed Benito Mussolini in Italy. Mussolini's car, with Vanderbilt as passenger, hit a child at high speed, killing the child, while the car kept going. Mussolini turned to Vanderbilt and said, "What is one life in the affairs of a state?" Vanderbilt repeated the story at an Affiliated Bureaus of America convention in New York on November 30, 1930. When a guest at the convention, Major General Smedley Butler repeated the story at a speech in Philadelphia on January 19, 1931, it created an international incident, with Secretary of State Henry L. Stimson apologizing to Mussolini, while Butler was court-martialled.

In 1929, he released Reno, a novel about divorce set in Reno, Nevada, where he had been living since his first divorce in 1927. The book was adapted into the similarly titled 1930 film Reno, starring Ruth Roland in her sound film debut. Then, in 1931, he was engaged by Columbia Pictures to make a comedy about the city, in association with John P. Medbury, a humorist

=== Hitler's Reign of Terror ===
In 1934 Vanderbilt made the anti-Nazi documentary, Hitler's Reign of Terror. This film was made covertly by Vanderbilt while visiting Nazi Germany shortly after Hitler's rise to power. As its name implies, it is an exposé of the Nazi regime and is regarded as the first anti-Nazi film produced. It particularly highlights the Nazis' oppression of Jews.

In the film, Vanderbilt describes Hitler as a combination of politician Huey Long, preacher Billy Sunday and gangster Al Capone. It featured several re-enacted scenes including a brief meeting with Hitler and an interview with former German emperor Kaiser Wilhelm, which was necessary as the original encounters were not filmed. In his autobiographical Farewell to Fifth Avenue, Vanderbilt recounts attempting to interview Hitler a second time but balking at a Nazi demand that he make a $5,000 donation to the party, ostensibly to benefit the families of Nazis who died in the Beer Hall Putsch.

When Hitler's Reign of Terror was released on April 30, 1934, a diplomatic protest was made against it by the German embassy. It was banned in New York state, and Illinois would not allow its showing until the title was changed to Hitler Reigns. It received poor reviews and one reviewer scoffed at its prediction that Germany under Hitler would eventually pose a threat to world peace. The film was believed lost for many years until a single surviving copy was found in Belgium. The film was screened at the Museum of Modern Art in New York in 2013.

=== Farewell to Fifth Avenue ===
In 1935 Vanderbilt published his autobiography named Farewell to Fifth Avenue. The book provides significant insight to life of those in high society in the early 20th century. In the book Vanderbilt recounts vacationing in Europe on his father's yacht North Star, his military experience in the First World War and his experiences as a newspaper publisher.

As the book's title implies, it was also Vanderbilt's point of no return in his rejection of the artifice of high society. Vanderbilt examines the artificial distinctions by which one is considered worthy to be a member of "society". He comments, "all of them building high fences and beating their heads against a stone wall, hating each other and boiling in their own juices and ... playing, for all it's worth, the game called Society."

The book also recounts Vanderbilt acquaintance with a number of high-profile personages, some of whom he was able to interview during his trip to Europe in 1933, while gathering material for his film Hitler's Reign of Terror. These include President Franklin Roosevelt, Kaiser Wilhelm, Benito Mussolini, Pope Pius XI, Joseph Stalin, and Al Capone.

In addition to Farewell to Fifth Avenue, Vanderbilt authored other books, including a biography of his mother titled Queen of the Golden Age and Personal Experiences of a Cub Reporter.

=== World War II service ===
In 1938, Vanderbilt was commissioned in the United States Army Reserve. As of 1941 he was on active duty with the rank of major in the Intelligence Corps. He was presented with a commendation by the FBI, probably for counterintelligence work, in 1942. As of December 1942 he was hospitalized at Walter Reed Hospital and was discharged from the Army in 1943 due to poor health.

=== Later life ===
In 1945, Vanderbilt became a member of the Society of the Cincinnati in Rhode Island by right of his descent from his granduncle, Major Ebenezer Flagg of the 1st Rhode Island Regiment, who was killed in battle in 1781.

In 1953, Vanderbilt obtained a divorce in Nevada from his fifth wife, Patricia Murphy Vanderbilt. Patricia appealed the divorce on the grounds that Cornelius did not have permanent residence in Nevada and the Nevada divorce did not overrule the terms of a separation decree she had earlier obtained in New York. The appeals went all the way to the United States Supreme Court which ruled in Patricia's favor in 1957.

Vanderbilt made his home in Reno, Nevada, and continued to write and lecture on world affairs. In 1948 he was a strong supporter of the newly created state of Israel.

In 1960, he joined Airtronics International Corporation of Fort Lauderdale, Florida as a vice president and director. In that role, he acted as a liaison executive between Airtronics and its civilian customers.

== Personal life ==
Vanderbilt was married seven times, but had no children. His first wedding, an elaborate affair for over 3,000 people, took place on April 29, 1920, where Vanderbilt married New York socialite Rachel Littleton (1901–1988), the sister of prominent lawyer and politician Martin W. Littleton. The marriage ended in divorce in 1927, after Vanderbilt lost more than $2,000,000 in tabloid newspaper ventures. She later married Jasper Morgan (1900–1964), a nephew of J. P. Morgan.

In July 1928, he married Mrs. Mary Weir Logan (1905–1984), who obtained a divorce from her former husband, Waldo Hancock Logan, a half hour before the ceremony. After a subsequent marriage and divorce to actress Ruthelma Stevens, Logan committed suicide in Miami after ending up penniless. Mary and Cornelius divorced in August 1931.

On January 4, 1935, the 36-year-old Vanderbilt married Helen Virginia Varner (1908–1979), who was 26, after meeting her in Albuquerque, New Mexico, three years earlier while he was writing a novel and she was sketching. She was the daughter of Dr. H. V. Varner of Clarksburg, West Virginia, and the former wife of Noah “Andy” Anderson, a West Virginia high school athletic coach. They divorced in 1940. She later married Jack Frye, founder of TWA.

In 1946, he married Maria Feliza Pablos (1911–2007), heiress to a vast cattle estate in Mexico. She was a grandniece of Porfirio Diaz (1830–1915), the former President of Mexico, and a granddaughter of Dr. Francisco Castillo Nájera (1886–1954), the former Mexican Ambassador to the United States. They divorced on April 29, 1948.

Later that same year on September 7, 1948, the 50-year-old Vanderbilt married Patricia Puanan Murphy Wallace (1920–1971), who was 28, at the Pickwick Arms Hotel in Greenwich, Connecticut. She was previously married to Earl Wallace, a Hollywood photographer. They divorced in 1953.

In 1957, the 59-year-old Vanderbilt married Anna Bernadetta Needham (1933–1992), his 25-year-old secretary. Among the guests at the wedding, which took place at the home of his lawyer, John Sinai, were Charles H. Russell, the Governor of Nevada, and George W. Malone, U.S. Senator from Nevada. They divorced on May 5, 1960.

In 1967, Vanderbilt, now 69, married Mary Lou Gardiner Bristol, who was 41, in Reno, Nevada. She was previously married to Albert S. Bristol of Terrell, Texas, with whom she had three children. They remained married until his death in 1974.

Throughout his adult life, Vanderbilt struggled with being rejected by "society" on the one hand and the expectations of "common" people due to his perceived wealth and power due to his family background. He was also frustrated by his unsuccessful business ventures.

== Death and burial ==
Cornelius Vanderbilt IV died on July 7, 1974, aged 76, in Miami Beach, Florida and was buried in the Vanderbilt family mausoleum in the Moravian Cemetery on Staten Island.

== Published works ==
- Lines From the Front Lines, 1918.
- The Gas Attack, 1919.
- Experiences of a Cub Reporter, George Sully and Company, New York, 1920.
- Reno, 1929. (Source material for the 1939 film, Reno)
- Park Avenue, 1928.
- Palm Beach, 1929.
- Farewell to Fifth Avenue, 1935.
- A Woman of Washington, E. P. Dutton, Inc., New York, 1937.
- Filthy Rich, 1939
- The Living Past of America, Crown Publishers, New York, 1955. LCCN 55–7242.
- Man of the World: My Life on Five Continents, Crown Publishers, New York, 1959.

== Military awards ==
- World War I Victory Medal
- American Defense Service Medal
- American Campaign Medal
- World War II Victory Medal
