= Hitler's Reign of Terror =

- Directed by: Michael Mindlin
- Written by: Joseph Seiden
- Produced by: Samuel Cummins; Joseph Seiden
- Narrated by: Edwin C. Hill
- Cinematography: Cornelius Vanderbilt IV
- Edited by: Sam Rosen
- Distributed by: Eureka Productions; Jewel Productions
- Release date: 1934 (US)
- Running time: 65 minutes
- Country: United States
- Language: English

Trailer for Hitler's Reign of Terror

Hitler's Reign of Terror is an 1934 anti-fascist independent film that attacked the activities of Adolf Hitler in Nazi Germany, and is often credited as being the "first-ever American anti-Nazi film." The film is a combination of newsreel footage, documentary, and reenactment. Despite the fact that the New York State Censor Board refused the film a license, it played for two weeks in New York City theaters which filled to capacity. In Chicago, the film was only released after the title was changed to Hitler Reigns to placate the German government.

Mordaunt Hall gave the film a negative review in The New York Times when it was released. Film Daily scoffed at the film for its prediction that Hitler's Germany was a future threat to world peace.

== Background ==
After returning from World War I, Cornelius Vanderbilt, Jr. lived in various places around the United States from New York to California and back again – along the way trying his hand at founding a newspaper and failing. In early 1933, he departed for Paris and began traveling around European capitals, along with two French cameramen, ultimately ending up in Vienna to cover mass meetings and political demonstrations. Although Vanderbilt had his sights set on an interview with Adolf Hitler, he asked the former Crown Prince of Germany, whom he had previously interviewed, why "you Hohenzollerns are so much easier to see than Hitler?"

Finally, on March 5, 1933, the day that the Nazi Party, in a coalition with the DNVP, obtained a parliamentary majority, Vanderbilt was able to secure what would be the closest he would get to an interview with Hitler. Amid the chaos, Vanderbilt yelled, "And what about the Jews, Your Excellency?", referring to the so-called "Jewish problem". Hitler shrugged off the question and instructed Vanderbilt to set up a meeting with Ernst "Putzi" Hanfstaengl, one of Hitler's intimates at the time. This meeting never took place.

== Story ==
The picture opens with a re-enacted phone call between reporter Cornelius Vanderbilt, Jr. in Germany and narrator Edwin C. Hill in New York. Then a parade of people carrying torchlights in Berlin, where Jewish works and other political books are burned. Vanderbilt meets with Hill, and then flies out of the country. Hill talks with Vanderbilt about the problems in his country, then a re-enacted interview between Adolf Hitler and Vanderbilt. During a viewing of World War I battle footage, Hitler's home town, Braunau am Inn, Austria, and his parents' graves are shown.

Vanderbilt goes to Vienna, to see Chancellor Dollfuss, and he films several Austrian Nazi riots during a parade. In a re-enactment, Vanderbilt's passport is stolen, and there are several shots of Nazis abusing Jews. In yet another re-enactment, Vanderbilt interviews Crown Prince Wilhelm, and more books are burned. Helen Keller talks to an interviewer about her books, which were burned by the Nazis. Then a conversation between Vanderbilt, Kaiser Wilhelm II in Doorn, Holland, and Prince Louis Ferdinand is re-enacted.

Actual anti-Nazi speeches given by prominent Jews and some Gentiles are shown, and the Nazis are shown trying to alter the Bible. In the final scene, Congressman Samuel Dickstein of New York and Hill give speeches directly to the audience, explaining the dangers of Nazism.

== Production ==
The 65 minutes of Hitler's Reign of Terror combines footage that Vanderbilt shot, after his "interview" with Hitler, of Jewish refugees in Germany; previously compiled American newsreel footage; and reenactments of the various conversations and interactions that Vanderbilt had with officials while traveling throughout Europe. Initially, Vanderbilt found it difficult to find a major production company to produce the film. However, he worked out a partnership with two different producers, Joseph Seiden and Samuel Cummins. Vanderbilt edited the film with Edwin Hill and hired Mike Mindlin, known for his adult film This Nude World (1933), as the director.

== Reception ==
Hitler's Reign of Terror made its debut in theaters at the Mayfair Theatre on New York's Broadway on April 30, 1934. The movie brought the theater's biggest opening day on record to that point. The Production Code Administration (PCA) was not yet operational; however, the film was still subject to scrutiny from the more familiar Motion Picture Producers and Distributors of America (MPPDA). Rory Norr was sent by the MPPDA to view the film at its opening, and report back on whether he felt the content was appropriate for the big screen. His conclusions were that the film "included only a few original 'reproductions' of alleged interviews had by Mr. Cornelius Vanderbilt, Jr. with the Kaiser, Mr. Hitler, and others. A general statement on the screen covered the fact that such interviews were 'reproductions' and it was obvious that the actors took the parts of the Kaiser, Hitler, and others in certain scenes." As such, he concluded on the question of whether or not the movie should be considered a propaganda film and banned from theaters, "The fact that it is a propaganda picture does not make it necessarily unsuitable for the screen... There is no more reason why a theater owner may not take a given side on a public question than why a newspaper publisher should not adopt definite policy one way or another re Hitlerism."

The German reaction to the film, however, was not as favorable. Upon request from the German ambassador in Washington D.C., a review conducted by George R. Canty on behalf of the Department of Commerce yielded the result that "the film serves no good purpose."

After the Department of Commerce review, many further American censors followed suit in their fear to offend the Nazis. The New York State Censor Board, for one, eventually banned the film throughout the state.

After having passed the review of the Chicago Board of Censors, Hitler's Reign of Terror became the subject of concern for Chicago's Nazi consul, who eventually convinced the city government to halt the release of the film until certain changes were made.

== Loss and rediscovery ==
In 2013, Thomas Doherty published Hollywood and Hitler, 1933-1939, which explored the relationship between the American film industry and Nazi Germany. Doherty was unable to find a copy of Hitler's Reign of Terror until late into his research, when he learned that the Royal Belgian Film Archive in Brussels had located a copy of the film in their possession. Doherty's theory is that a Belgian film distributor must have ordered a copy of the film from outside the country before the Nazis invaded Belgium in 1940. Being a foreign film, the copy had to clear customs. After the Nazis invaded the country, though, the distributor likely did not want to be caught with the film, and never picked it up from customs. As a result, the film lay on a back shelf in cold storage in Belgium for almost eighty years.
