= Ship Cafe (Venice, California) =

Landmark in Venice, California (1903–1946)

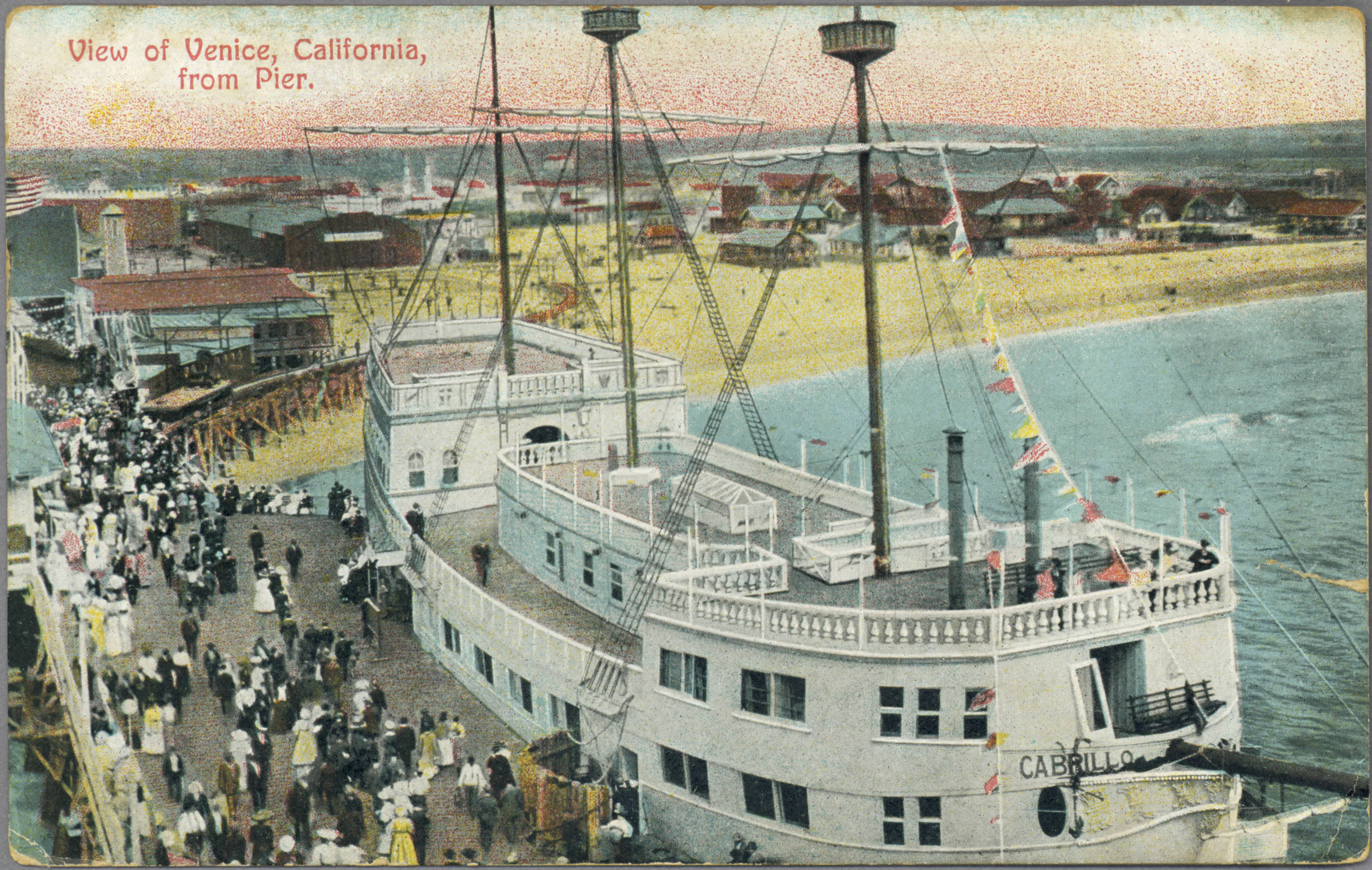
- Ship Cafe Cabrillo
- Interactive map of the Ship Cafe area
- Former names: Cabrillo's, Ship Hotel, hotel ship Cabrillo, Baron Long's Ship Cafe, Covington's Ship Cafe, Volga Boat, Show-Boat Café, Ship Cafe at Venice-by-the-Sea

General information
- Location: Venice Pier at Windward Avenue, Venice, Los Angeles County, California, United States
- Coordinates: 33.985°N 118.477°W

Design and construction
- Architecture firm: Marsh & Russell
- Developer: Abbot Kinney

The Ship Cafe was a landmark of Venice, California, United States, from 1903 to 1946. Built along the Venice Pier over the water off Windward Avenue, the restaurant and event space was known for its sumptuous food and prestigious clientele. The ship was a novelty building, set on concrete pilings, and not actually a sea-worthy vessel.

== History ==
Built by Abbot Kinney beginning in 1903, the restaurant was designed to be a feature of the resort town of Venice. A "first draft" of the Ship Cafe was washed away by a sea storm on March 13, 1905; Kinney hired 600 laborers to rebuild it in time for a summer opening.

The restaurant sat on pilings, and was designed by Norman Foote Marsh and Clarence H. Russell to be an approximation of the San Salvador, Juan Rodríguez Cabrillo's "Spanish galleon." As a tourist guide put it, "It was his thought to moor by the sea-wall this white caravel, to fit it with anchor lamps and nautical furnishings and to place on the deck musicians in 16th-century capes and the hats of the Spanish minstrel."

The restaurant opened in August 1904, under the management of Carlos Marchetti. According to a 1913 report, there was seating for 475 on two decks, as well as rooms for private parties. The upper dining room displayed relics from the shipwreck Santa Rosa. The kitchen drew upon fresh seafood, including halibut, bass, and sand dabs, held in a giant tank under the pier. At one time, the chef paid local kids five cents a pound to dig up cockles from the Del Rey Lagoon. According to a 1916 article in Photoplay, "The Ship with its light-dotted masts towering high above the crowds on the Windward Avenue pier is one of the landmarks of California's Great White Way. Aboard the Ship the nautical illusion is made complete by the ship's bell upon which is struck the time in sea-fashion. Dancing always ceases at two bells of the mid-watch."

According to the Los Angeles Herald, food prices increased at the Ship Cafe after Prohibition kicked in, to compensate for lower revenue compared to "olden days [when] the Ship cafe was astounding by reason of the amount of liquor dispensed across its table." Apparently the building's "hotel rooms and private salons" allowed for illegal drinking during Prohibition served by "waiters dressed like 16th-century naval officers."

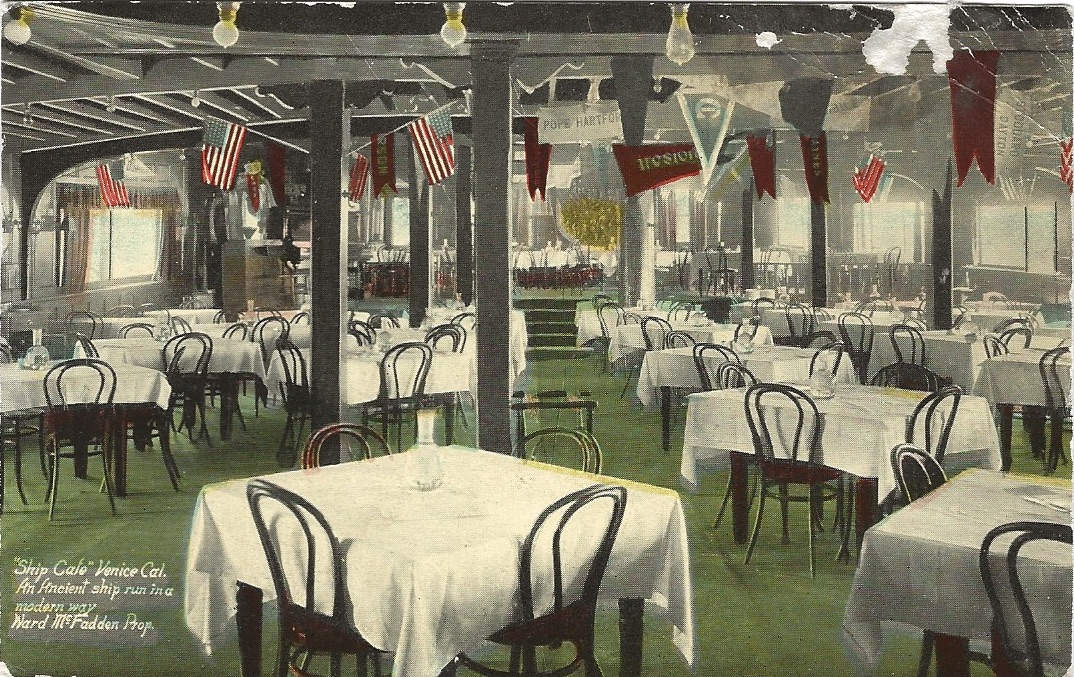
Dining room of the Ship Cafe c. 1911

The original structure, located across from the pier ballroom, burned in the 1920 Abbot Kinney Pier fire and was rebuilt the following year as a larger copy on the same plan, at an estimated cost of $40,000. The new Ship Cafe opened June 28, 1921. The second ship had two masts, rather than the original three. The ship had a "Spirit of the Seas" figurehead carved by O. S. Sarsi with contest winner Jacqueline Faust as the model. The rebuilt structure was oriented north-south, whereas the original was oriented east-west. In 1922, the owners were said to be $100,000 in debt and the Los Angeles Board of Trade would be taking control of the restaurant. One visitor recalled that the interior of the rebuilt ship "was all lovely mahogany."

When the Great Depression hit California, the Ship Cafe suffered along with the rest of the amusement and recreation business and, according to one account, "the carpeting...was worn, and no music was played on its bandstand." The second version of the Ship Cafe survived until 1946, when the Venice pier complex was sold off and demolished.

== Clientele ==
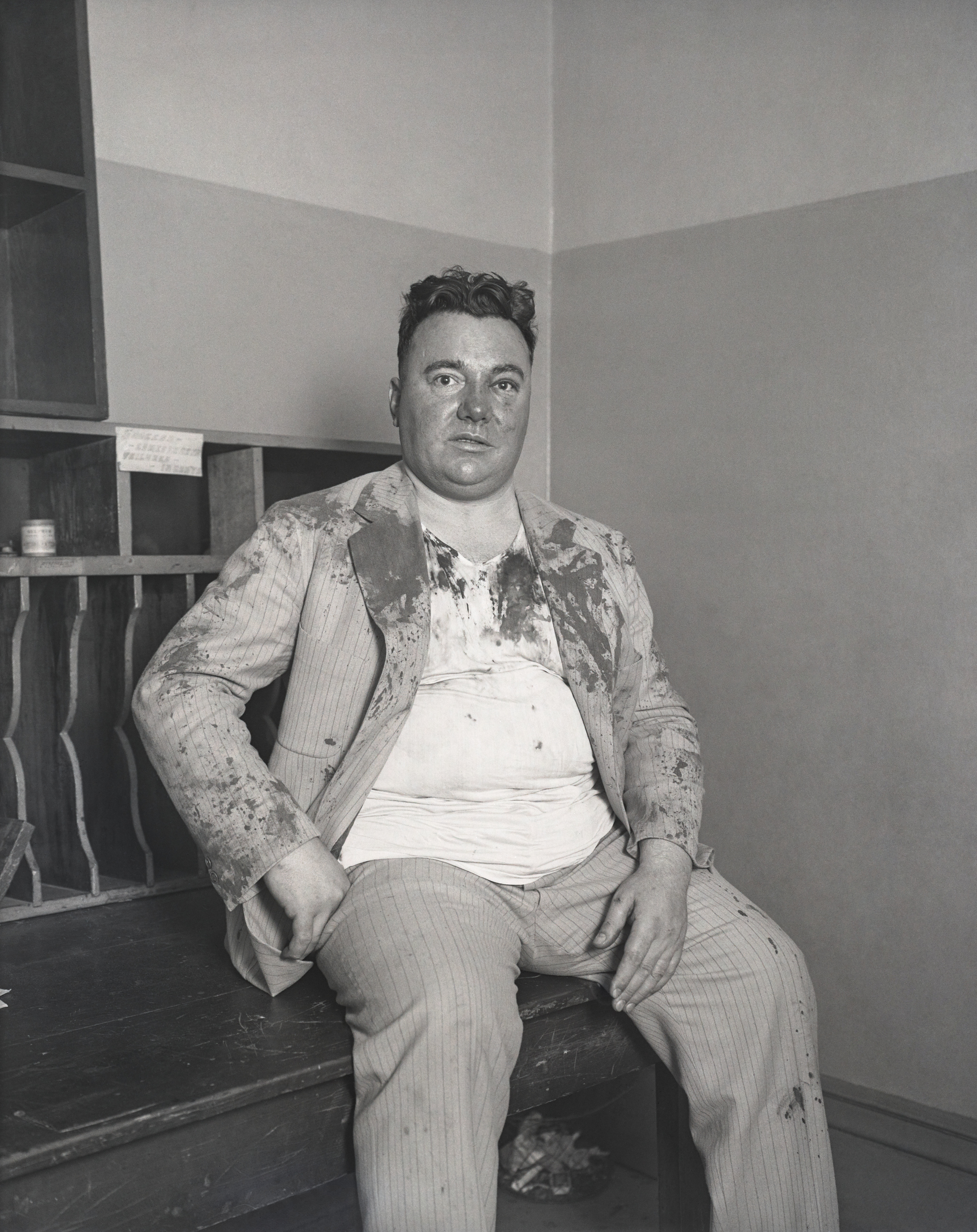
Albert Marco, covered in blood after the 1928 shooting

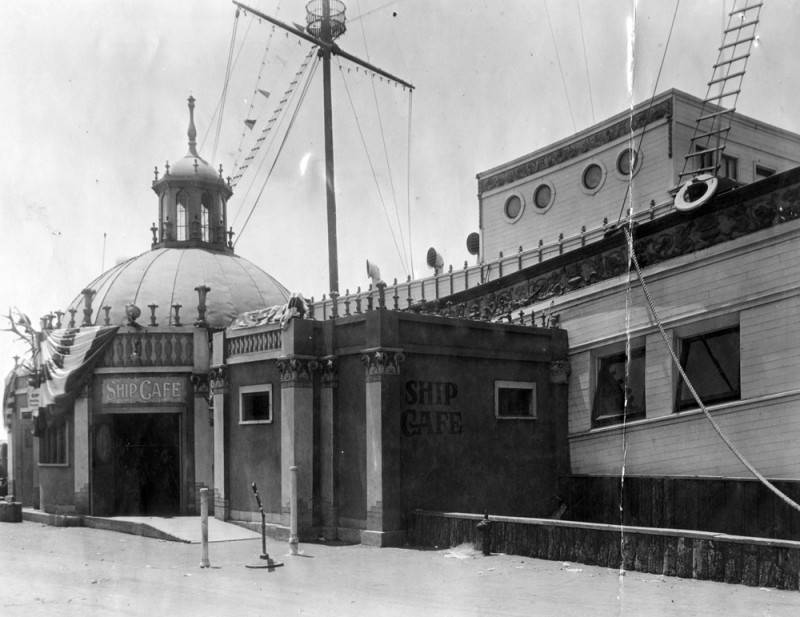
Ship Cafe entrance, photographed July 23, 1928, for a Los Angeles Herald-Examiner story about the case against Albert Marco (Los Angeles Public Library photo 00106486)

Described in one history as "the glamor spot of the Los Angeles area, a stamping ground of Hollywood stars and directors when they were relaxing," the Ship Cafe was also famous as a nightclub hosting musical acts and dancing girls. For instance, during the Baron Long era, "Spanish dancers Addison Fowler and Ethyle Stewart, dubbed the 'Castles of the Coast' in comparison with ballroom dancers Vernon and Irene Castle, had a 50-week run at the Ship Cafe in 1918."

The Ship Cafe was where bootlegger and gambler Albert Marco shot two men one summer night, ultimately resulting in his incarceration and deportation. Movie cowboys Tom Mix and Art Acord supposedly "wrecked" the restaurant once because "they were sore at each other". Disgruntled actors once threw dinner rolls at controversial director and fellow Ship Cafe patron Erich von Stroheim.

Other notable patrons included actors Fatty Arbuckle, Charlie Chaplin, Doug Fairbanks, and Nat Goodwin, and boxers Jack Dempsey and Jim Jeffries. The Ship Cafe was said to be a second home for Buster Keaton's circle of Hollywood friends.

== Management ==
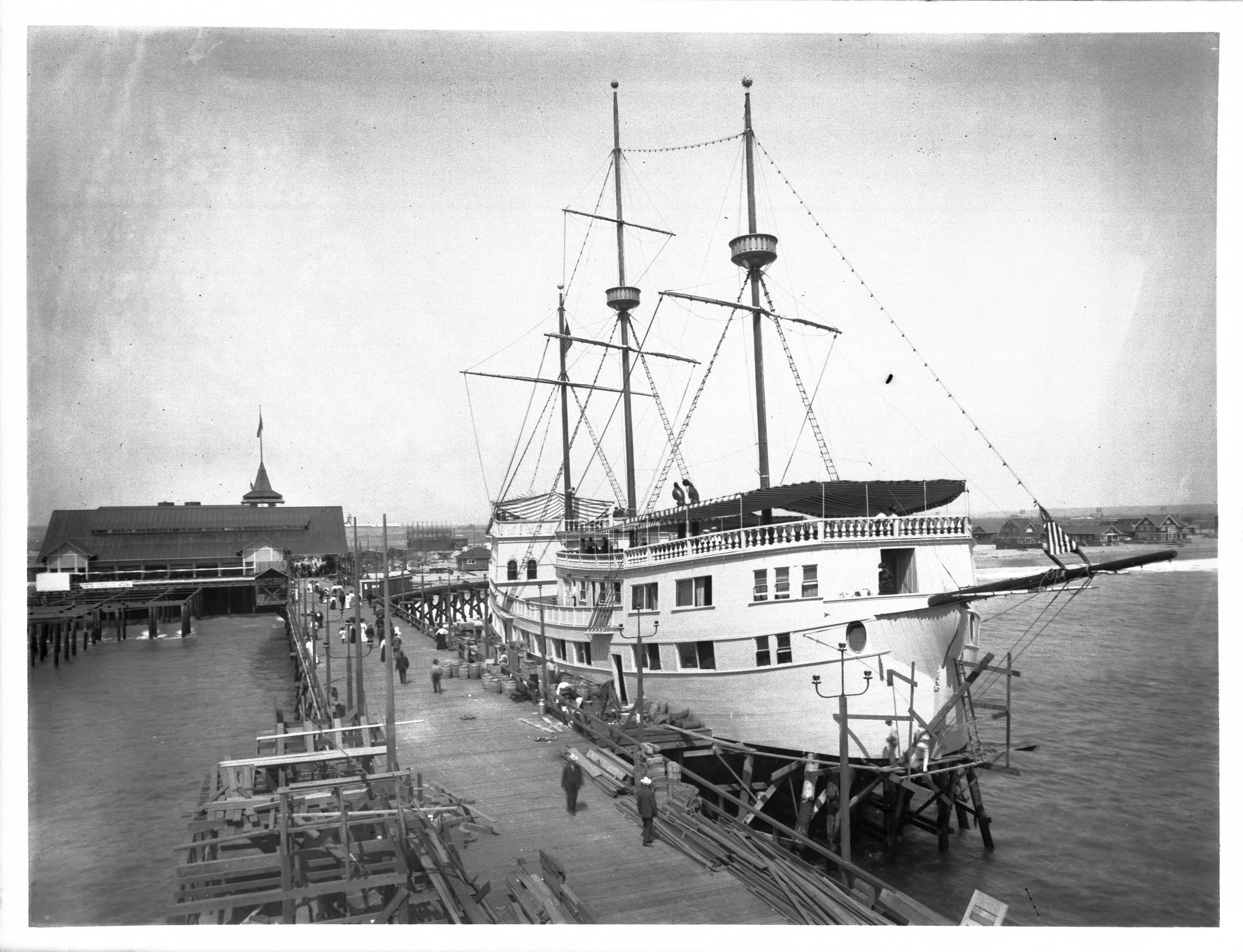
Ship Cafe with Venice Wharf and Pavilion in background, c. 1913

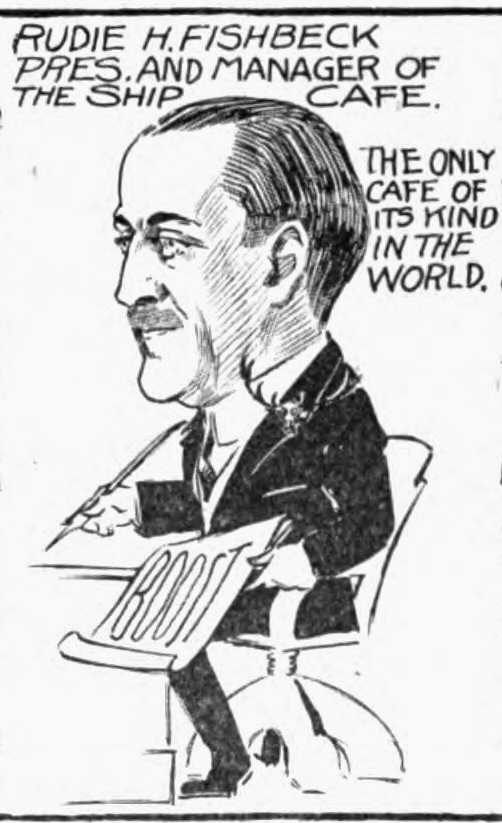
Caricature of Rudie H. Fishbeck, manager of the Ship Cafe, as published in Out West magazine, 1914

The Ship Cafe was owned and operated by a series of restaurateurs and businessmen over its 40-plus year history, including Marchetti, Tom McFadden and Jim Morjey, Baron Long, Tommy Jacobs, and Carleton Kinney, a son of the founder. Note: Name temporarily changed to Show-Boat Café (c. May 1929) and Volga Boat (late 1929 to fall 1930).

- Carlo Marchetti – Marchetti, the first operator of the Ship Cafe, was accused of embezzling profits, operating slot machines, and "allowing the private dining areas to be used for illicit activities".
- Ward McFadden – 1910 to 1913
- Rudy Fishbeck – 1913 to 1914
- Charles Shaw, Julius Miller, and John H. Gagliardo – from 1914
- Baron Long, Paul Schecnk, and Julius Rosenfeld – 1917 to 1920
- J. M. Covington, Covington's Ship Cafe – 1920 to 1922
- William Paine and Morris Rauch – after April 1922
- Peter Murich and George A. Baker Jr. – 1928
- Ralph Arnold – 1929
- Tommy Jacobs, George Collins, and Carter DeHaven – 1932 through 1938
- Thomas Cooney – dates unknown
- Joseph Prada – dates unknown
