= Illustrated Daily News =

20th-century Los Angeles newspaper

Daily News
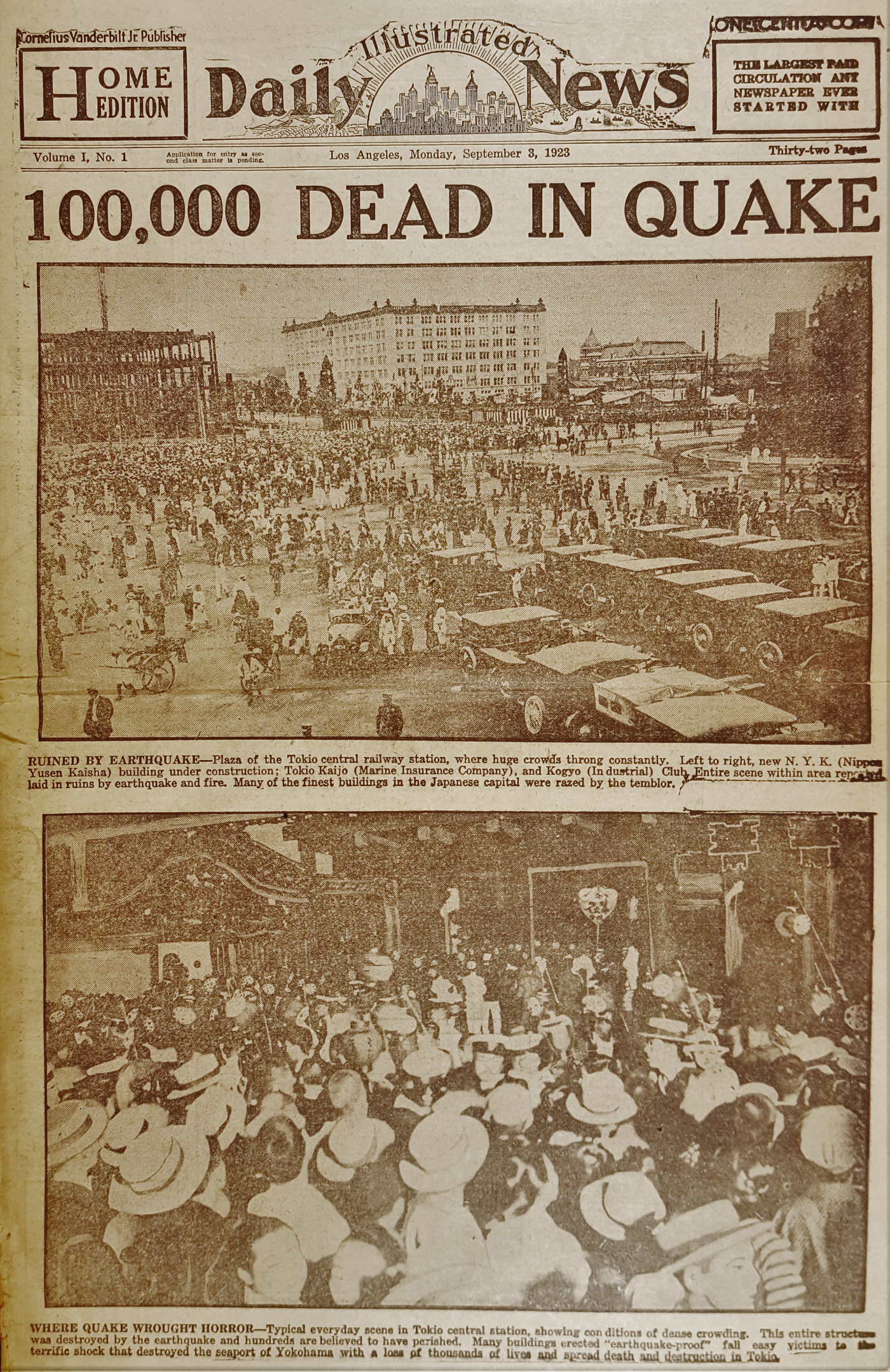
- First day's edition of the Illustrated Daily News, September 3, 1923, reporting on the Great Kantō earthquake in Japan
- Type: Daily newspaper
- Publisher: Cornelius Vanderbilt IV, Manchester Boddy, Illustrated Daily News Pub. Co.
- Founded: 1923
- Ceased publication: 1954
- Political alignment: Democratic
- Language: American English
- Headquarters: 1257 S. Los Angeles St. Los Angeles, California
- OCLC number: 26716041
- Free online archives: cdnc.ucr.edu (1923-1954)

The Daily News (originally the Illustrated Daily News) was a newspaper published in Los Angeles from 1923 to 1954. It was founded in 1923 by Cornelius Vanderbilt IV and bought by Manchester Boddy who operated it through most of its existence.

The Daily News was founded in 1923 by Vanderbilt as the first of several newspapers he wanted to manage. After quickly going into receivership, it was sold to Boddy, a businessman with no newspaper experience. Boddy was able to make the newspaper succeed, and it remained profitable through the 1930s and 1940s, taking a Democratic perspective at a time when most Los Angeles newspapers supported the Republican Party.

The newspaper began a steep decline in the late 1940s, continuing into the early 1950s. In 1950, Boddy ran in both the Democratic and Republican primaries for the United States Senate. He finished a distant second in each, and lost interest in the newspaper. He sold his stake in the paper in 1952 and, after changes in ownership, ceased publication in December 1954; the business was sold to the Chandler family, who merged it with their publication, the Los Angeles Mirror, firing all Daily News employees without severance pay.

== Founding and initial insolvency ==
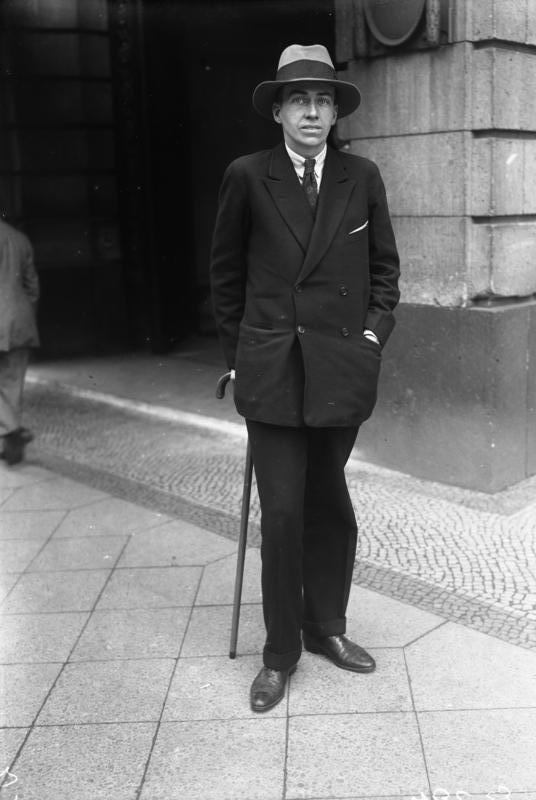
Vanderbilt in 1926

The Illustrated Daily News was founded in 1923 in Los Angeles by Cornelius Vanderbilt IV, who wished to start his own newspaper chain. The young Vanderbilt had served as a news reporter in New York for four years, but had no experience running a paper. Believing the best newspaper was a democratic one, he offered stock to those who would pay $5 for a year's subscription to his newspaper, with the right to elect two of the five directors. Repudiating the legendary adage of his great-grandfather William Henry Vanderbilt, "The public be damned," Cornelius Vanderbilt announced that the paper's philosophy would be "The public be served." Vanderbilt refused to lead the lifestyle of the idle rich—he had enlisted as a private during World War I—and believed the West Coast, with its increasing population, would become as important to the United States as the East Coast had been. A family friend, Lord Northcliffe, founder of Britain's Daily Mail, encouraged Vanderbilt to start a chain of serious-minded tabloids in the West, a contrast to Northcliffe's own racy newspapers. Vanderbilt loved the "swift, jazzy" tabloid format, but did not care for the sensationalism often paired with tabloid newspapers: he wanted to start one that would cost a cent and could, as he put it, "safely enter any home".

Vanderbilt ignored attempts by the newspaper moguls who dominated Los Angeles journalism, William Randolph Hearst and Harry Chandler, to discourage him. Chandler warned him not to start another paper; Hearst tried to hire him to run a tabloid he planned to start in New York City. Vanderbilt ignored them, but found that billboard companies would not give him space. Denied advertising in other newspapers, Vanderbilt attempted to gain publicity for his paper by having trucks drive through the streets bearing the paper's banner and hiring boys to chalk the paper's name on sidewalks, much to the annoyance of landowners who had to clean it up. He bought a former automobile showroom at the corner of Pico Boulevard and Los Angeles Street and furnished it with the latest printing equipment, including two presses (a third was soon added when circulation exceeded expectations). Although downtown, this was further south than the other papers. As Vanderbilt prepared for an August 1923 opening (pushed back to the following month), potential investors toured the building, attracted by high-pressure sales tactics and the promise of a free lunch.

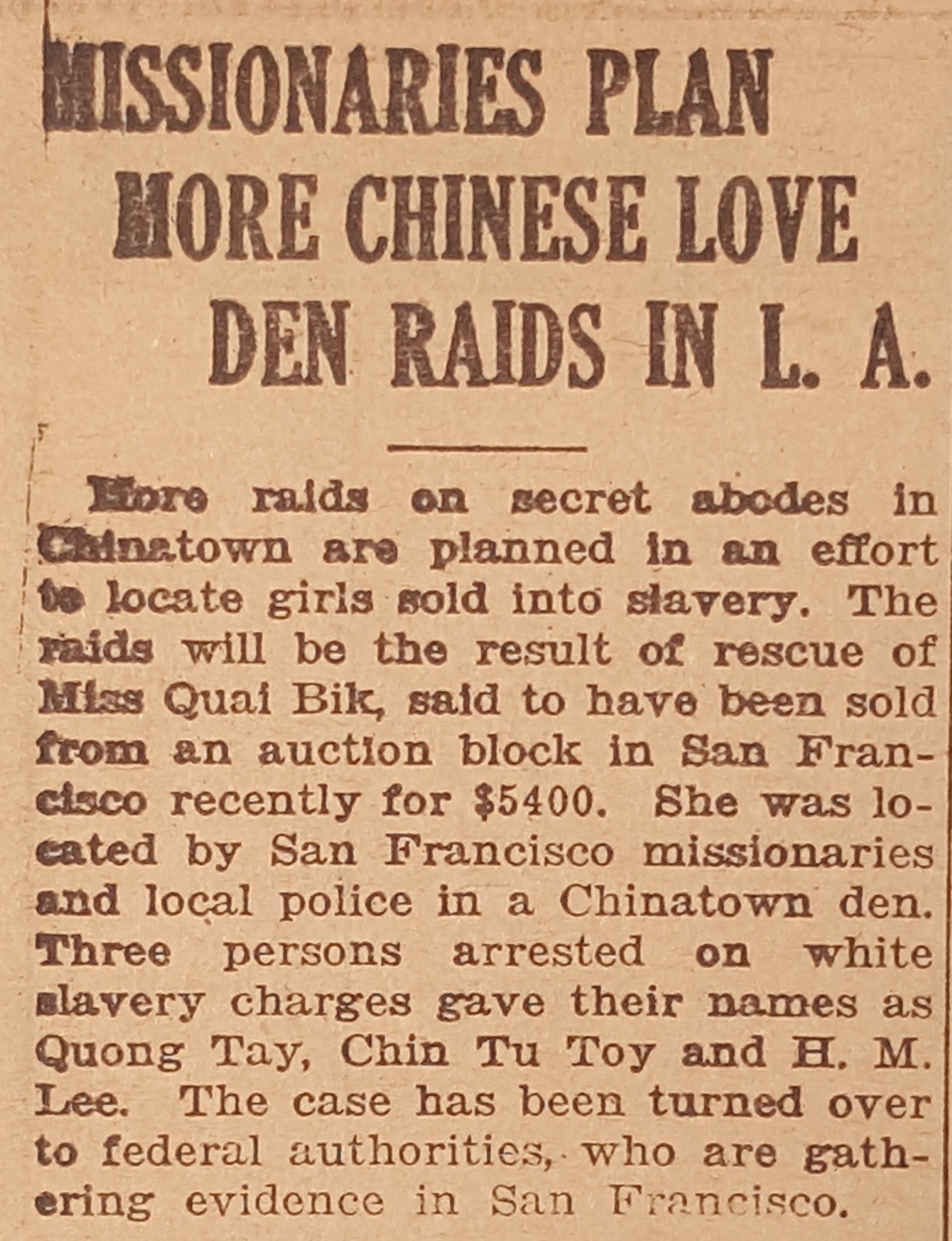
Story from the first edition, September 3, 1923

Unusually for Los Angeles at the time, the paper's plant was a union shop, something Vanderbilt insisted on. The paper began publication on September 3, 1923, and was helped in its launch by the fact that the Great Tokyo Earthquake had just happened; it was able to provide full coverage, though using stock photographs of Japan. The initial price was one cent a copy. The tabloid format newspaper was to be devoted to the ideal of clean journalism and was prudish to an extreme: women's skirts were retouched in photos to cover the knees, while photos of wrestlers were altered so they appeared to be wearing shirts. Vanderbilt's rivals did not take well to the new competition—saboteurs planted a graphic sex story about Charlie Chaplin in the first edition, forcing Vanderbilt, at considerable expense, to stop the presses and redo Page Two before it was published. Up to a hundred Illustrated Daily News newsboys were treated at local hospitals each week after being assaulted. Nevertheless, in December 1923 Vanderbilt expanded to San Francisco with the Illustrated Daily Herald and in February 1925 to Miami—the Illustrated Daily Tab was intended to cash in on the Florida land boom.

The newspaper paid for its staff's transportation, something rare at the time. Reporters were expected to carry rolls of nickels, so they could board streetcars and reach their assignments; if they had sufficient money with them, a taxicab was permitted, and Vanderbilt—"Neil" to the staff—let them use his two Packards to reach stories. Too often the least experienced newsman, Vanderbilt himself, would cover major stories. According to Rob Wagner in his history of Los Angeles newspapers of the time, Vanderbilt's "news stories reeked of naiveté and his editorials were sophomoric." Vanderbilt instructed his reporters to look for human interest stories other papers might overlook; one headline read, "FOUR HUNDRED CHICKENS DISAPPEAR". Among Vanderbilt's editorial targets was the Pacific Electric Railway—the paper deemed its streetcars a danger to pedestrians and termed them "red reapers".

By 1924, the newspaper had a good circulation but was losing money because of low advertising revenues. Vanderbilt sought help from his parents, and they agreed to help if most authority went to their hand-picked manager, Harvey Johnson. His father poured over a million dollars into the newspaper in 1924–1925, but Johnson's involvement led to a rightward shift in the newspaper, which alienated many readers. In April 1926, Johnson concluded that the Illustrated Daily News and the two other newspapers could survive with fresh investment of $300,000, but Vanderbilt's father refused to provide any more money. A petition for receivership was filed on May 3, 1926. Of the chain's three newspapers, the Daily News was deemed the most salvageable—the other two closed within weeks.

== Boddy takes over ==
Following the filing of the petition for receivership in 1926, a consortium of the publishers of the other Los Angeles newspapers offered $150,000 for the Illustrated Daily News, intending to shut it down. Los Angeles businessman Willis Lewis had invested heavily in the paper, and he put together a rival bid backed by the paper's outside shareholders, supporting book publishing executive Manchester Boddy to take over the paper and keep it as a going concern. The Vanderbilt family was willing to sign over a $1 million note to the Boddy consortium to keep the paper going, and the stockholders' committee raised $30,000 for a month's payroll. Boddy and Lewis both served on the Commercial Board, a group of young businessmen. The new publisher got Board members to lend him $116,000 to buy a controlling interest in the paper, but if the paper did not show a profit within six months, the lenders could repossess. Boddy, who used other people's money to purchase the newspaper, once commented, "The Daily News was conceived in iniquity, born in bankruptcy, reared in panic, and refinanced every six months." (Note: Hearst's mistress, Marion Davies, wrote in her 1975 memoirs that 51% of the Daily News was actually owned by Hearst, a fact kept secret lest he be known to be circumventing against owning rival newspapers in the same market. She said Hearst owned it without interfering as a means of protecting his Los Angeles Herald Examiner.)

The Daily News building, as illustrated in its first issue, September 3, 1923

The new publisher scrapped Vanderbilt's prudish policies and began a campaign against vice, spearheaded by reporter Gene Coughlin and directed against local gang boss Albert Marco. The Los Angeles police had a hands-off policy when it came to vice and organized crime. Most local reporters valued the perks given to them by the police and did nothing to push the issue. After Boddy began a crusade against crime and corruption, he weathered harassment by police and politicians, but circulation rose. In the pages of the Daily News, Boddy fought against the "L.A. System", entrenched graft in the city's government, to the profit of many policemen, politicians, and organized crime figures, under the leadership of Charles H. Crawford. Police chief James E. Davis wanted to have Boddy prosecuted for promoting illegal gambling by publishing horse race entries and results, as betting on horse races was then illegal in California. The district attorney's office chose to take no action, and Boddy later successfully advocated for a repeal of the ban, leading to the establishments of California tracks such as Santa Anita and Hollywood Park. Boddy also streamlined operations and stabilized the paper's management.

Boddy, each day, wrote a front-page editorial espousing his views. His newspaper gave its reader a steady diet of coverage of celebrities, sports, and gossip, with illustrations of pro wrestlers and women in bathing suits. Boddy mocked Hearst and Chandler in his pages, and often embarrassed the powerful, once displaying a photograph of a city official picking his nose. By 1929, the Daily News was showing a profit, and three years later, amid the Depression, began publishing a broadsheet edition, raising its price from two to three cents. Boddy said that with a circulation of 150,000, the paper was profitable even without advertising. By 1932, Boddy had dropped the word "Illustrated" from the name of the paper.

== Prewar years ==
During the first six years of Boddy's ownership, the Daily News maintained a conservative editorial policy. He was a personal supporter of President Herbert Hoover's bid for reelection in 1932. Los Angeles newspaper owners met and decided that, as all newspaper owners were supporting Hoover, one paper had to support the Democratic candidate, New York Governor Franklin Roosevelt, and Boddy and the Daily News volunteered for the job. The day after the presidential election, which saw Roosevelt elected in a landslide, Boddy turned to his city editor and said of the voters: "They have made a terrible mistake. I helped them do it. But damn it, I had to make a living."

After Roosevelt's election, the nation waited with anticipation for the specifics of the "New Deal" plan on which he had campaigned. Boddy had no more information than anyone else, but had been impressed by a program called "technocracy", which proposed replacing politicians with scientists and engineers possessing the technical expertise to coordinate the economy, a scheme Roosevelt did not advocate. On November 30, 1932, the Daily News printed a huge headline "New Deal Details Bared". The article contained no inside information, and actually did not even mention Roosevelt, but instead outlined technocracy. He continued to discuss technocracy for weeks, as the people of Los Angeles, desperate for plausible information from any source, bought copies of the Daily News, even invading the paper's loading dock to get them as quickly as possible. Even after Roosevelt took office, the Daily News trumpeted proposals to give money to the nation's citizens, such as Francis Townsend's plan that the federal government give $200 a month to every citizen over age 60. The Daily News also gave space to the "Ham 'n' Eggs" plan whereby the elderly would get checks for $30 every Thursday. Boddy hit the lecture circuit to advocate social credit, another plan for the government to return taxes to the citizenry.

When the New Deal finally was brought forth, Boddy became an avid supporter of it, and so did his newspaper, making it the only Democratic daily in Los Angeles. In 1934, writer Upton Sinclair ran for the Democratic nomination for governor, advocating the End Poverty in California (EPIC) program. When Sinclair scored a surprise upset victory in the Democratic primary against George Creel, most newspapers closed ranks against him and supported the Republican candidate, Frank Merriam. The Daily News, on the other hand, opened its front page to Sinclair's program and called him "a great man". Though the Daily News eventually endorsed Merriam, who was elected, its objection was not that the program was too radical, but that it was not consistent with the New Deal. This did not stop Sinclair from being embittered at what he saw as a betrayal by the Daily News, accusing Boddy of "leading liberal movements up blind alleys and bludgeoning them".

Boddy acquired the Los Angeles Record in 1935, changing its name to the Evening News. The two papers were subsequently merged under the Daily News name. Boddy's columns were so popular he secured a radio show on KFWB to read them over the air. In 1937, managing editor Matt Weinstock, who had been with the Daily News since being hired as a sports reporter in 1924, was faced with a vacancy when columnist E.V. Durling left for the Los Angeles Times. He took the job as columnist himself, soon giving up his managerial position, and wrote for the Daily News until it ceased publication in 1954.

== Decline and fall ==
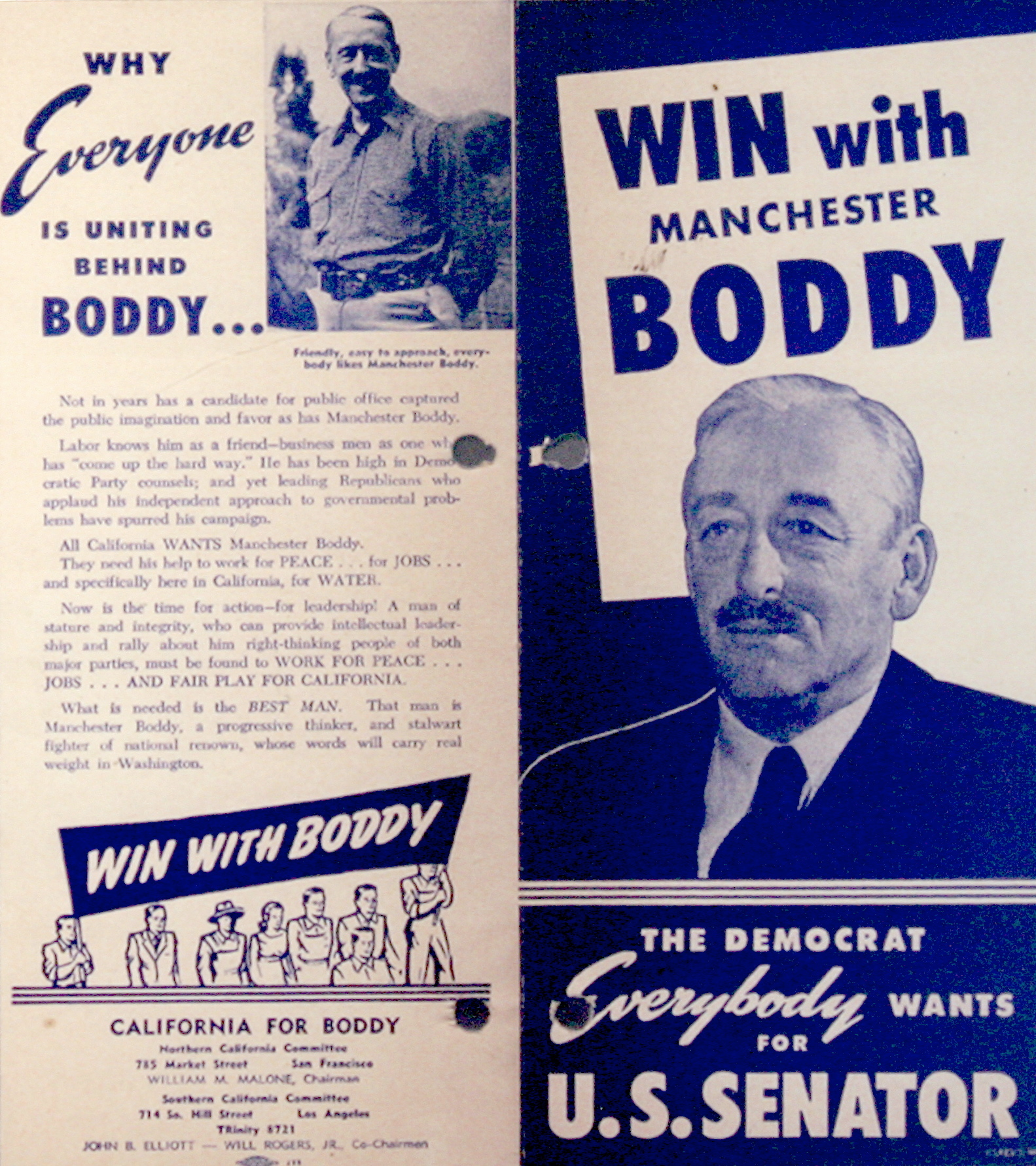
A flyer for Boddy's election campaign, which described him as "the Democrat everybody wants for U.S. senator"

Boddy had predicted World War II several years in advance. When war came, his desire to be a crusading journalist diminished, and he devoted more time to the camellias on his estate, Descanso. Like most newspapers, the Daily News prospered during the war. Pioneering photojournalist Helen Brush Jenkins got her start replacing her husband at the Daily News when he went to war. She did so well there was no vacancy for him when he returned, and she kept her job there for 12 years, in 1951 capturing the light of a nuclear test in Nevada from the roof of the Daily News building, a picture dubbed, "Atomic Dawn". While there were woman journalists at other Los Angeles dailies during the war, they followed a path already broken by women at the Daily News, which also employed minorities such as Latino night editor Sparky Saldana and his brother, sportswriter Lupe Saldana.

Until the war, the Daily News had been published on peach-colored paper; when it changed back from white afterwards, the paper held a parade through downtown entitled "The Peach is Back!" and tossed peaches to onlookers. Daily News readership peaked in 1947, when an average 300,000 copies per day were sold. In both absolute and relative terms, though, it was falling further and further behind the other Los Angeles dailies, such as the Times and Los Angeles Examiner. In addition, Boddy, who was now past sixty, was losing interest in managing the paper. Fierce competition from the new Chandler family tabloid, the Los Angeles Mirror, also hurt circulation and profits. Nevertheless, Boddy advanced money to keep the paper in business, lending nearly $2 million to fund its operations between 1948 and 1952, funds for which he did not seek repayment in the paper's subsequent bankruptcy. The Daily News was the only Democratic newspaper in Los Angeles in the postwar years, featuring columns by Eleanor Roosevelt and Drew Pearson, with cartoons by Herb Block.

In 1950, feeling he was repeating himself in print, Boddy sought another way to involve himself in public affairs by running for the Democratic nomination for United States Senate. Boddy was tapped to enter the race when incumbent Sheridan Downey dropped out during the primary. Democratic establishment figures distrusted the remaining major Democratic candidate, liberal Representative Helen Gahagan Douglas, and feared that a Douglas victory would hand the election to the likely Republican candidate, Congressman Richard M. Nixon. Daily News staffers believed Boddy was abandoning his journalistic integrity in running. Boddy ran in both major party primaries, a practice known as "cross filing", but his campaign was ineffective, and he finished a distant second in each primary. During the campaign, he mocked Douglas's liberal views by dubbing her "the pink lady" in the Daily News, a nickname reused by the Nixon campaign in the general election. Just before the primary, when Nixon (who along with Douglas had also cross-filed) sent out election materials that did not mention he was a Republican, an ad appeared in the Daily News from the hitherto-unknown "Veterans Democratic Committee". The advertisement accused Nixon of masquerading as a Democrat, and dubbed him "Tricky Dick"—the first appearance of that Nixon moniker. Nixon went on to win the general election over Douglas in a landslide.

After the primary defeat, Boddy went into semi-retirement, and profits from sales of the Daily News began to decrease. In early 1951, he made his assistant, Robert Smith, editor of the paper, and in mid-1952, sold out to a consortium led by Smith. In August 1952, Boddy announced his retirement as publisher in Smith's favor. Smith instituted changes, substituting a Sunday News for the money-losing Saturday edition. He called in William Townes as editor, who was well known for restoring ailing newspapers, but Smith fired Townes after twelve weeks on the job. Smith attempted to sell the paper, and reached an agreement with a small-time Oregon newspaper owner, Sheldon F. Sackett. After signing, Smith backed out of the deal. By the time Smith finally sold the paper, in December 1952 to Congressman Clinton D. McKinnon, who was leaving office after losing a Senate primary bid, the Daily News was losing over $100,000 a month.

In May 1953, the Daily News dropped the Sunday edition, changed from being an afternoon paper to morning, and cut its price from ten cents to seven. McKinnon related that he had been approached by labor leaders who wanted to keep the Daily News in business, but after the paper was purchased, much of their support failed to materialize. He went to "every wealthy liberal person I ever heard of", seeking money to keep the paper in business. He was able to increase circulation by 20,000 and halve the annual million dollar loss. Nevertheless, creditors pressed for repayment of debt, and in December 1954, the paper was sold to the Chandler family, owners of the Mirror. Under the sale agreement, the Mirror became the Mirror & Daily News (before again being renamed the Mirror-News). On December 18, 1954, publication of the Daily News ceased and all employees lost their jobs without severance pay. The unionized workforce lost their jobs just before Christmas. At its end, the Daily News was a six-column large tabloid and had a circulation of 195,000, published every day but Sunday. Subsequent bankruptcy proceedings revealed that Boddy, Smith, and McKinnon each took large losses in the paper's final years.

== Legacy ==
Cecilia Rasmussen of the Los Angeles Times wrote in 2004, how "For nearly three decades, the Illustrated Daily News—later just the Daily News—used its peach-colored tabloid pages to champion the downtrodden and castigate political graft and vice." Jack Smith, who wrote for the Daily News and was later a columnist for the Times, remembered, "it may be that few of us were perfectly sober when we put the Daily News to bed, but it was a wonderful paper, full of humor, youthful energy, good writing and irreverence." An article in the later publication of the same name, the Los Angeles Daily News, stated of its predecessor, "While the Daily News' circulation never rivaled the Times or Examiner, its breezy approach to the news definitely had an impact on L.A. journalism." The Christian Science Monitor's West Coast correspondent, Richard Dyer MacCann, stated when the Daily News folded,

The surprise for most observers has been the staying power of this independent daily with its inadequate staff, its worn-out presses, and its fluctuating circulation and advertising income in face of rising costs. Being constantly in the throes of political debate among the various wings of the Democratic Party, the News nevertheless had many thousands of loyal supporters who felt the need of an opposition newspaper in Los Angeles.
