= Timeline of piers of Los Angeles County =

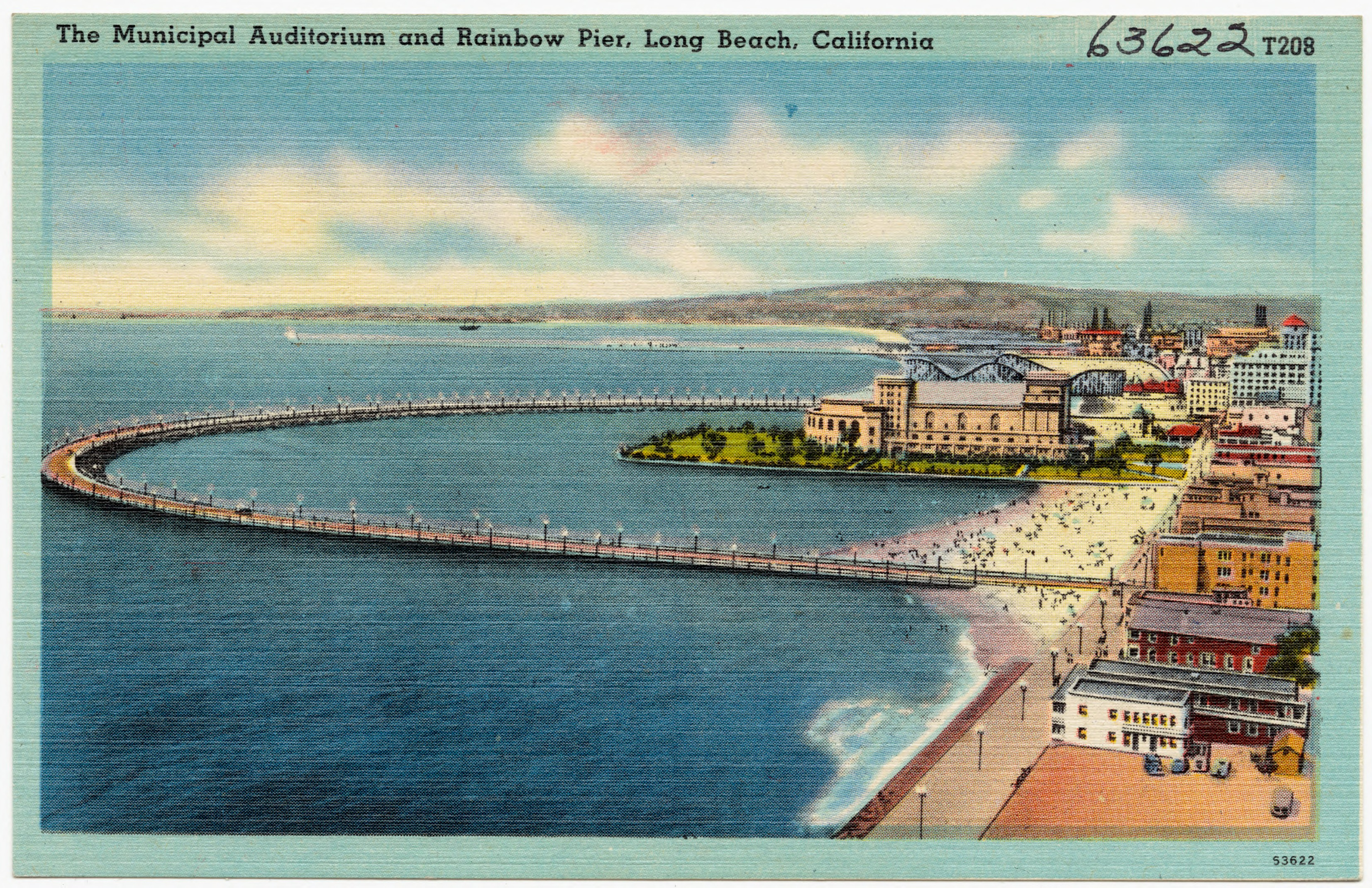
Long Beach Municipal Auditorium and the Rainbow Pier, Long Beach, California, linen-era postcard by Tichnor Bros., produced c. 1930–1945

This is a timeline of piers of Los Angeles County, California, United States, including dates of construction and demolition, and notable events. This list does not currently cover piers and wharves of the Port of Los Angeles on San Pedro Bay or piers in neighboring Orange County (part of Los Angeles County until 1889) at Seal Beach, Laguna Beach, Huntington Beach, etc.

Timeline of piers of Los Angeles County
Date	Event
1897	Abbot Kinney and Francis Ryan build the first Ocean Park Pier.
May 1908	Construction begins on the Santa Monica Municipal Pier
September 9, 1909	Santa Monica Municipal Pier opens to the public
September 3, 1912	1912 Ocean Park pier fire destroys Fraser's Million Dollar Pier and several square blocks of Ocean Park
May 24, 1913	Long Beach pier auditorium disaster kills more than 30 people at the Pine Avenue Pier in Long Beach
December 27, 1915	1915 Ocean Park pier fire damages Fraser's Ocean Park pier
1916	Looff's Pleasure Pier and Santa Monica Looff Hippodrome constructed adjacent to Santa Monica Municipal Pier
December 20, 1920	Abbot Kinney pier fire
January 6, 1924	1924 Ocean Park pier fire destroys Pickering's Pier, Lick's Dome Pier, and Fraser's Pier
June 29, 1925	New Ocean Park Pier opens to the public

== List of piers in Los Angeles County ==
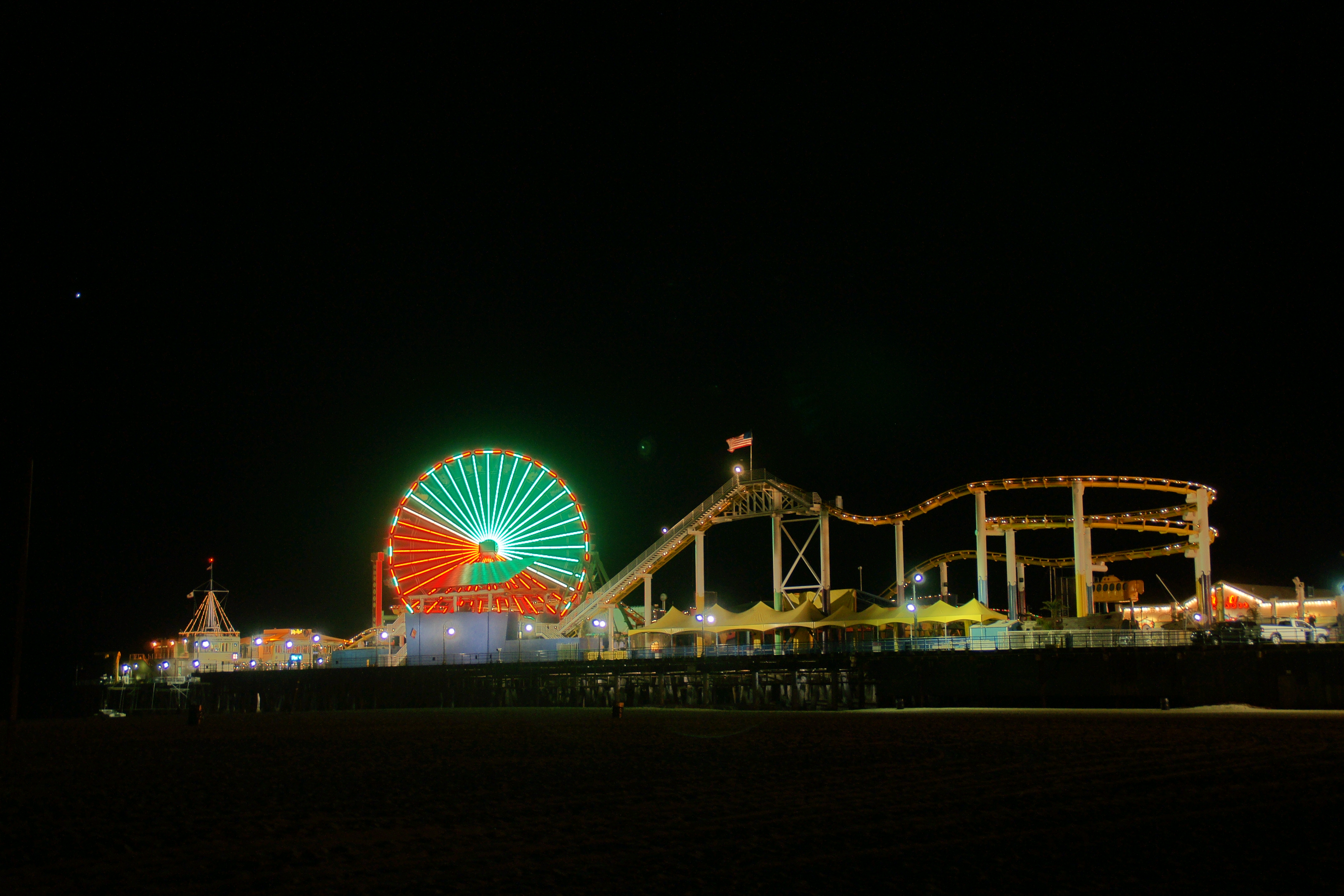
Santa Monica Pier at night (2008)

- Abbot Kinney Pier
- Crystal Pier
- Dome Pier
- G. M. Jones Pier
- Million Dollar Pier
- Horseshoe Pier and Pavilion
- The Long Wharf
- Looff Pleasure Pier
- Newcomb Pier
- Pickering's Pleasure Pier
- Pine Avenue Pier
- Rainbow Pier
- Santa Monica Pier
- Santa Monica Municipal Pier
- Venice Pier
- Venice Fishing Pier
