= Ocean Park pier fire =

Ocean Park pier fire refers to fires that occurred on or near amusement piers of Ocean Park, Los Angeles County, California, United States.

- 1912 Ocean Park pier fire
- 1915 Ocean Park pier fire
- 1924 Ocean Park pier fire
- Multiple 1970s Ocean Park pier fires (after closure but before demolition of Pacific Ocean Park)
