= Dome Pier =

U.S. amusement park (1922–1924)

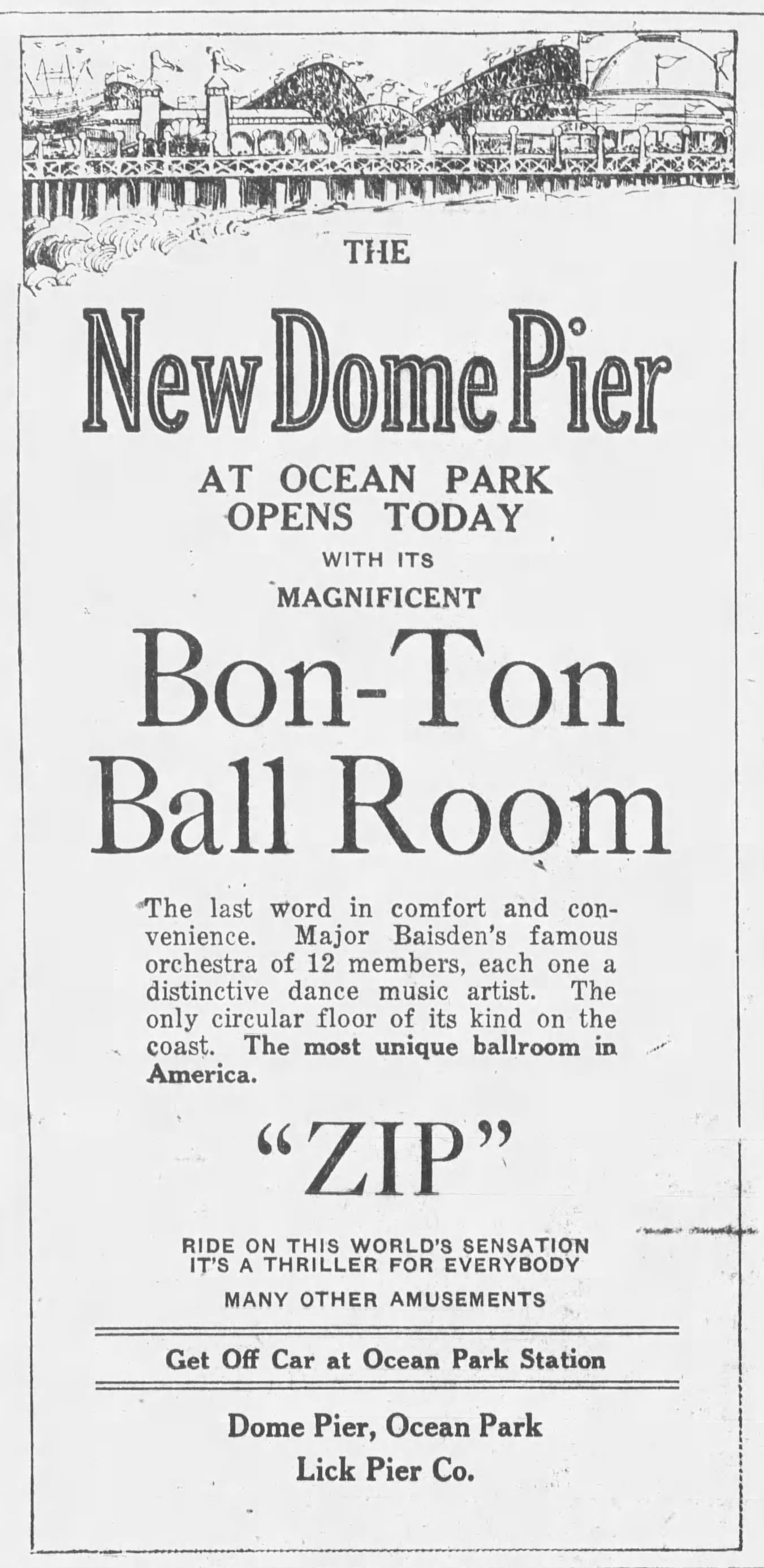
- Location: Navy Street, Ocean Park, Santa Monica, California
- Coordinates: 33.997°N 118.4827°W
- Owner: Charles J. Lick
- Operator: Austin McFadden (Bon-Ton Ballroom)

History
- Opening date: June 3, 1922
- Destruction date: January 6, 1924

The Dome Pier on the Pacific Ocean at Ocean Park, Los Angeles County, California, United States, stood from 1922 until it was destroyed in the 1924 Ocean Park pier fire. Built by businessman Charles J. Lick, the amusement pier was also known as Lick's Dome Pier and was home to the Dome Theater and Bon-Ton Ballroom. The pier stood on what was then the borderline between Venice and Santa Monica, with the pier being mostly in Venice "except for six feet of dressing room space" in the Dome Theater, which stood in Santa Monica.

== History ==
The Dome Pier proper opened on Saturday, June 3, 1922. The Dome Pier measured 1,500 feet (460 m) by 263 feet (80 m). The week of the pier's opening, it also was announced that the Dome Pier, Fraser's Ocean Park Pier, and Pickering's Pleasure Pier had been connected together into an amusement park that developers claimed was the biggest entertainment pier in the world. Featured attractions included the Zip roller coaster, Dodge'em, Caterpillar and Captive Aeroplane rides, and the Dome Theater, which was opened with a sneak preview of the film Trouble presented by child star Jackie Coogan. The Dome theater showed both films and vaudeville, running five shows a day on weekends. The musical accompaniment was provided by Lew Lewis' Famous Orchestra. The lobby was red and gold, with arched entryways, the lounge was blue and gold, the leather seats were "overstuffed," and there were no stairs to the balcony but rather a "slight incline".

The Bon-Ton Ballroom, which opened first, was a social dance hall and the work of an East Coast businessman named Austin McFadden. The ballroom included a dance school taught by Jack Connors and Bonnie Dunn; their specialties included the "caterpillar walk and Parisian foxtrot". The house band at the Bon-Ton Ballroom was led by Harry Baisden, and they often performed live for radio audiences on KFI and KHJ. When Baisden died in 1926, he was remembered as "one who won many friends in this community as a former leader of the Venice Ballroom orchestra".

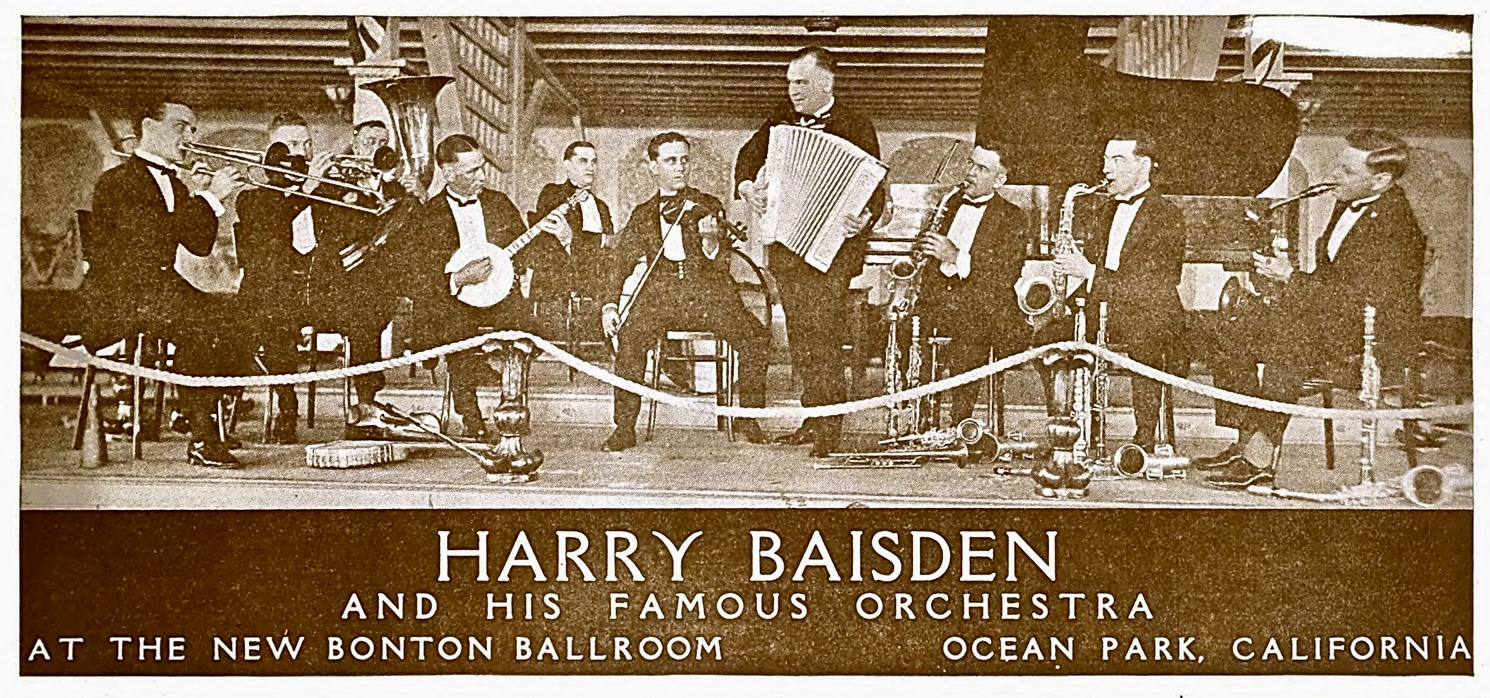
Harry Baisden and the His Famous Orchestra (Southern California Business, Sept. 1922)

A police raid in August 1923 revealed a secret illegal casino below the pier. According to one account, the gambling den was equipped like "a junior Monte Carlo concession. There was a door man who determined the authenticity of the various shibboleths, with a complete ceremony, it is asserted. Just how Contreras and his men were able to break through this barrier is not rtated, but it is known that it was after great difficulty and many weeks of careful manipulation". After the club had been raided four times, C. J. Lick announced that tenants of the "submarine garden" below the pier had always assured him that their operation was a legitimate pool hall, but given the circumstances he would not be renewing their lease.

The Dome Pier and her neighbors were destroyed in the Ocean Park pier fire that broke out on January 6, 1924. As the Los Angeles Times described it, "A vivid picture was effected in the destruction of the Dome Theater. The great dome flamed like an inverted cauldron as the tongues of fire ate through the rooting, and after the flammable material was destroyed, the huge, cement hemisphere puffed smoke into the air through a vent." Insurance premiums on highly flammable wooden entertainment piers were usually unaffordably high, so Lick had just $10,000 of insurance coverage on the pier, and McFadden had no insurance at all. Reconstruction began quickly, and the new Dome Pier, usually called the Lick Pier, opened in spring 1925.

=== Incidents ===
An 18-year-old from Los Angeles was killed on the Zip coaster in November 1922. According to a report in the Venice Vanguard, a young man seated in the front lost his balance while tugging on the guard rail and was thrown out of the car and onto the coaster tracks in front of the oncoming coaster vehicle. He did not survive his injuries.

== In popular culture ==
Scenes from Oh! What a Day!, a two-reel Universal comedy film featuring the Gump family, were filmed at the Lick's Dome Pier.

== Additional images ==
Lick's Dome Pier (1922–1924)
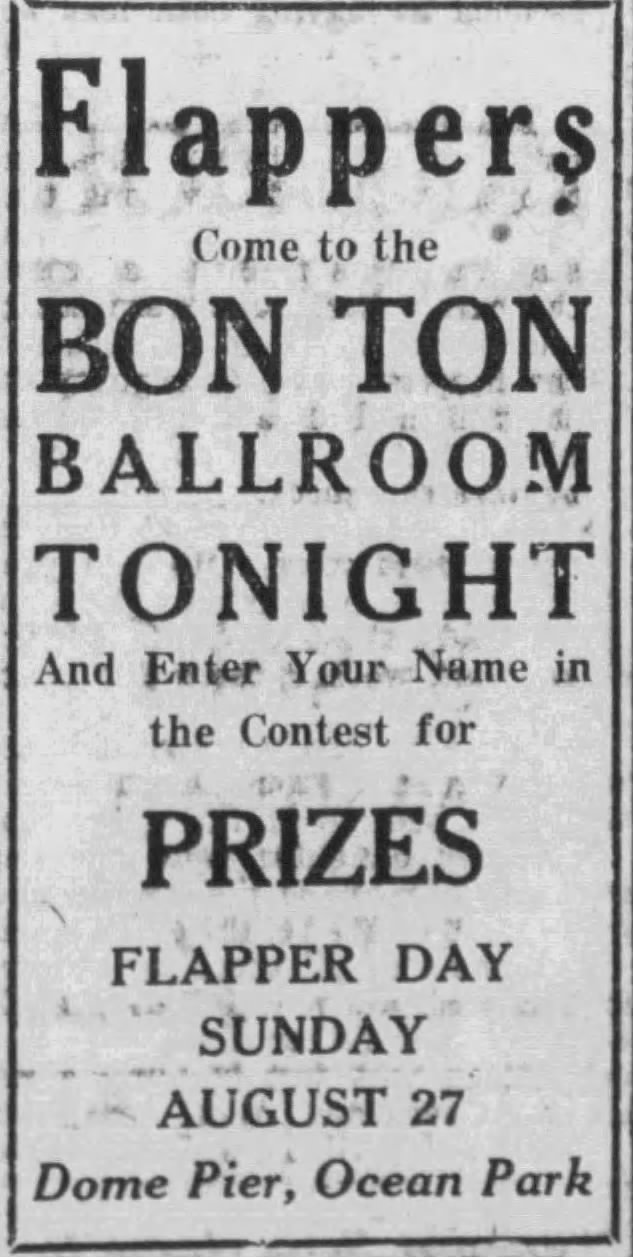
Flapper night at Bon-Ton Ballroom (Evening Vanguard, August 19, 1922)

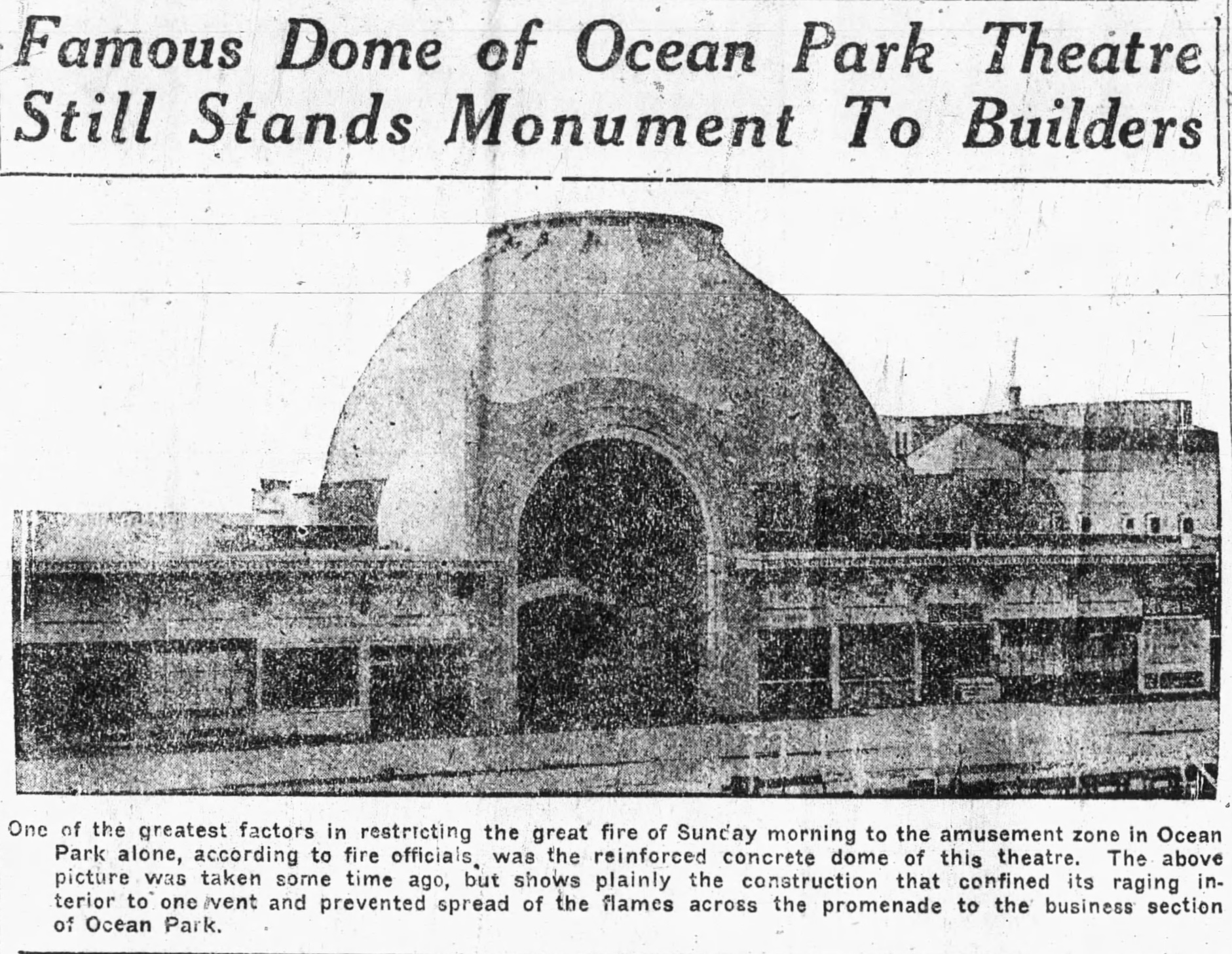
"Famous Dome of Ocean Park Theatre Still Stands Monument to Builders" (Evening Vanguard, January 8, 1924)

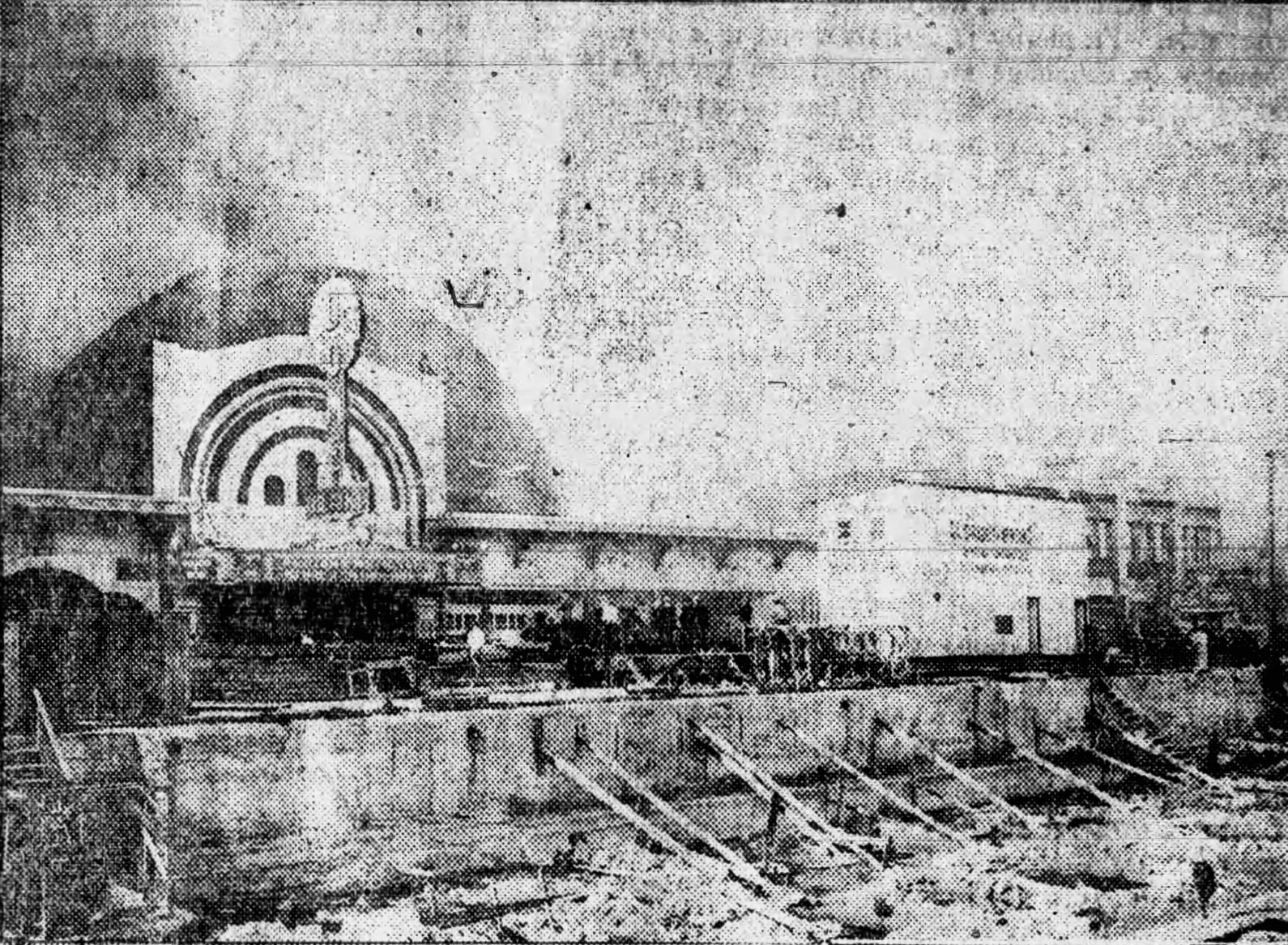
Dome Theater during 1924 Ocean Park pier fire

== See also ==
- Fraser's Million Dollar Pier
