= Million Dollar Pier =

Million Dollar Pier or Million-Dollar Pier may refer to:

- Million-Dollar Pier in Atlantic City, New Jersey - see ACX1 Studios
- Fraser's Million Dollar Pier, Ocean Park, California (1911–1912)
- Million Dollar Pier in St. Petersburg, Florida (1926–1967)
