= 1924 Ocean Park pier fire =

Event in California

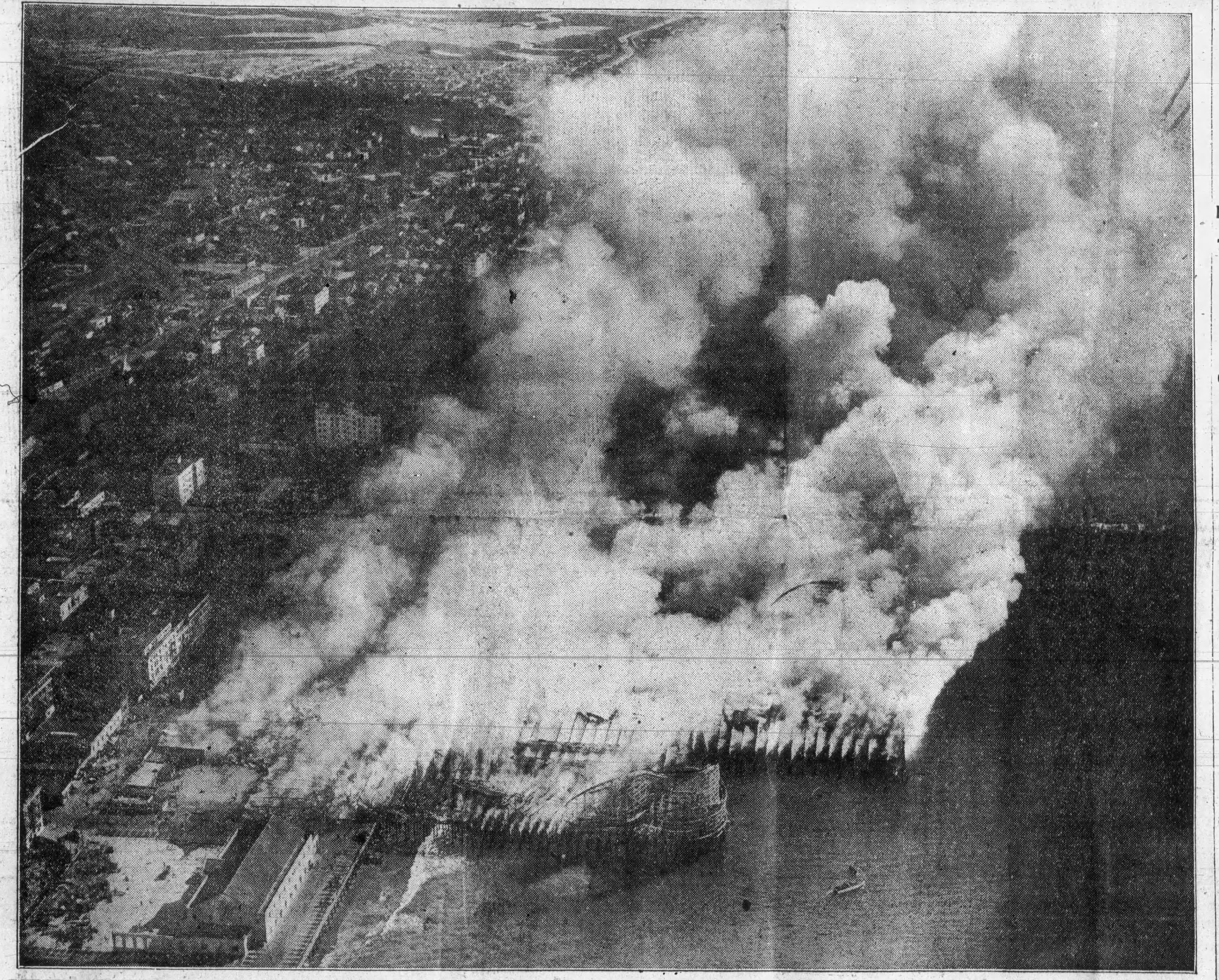
- 1924 Ocean Park pier fire aerial photograph taken from Clover Field plane
- Date: January 6, 1924
- Location: 33.997°N 118.4827°W

The 1924 Ocean Park fire destroyed several amusement piers and dance halls at Ocean Park, Los Angeles County, California, United States. The fire of Sunday, January 6, 1924, burned Pickering's Pier, Lick's Dome Pier, and Fraser's Pier, as well as the Dome Theater, Rosemary Theater, Bon Ton Dance Hall, and Giant Dipper roller coaster. In addition to the piers, the fire destroyed an apartment building, two novelty shops, and a drugstore. The fire, believed to have begun around 9:30 a.m. in a fish stand at the foot of Fraser's Pier, burned for about three hours before it was extinguished. Two people had to be rescued after they jumped in the ocean to escape the blaze, but there were no serious injuries. The blaze drew an estimated 75,000 spectators from neighboring communities.

== Additional images ==
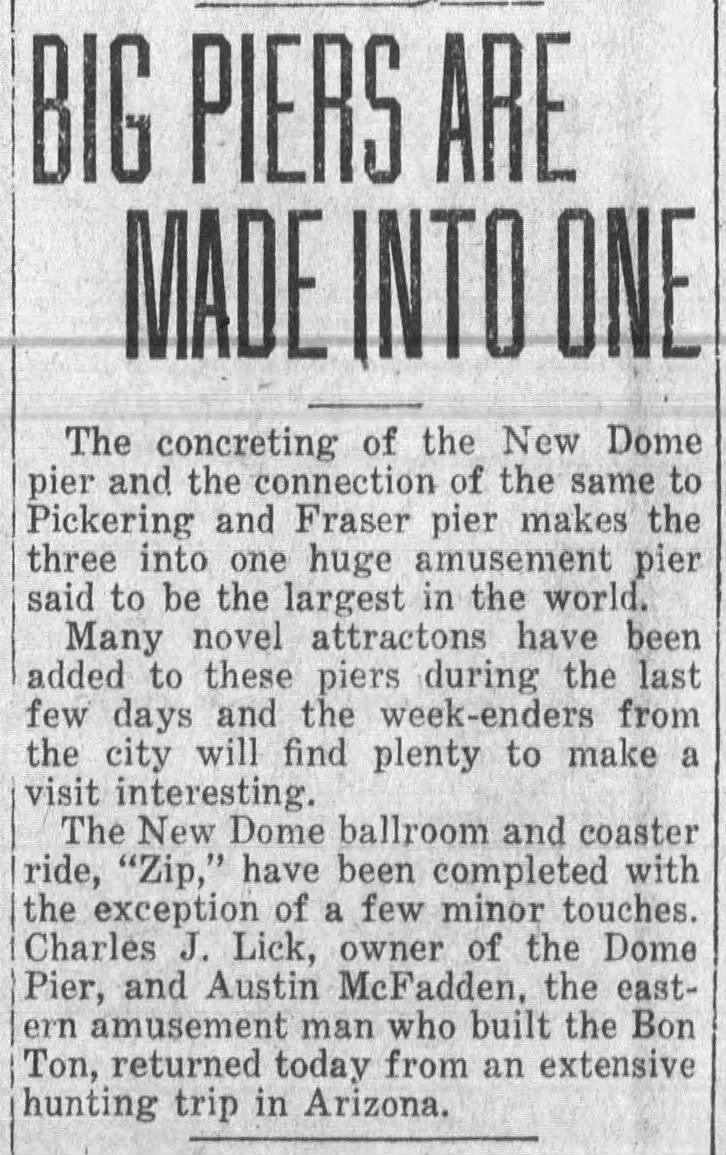
"Big Piers Are Made Into One" Evening Vanguard, June 10, 1922

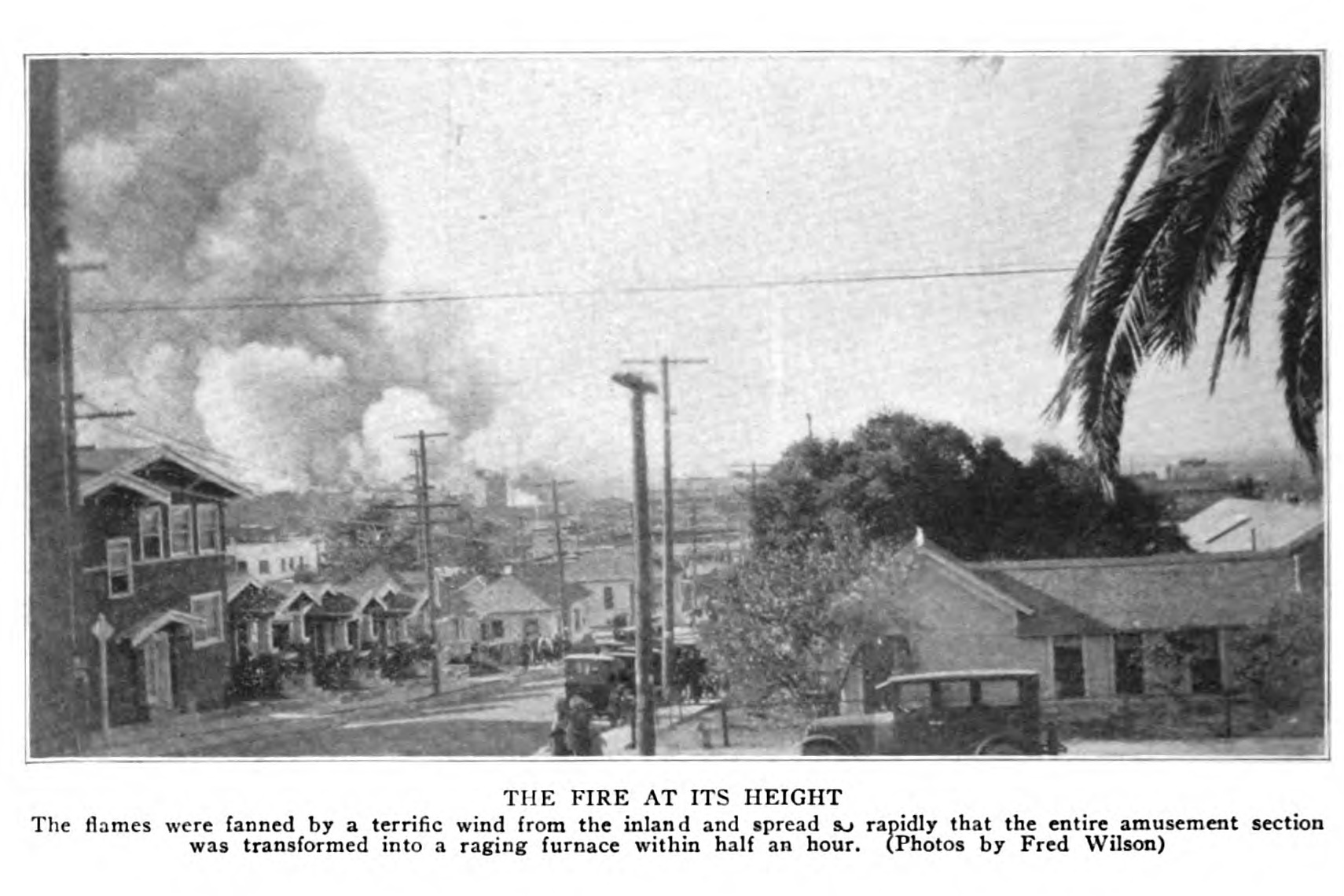
"Fire Again Destroys Famous Ocean Park Playground"

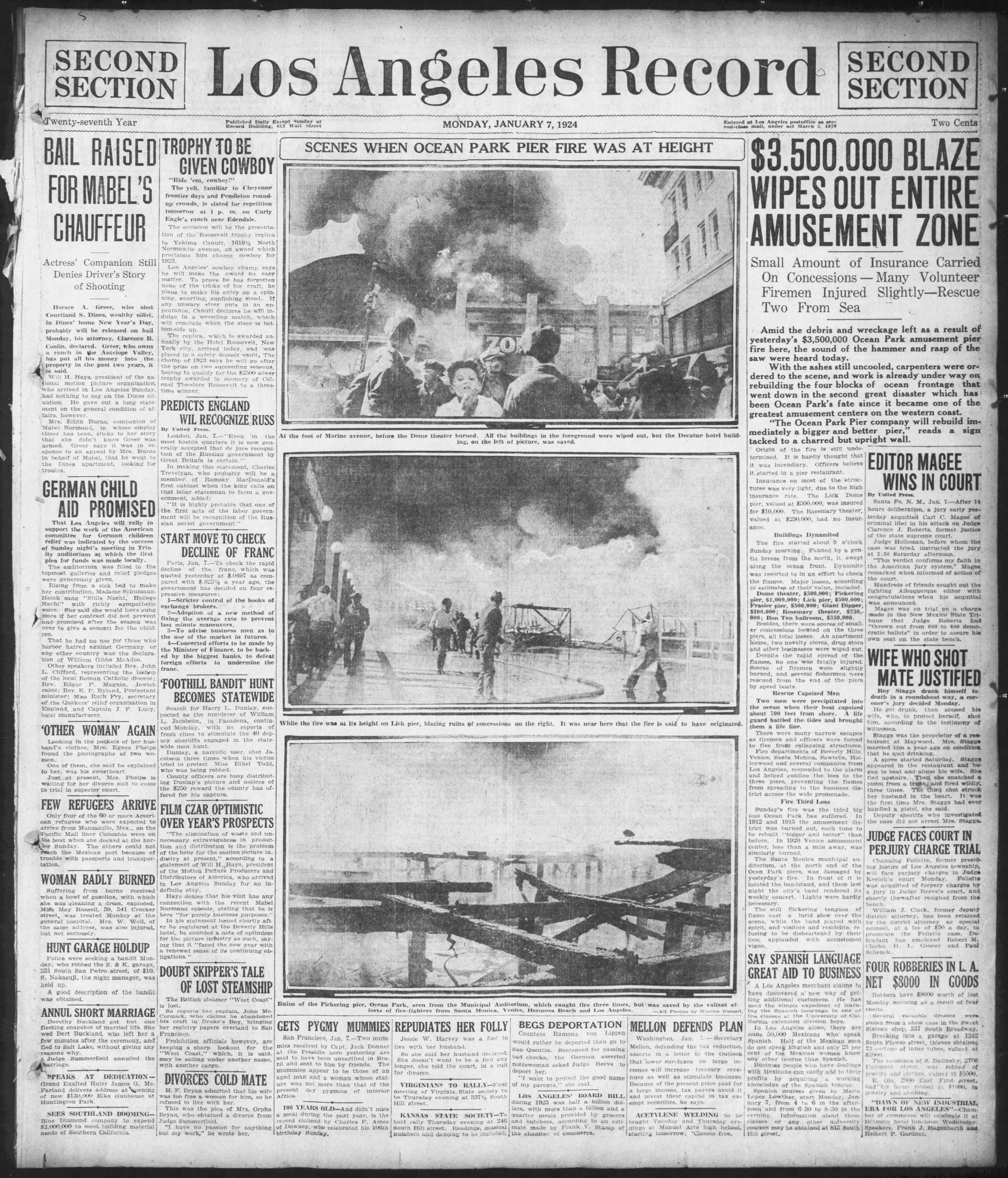
Los Angeles Record photos of the fire

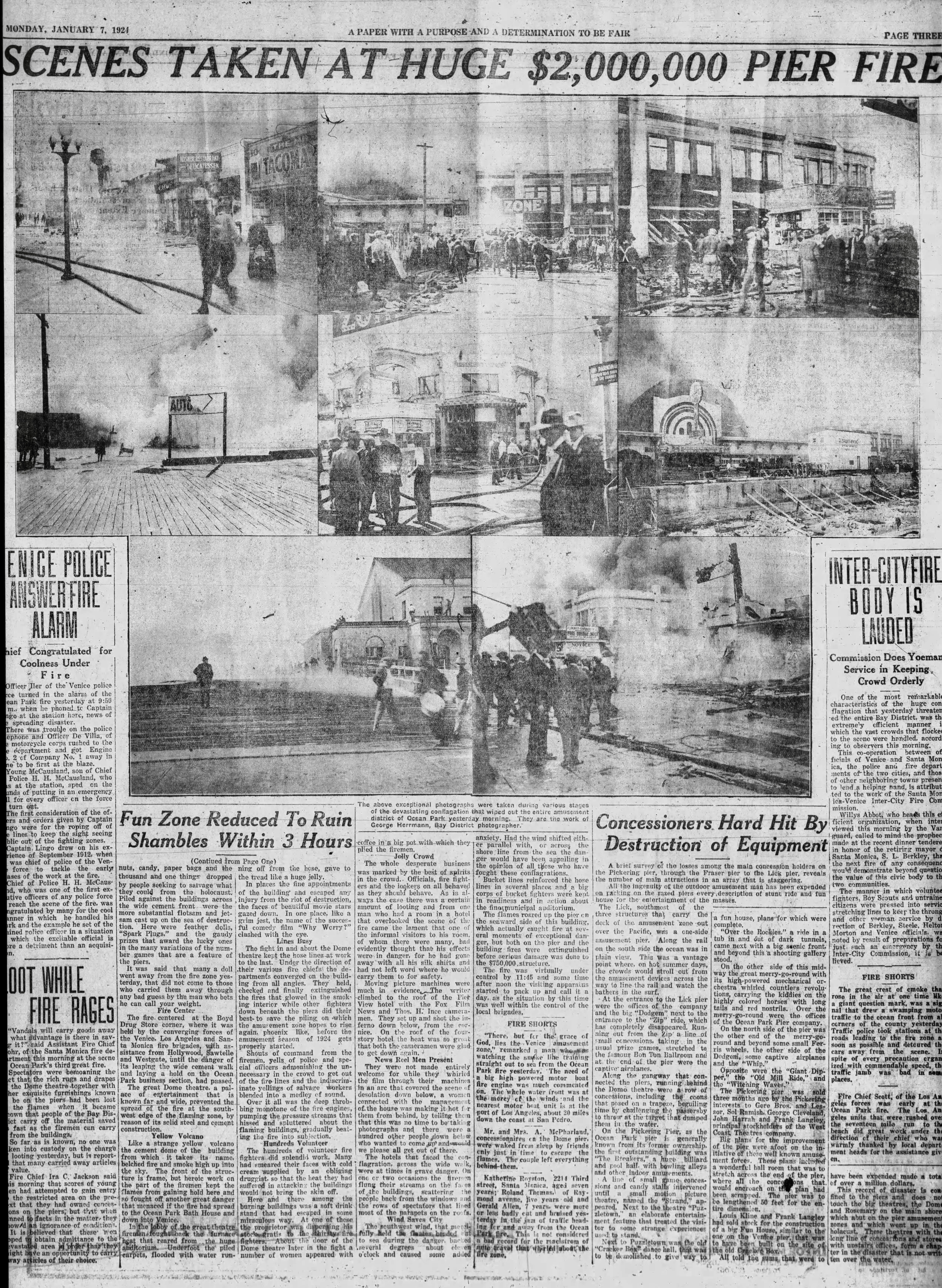
Venice Evening Vanguard photos of the fire

== See also ==
- 1912 Ocean Park pier fire
- 1915 Ocean Park pier fire
