= Crystal Pier =

California amusement pier (1905–1949)

Coordinates: 34.0026°N 118.4889°W

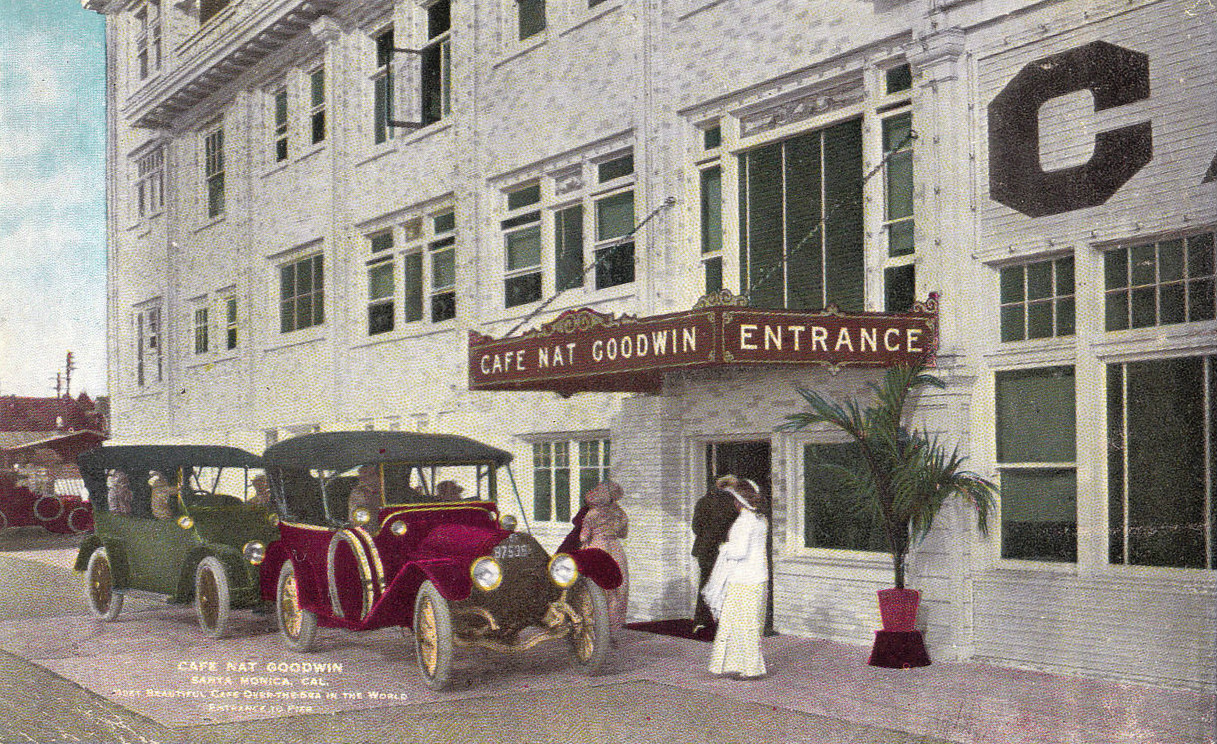
Cafe Nat Goodwin in 1915, named for its owner, the vaudevillian and film actor Nat Goodwin, on what was then called Bristol Pier

Crystal Pier stood off the shore of Santa Monica, California, United States from 1905 to 1949. Opened as the White Star Pier in July 1905, it later went by other names at various times including Hollister Pier, Bristol Pier, and Nat Goodwin Pier. Located at the end of Hollister Avenue, along what is now Will Rogers State Beach, Crystal Pier was the smallest of the Ocean Park amusement piers. In the 1930s, Crystal Pier stood north of the Ocean Park Pier and south of the Santa Monica Pier.

== See also ==
- Timeline of piers of Los Angeles County
