= 1915 Ocean Park pier fire =

Event in California

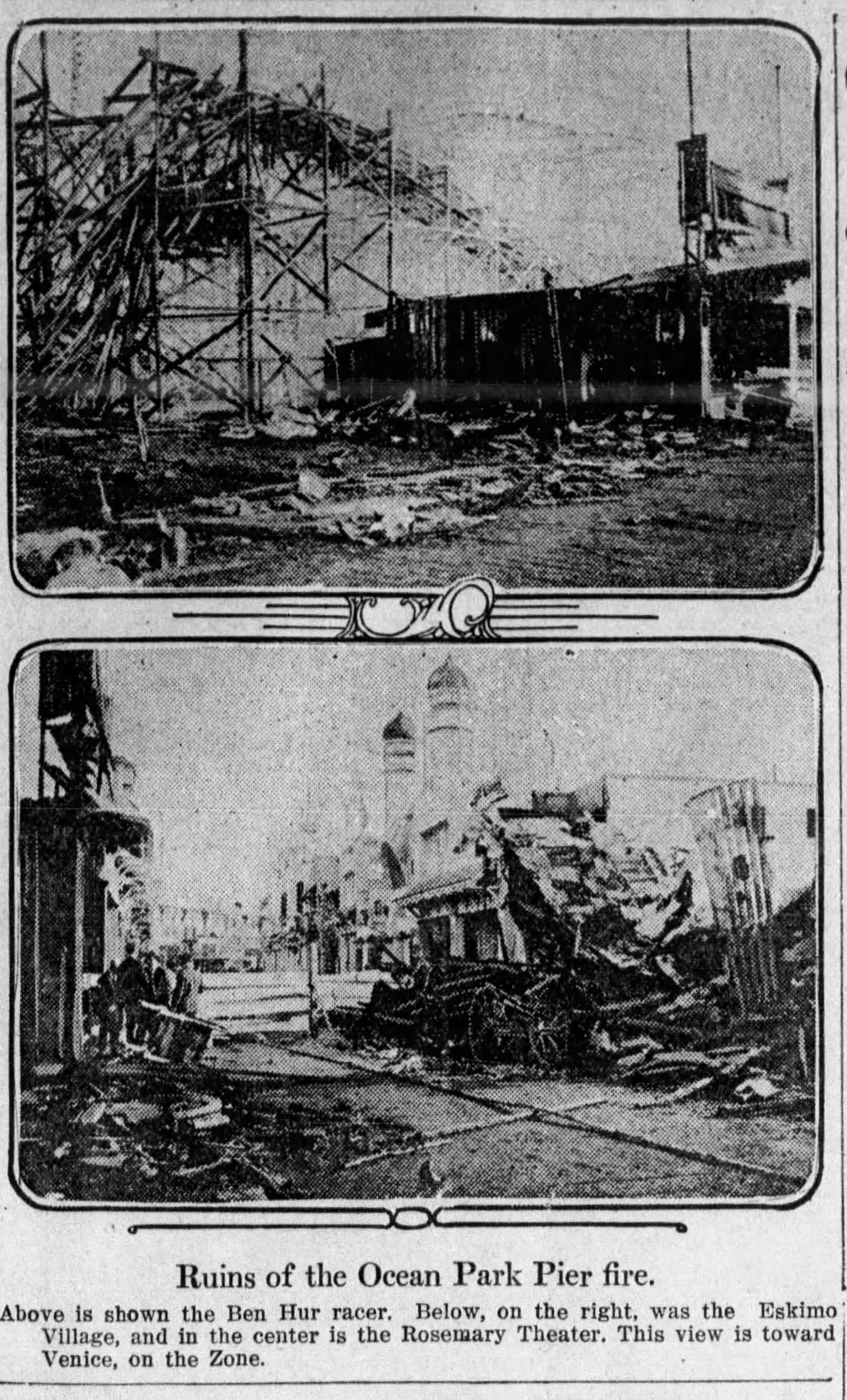
- "Ruins of the Ocean Park Pier fire" (Los Angeles Times, December 28, 1915)
- Date: December 27, 1915
- Location: 33.997°N 118.4827°E

The 1915 Ocean Park pier fire broke out about 1 a.m. on Monday, December 27, 1915, during the pier's mid-winter festival event in Ocean Park, Los Angeles County, California, United States. The fire destroyed about a third of Fraser's pier, including the dance hall, much of the Ben Hur roller coaster, a concession building, and part of the scenic railway on the north side of the pier. The explosion of a 100 U.S. gal (380 L; 83 imp gal) gasoline tank on the pier contributed to the destruction.

Concessions damaged or destroyed included Paris by Night, the Bollinger Baby Little Elizabeth, small Japanese-owned shops, a bowling alley, Esquimaux [Eskimo] Village, Puzzletown, Arabian Village, candy shop, a palm-reader's room, cigar store, and a "midget village." The Davis soda fountain within the dance hall was also a total loss. The Breakers Café was saved.

The fire was likely started by an incompletely extinguished cigarette igniting the dance hall, or possibly faulty wiring. Among the people rescued by firefighters was an "Eskimo babe" who lived in an Eskimo village attraction on the pier. The Eskimo village usually had huskies on exhibit but they were not present at the time of the fire because they were being used on a film shoot in the mountains. There were eight monkeys or apes living on the pier at the time of the fire; they were released to fend for themselves when the fire broke out. Five monkeys were recovered by the following day.

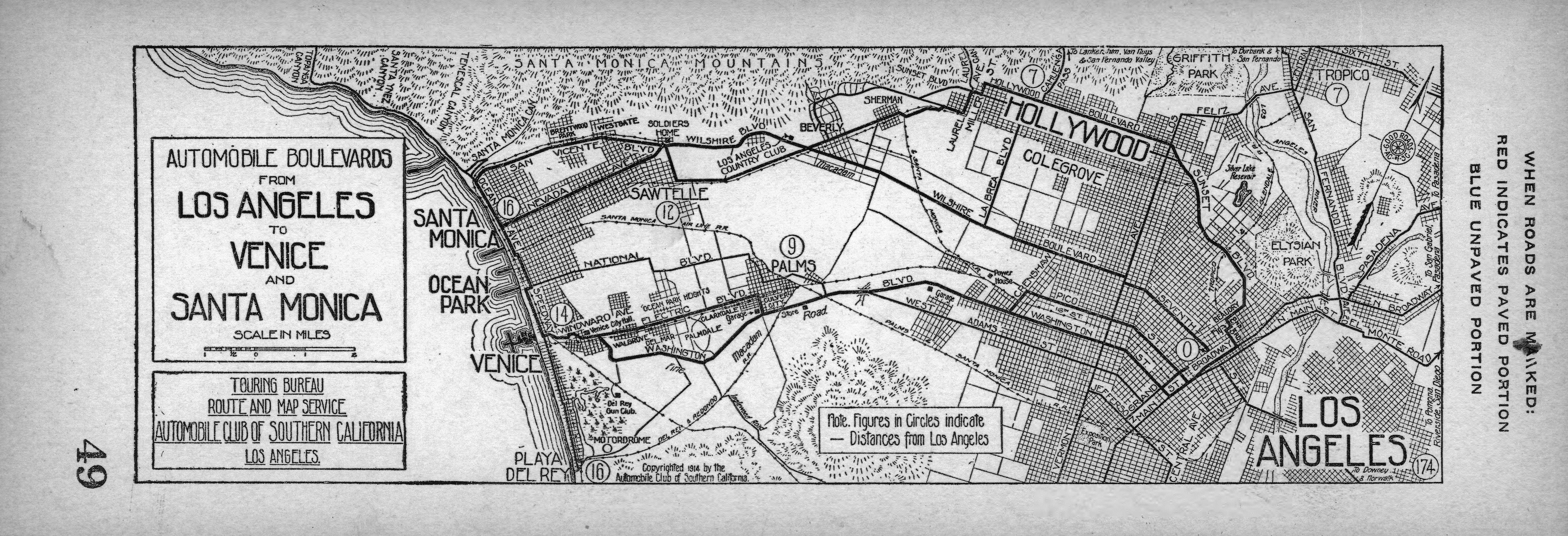
Map showing locations of Santa Monica, Ocean Park, and Venice in 1914

== See also ==
- 1912 Ocean Park pier fire
- 1924 Ocean Park pier fire
