= Long Beach pier auditorium disaster =

1913 multi-fatality incident

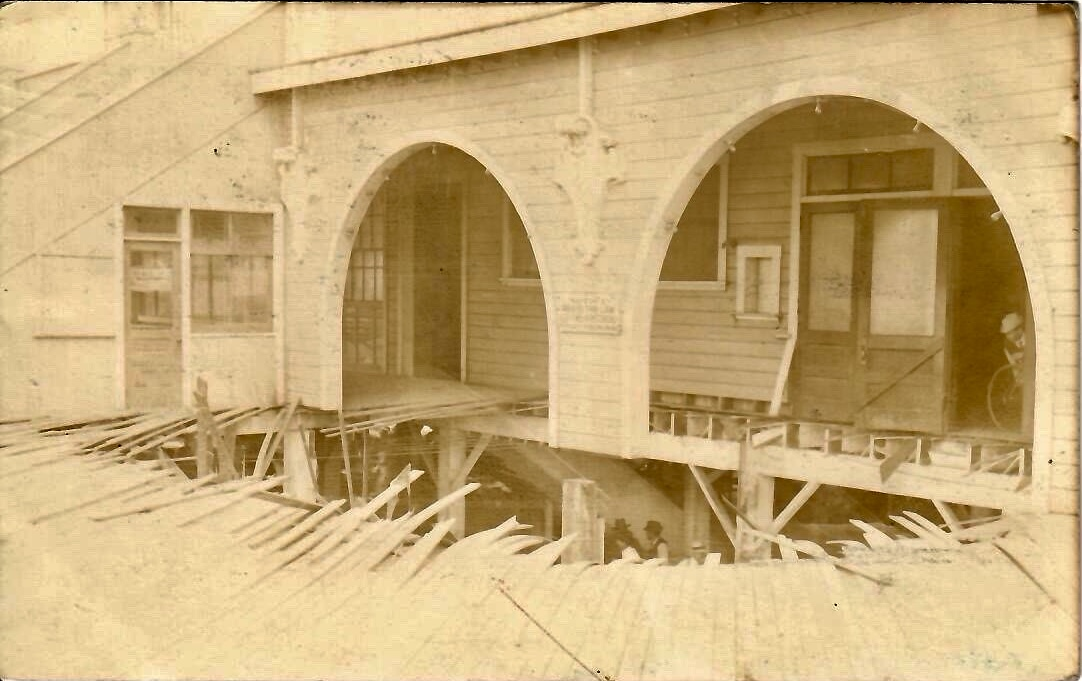
- Date: May 24, 1913
- Location: Long Beach Municipal Auditorium, Pine Street Pier, Long Beach, California, United States
- Deaths: 39
- Injuries: 150+

The Long Beach pier auditorium disaster, sometimes known as the Empire Day tragedy, occurred on Saturday, May 24, 1913, in Long Beach, California, United States, when the top level of the Pine Avenue Pier collapsed near the entrance to the municipal auditorium. A 40 ft (12 m) section holding by some 400 people dropped 25 ft (7.6 m) when a rotted girder snapped. The final death toll was 39, with some 150 injuries.

The pier was the second pier at that location. (The first Long Beach Municipal Pier was built in 1894.) The recreation wharf had been opened to the public in 1904. In 1905 the pier added an auditorium "designed by renowned California architect Joseph Cather Newsom and featured an assembly space large enough to accommodate 5,000, multilevel outdoor promenades and two towers framing the central section of the building....a horrendous structural failure caused by wood rot" killed and injured almost 200 people when the floor collapsed. The pier was especially crowded that day because of an Empire Day celebration of the Commonwealth on the anniversary of Queen Victoria's birthday, which had attracted tens of thousands of British expatriates from around Southern California. The California State Supreme Court later found the city of Long Beach "negligent for the rotted wooden pier pilings".

After the upper deck collapsed in 1913, the city wanted to demolish the entire structure but residents lobbied for a restoration, and a reconstructed Pine Avenue Pier opened in 1915. The repaired Pine Avenue pier stood until 1934.

== Gallery ==
Long Beach pier auditorium disaster
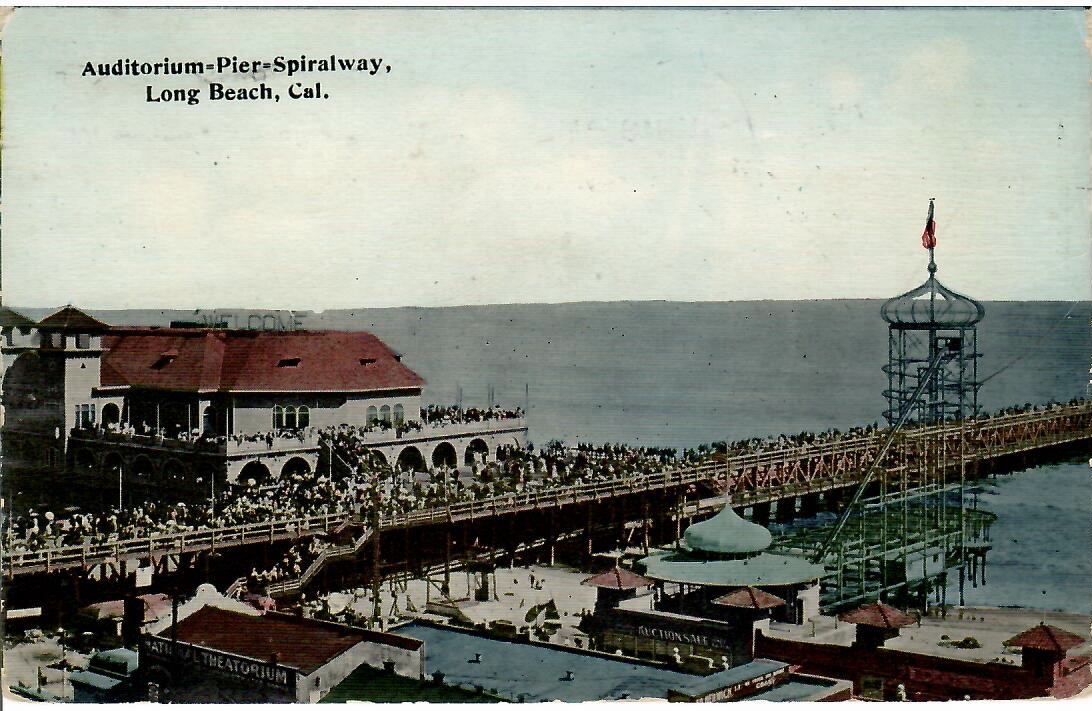
Lithographic postcard postmarked January 18, 1913, showing the auditorium on the beach end of the pier

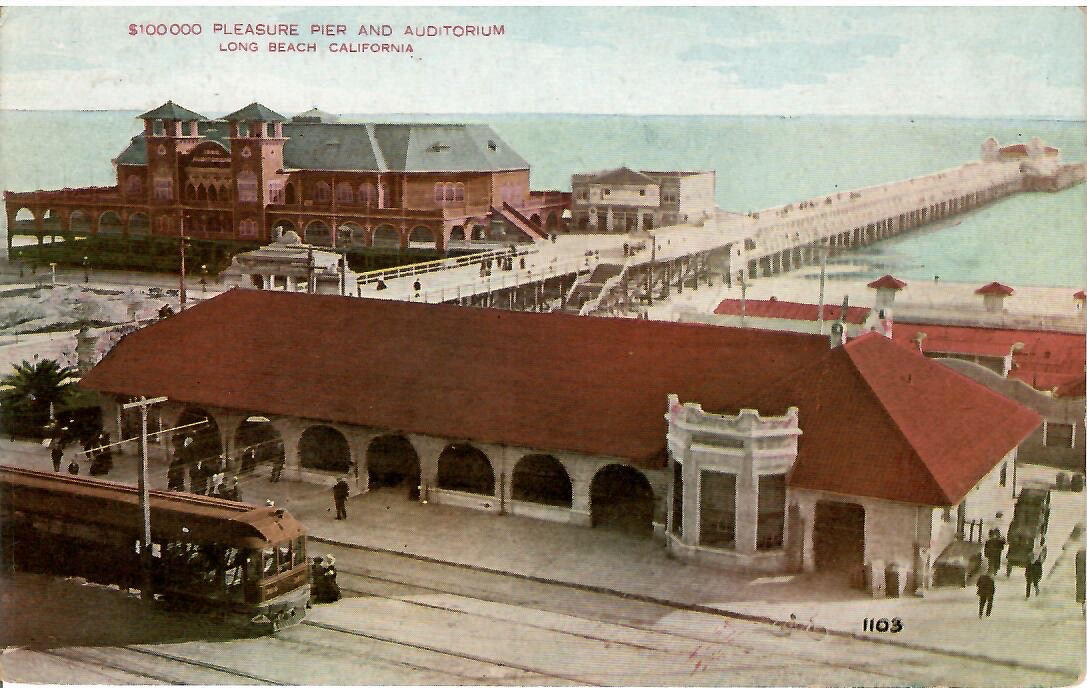
The building in front of the pier is Pacific Electric's Long Beach station, southern terminus of the Long Beach Line

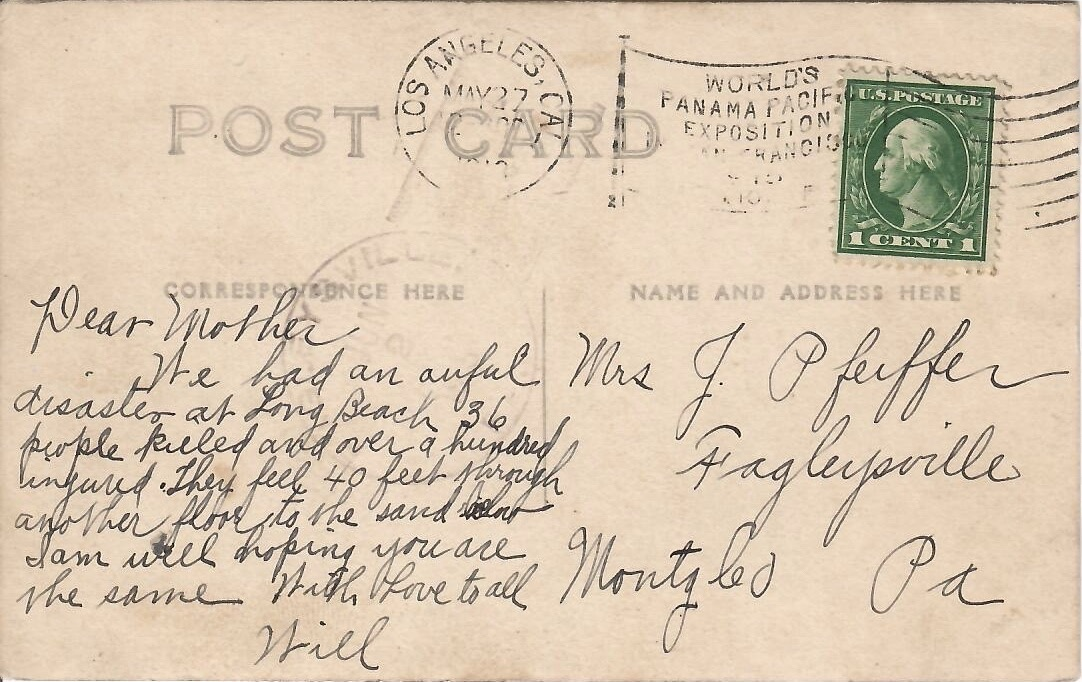
Verso of real photo postcard of the collapsed deck—"they fell 40 feet through another floor to the sand"

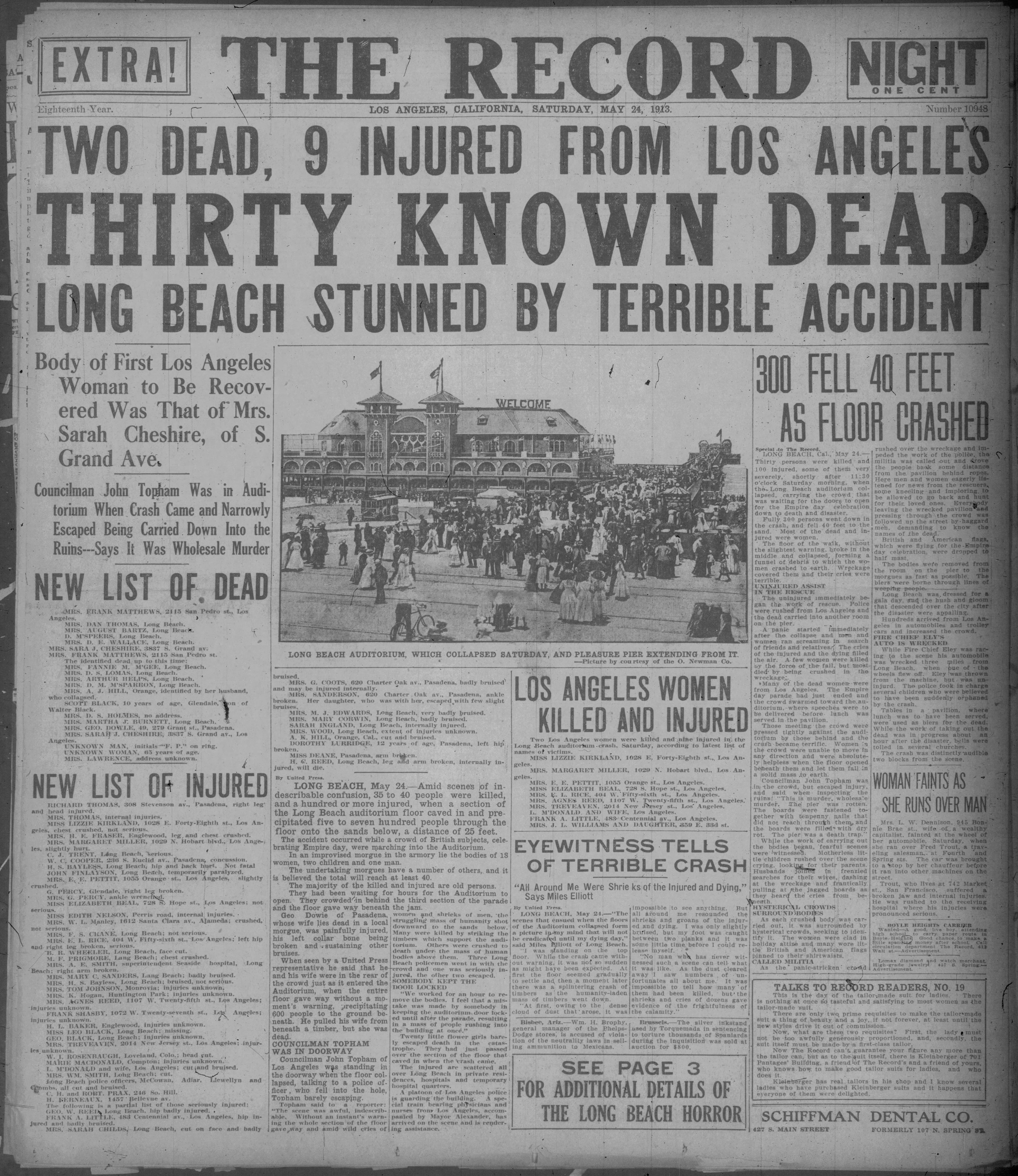
Los Angeles Evening Record front page

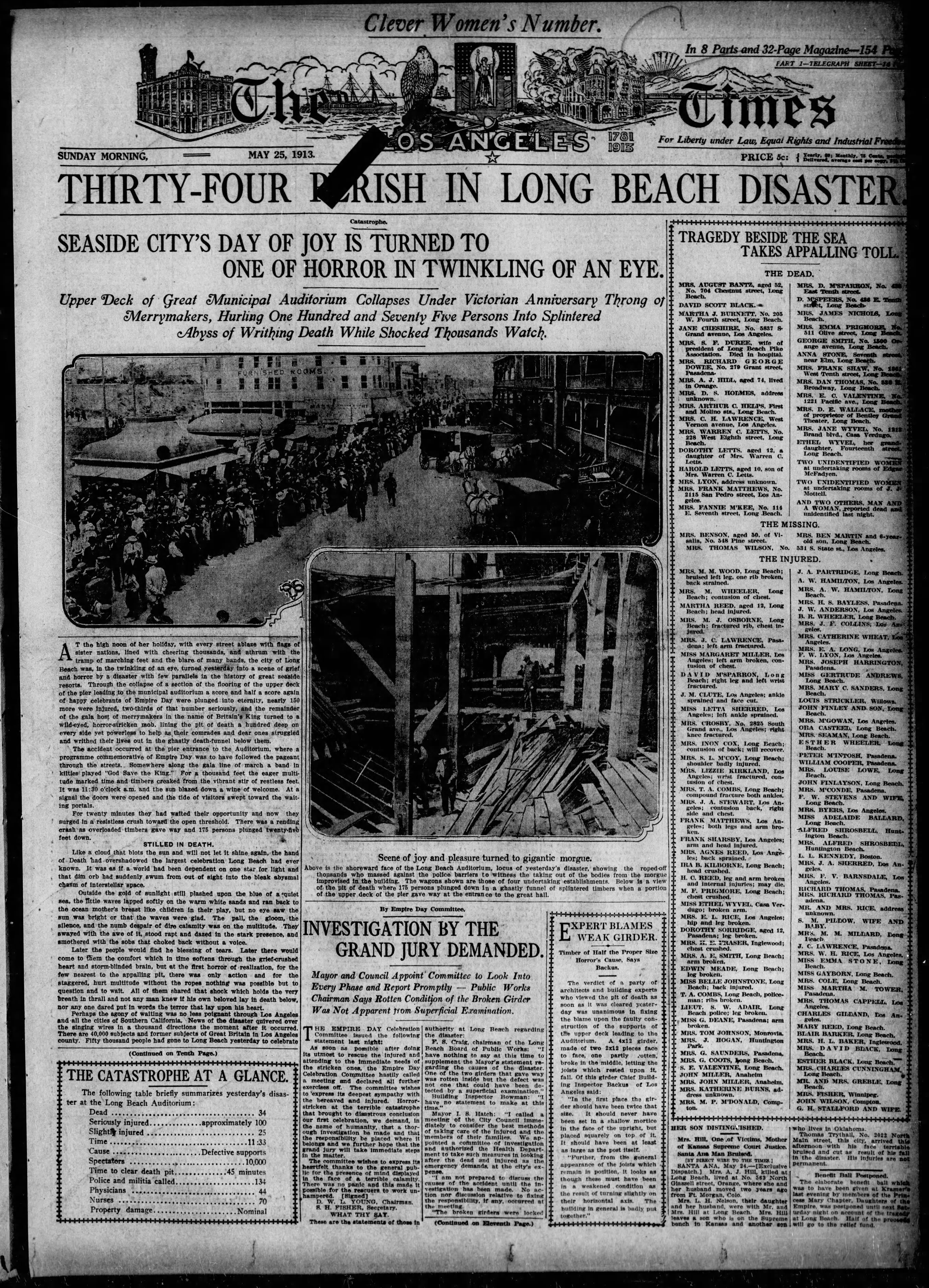
Los Angeles Times front page
