= Fraser's Million Dollar Pier =

U.S. amusement park (1911–1912)

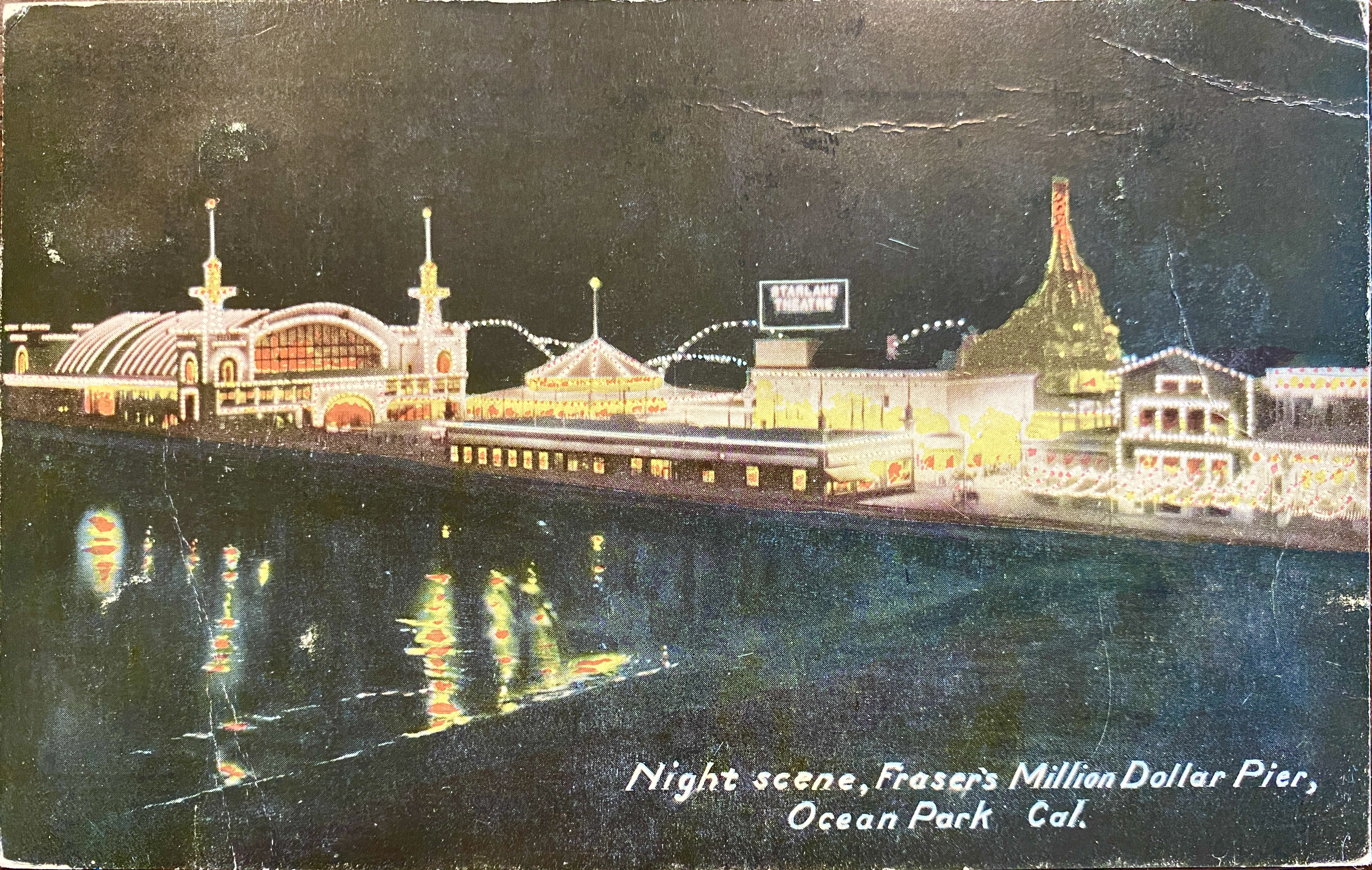
- Coordinates: 33.997°N 118.483°W
- Owner: Alexander H. Fraser

History
- Designer: Eager & Eager
- Construction start: September 1, 1910
- Opening date: June 17, 1911
- Destruction date: September 3, 1912

Fraser's Million Dollar Pier was a 20th-century amusement park in Ocean Park, California in the United States. The pier was located between Pier Avenue and Marine Street, in a community situated between Santa Monica and Venice in Los Angeles County. Developed by Alexander R. Fraser, a booster in Ocean Park who had formerly been business partners with Abbot Kinney of Venice, the pier opened to the public on June 17, 1911 and was destroyed September 3, 1912 in a catastrophic fire that spread into the adjacent neighborhood and destroyed six to eight square blocks.

The pier was also known as the Fraser Pier and the Ocean Park Pier; both names were also applied to a second pier built on the same site that stood from 1913 to 1924.

== History ==
Fraser's Million Dollar Pier was one of several "amusement piers" (such as the Abbot Kinney Pier, Sunset Pier, Crystal Pier, and so forth) that were built in the first half of the 20th century on the Santa Monica Bay, most of which drew huge crowds in their day, and several of which eventually burned in huge fires. The Ocean Park pier was developed by Alexander H. Fraser, who had once been partners with Kinney, the developer of neighboring Venice, California. Fraser was born in New Brunswick and had come, by way of Michigan, to California in 1886.

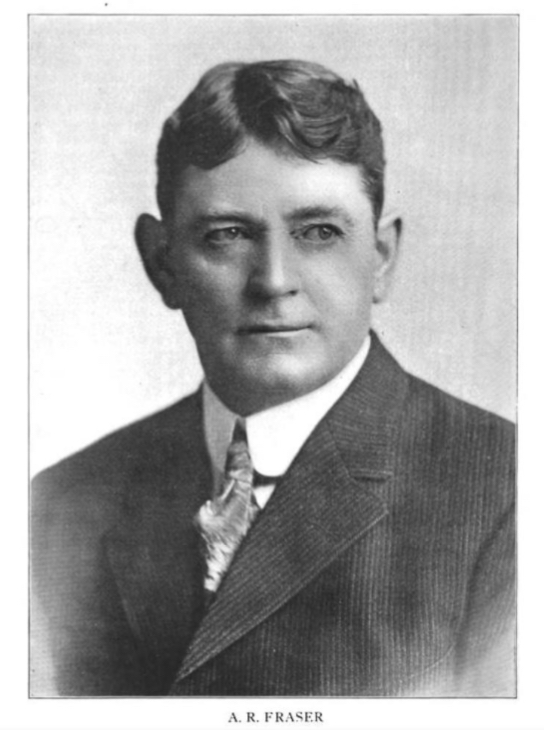
Alexander Rosborough Fraser (1856–1923)

Fraser's Million Dollar Pier was one of three piers in Ocean Park in 1911, along with the Municipal Pier at Colorado Avenue and Bristol Pier at Hollister Avenue. The Million Dollar Pier was built on a wharf that had first been constructed by Abbot Kinney and Francis Ryan in 1897, and abandoned in 1904. The pier may have been a replacement for an adjacent, less-lavish Horseshoe Pier, and was reportedly based on a model in Atlantic City, New Jersey, Young's Million Dollar Pier. Fraser would later place advertisements featuring a point-by-point comparison of the two million-dollar piers. The new pier was constructed between Pier Avenue and Marine Street, where South Beach Park and the Sea Colony condominiums stand at present. Construction began September 1, 1910. According to a newspaper announcement of October 1910, Fraser's Million Dollar Pier had been capitalized with $300,000 in stock. By December work was well underway on plans made by architects Eager & Eager. The pier's 800 concrete pilings were 18–34 inches (46–86 cm) in diameter; the rest was built out of lumber. The pier measured 285 feet (87 m) by 1,000 feet (300 m), with an "extension" measuring 400 feet (120 m) by 100 feet (30 m). Fraser's Million Dollar Pier was lit up at night by a purported 250,000 incandescent light bulbs.

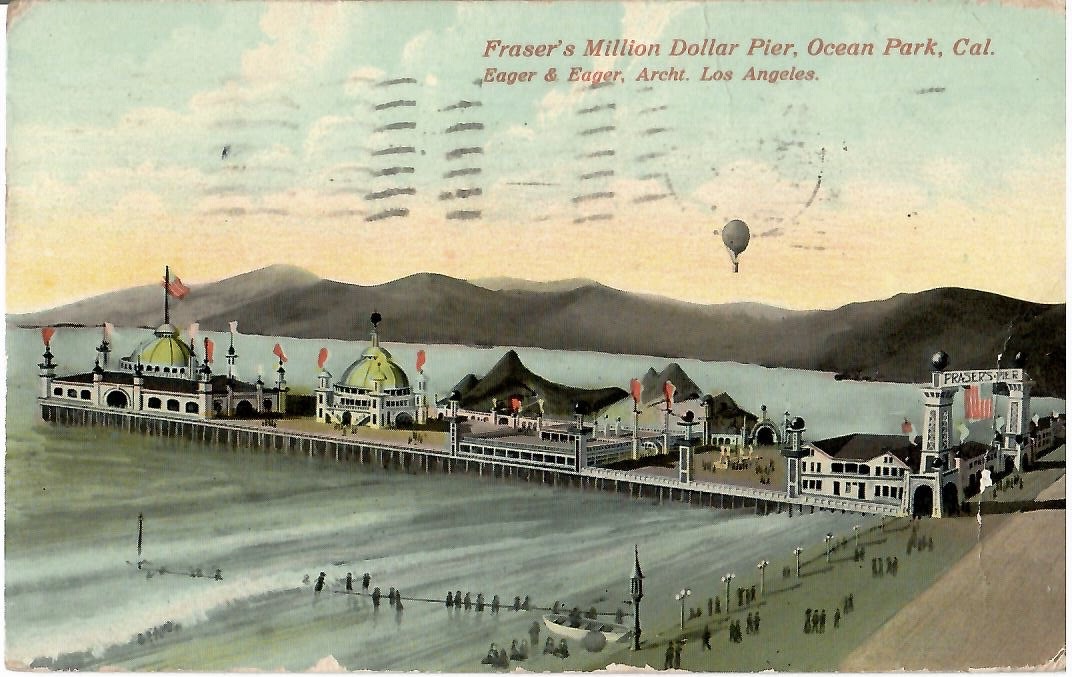
1911 postcard – Fraser's Million Dollar Pier, architect Eager & Eager

Opening day was June 17, 1911, and opening-weekend offerings included "musical and vaudeville entertainment, freak shows, a baby incubator show, refreshment stands, booths of all descriptions, and a diving tank." Adjacent structures not owned by Fraser included the Dragon's Gorge roller coaster, and Charles I. Looff's Hippodrome, which housed one of the Danish artisan's famed carousels.

== Attractions ==
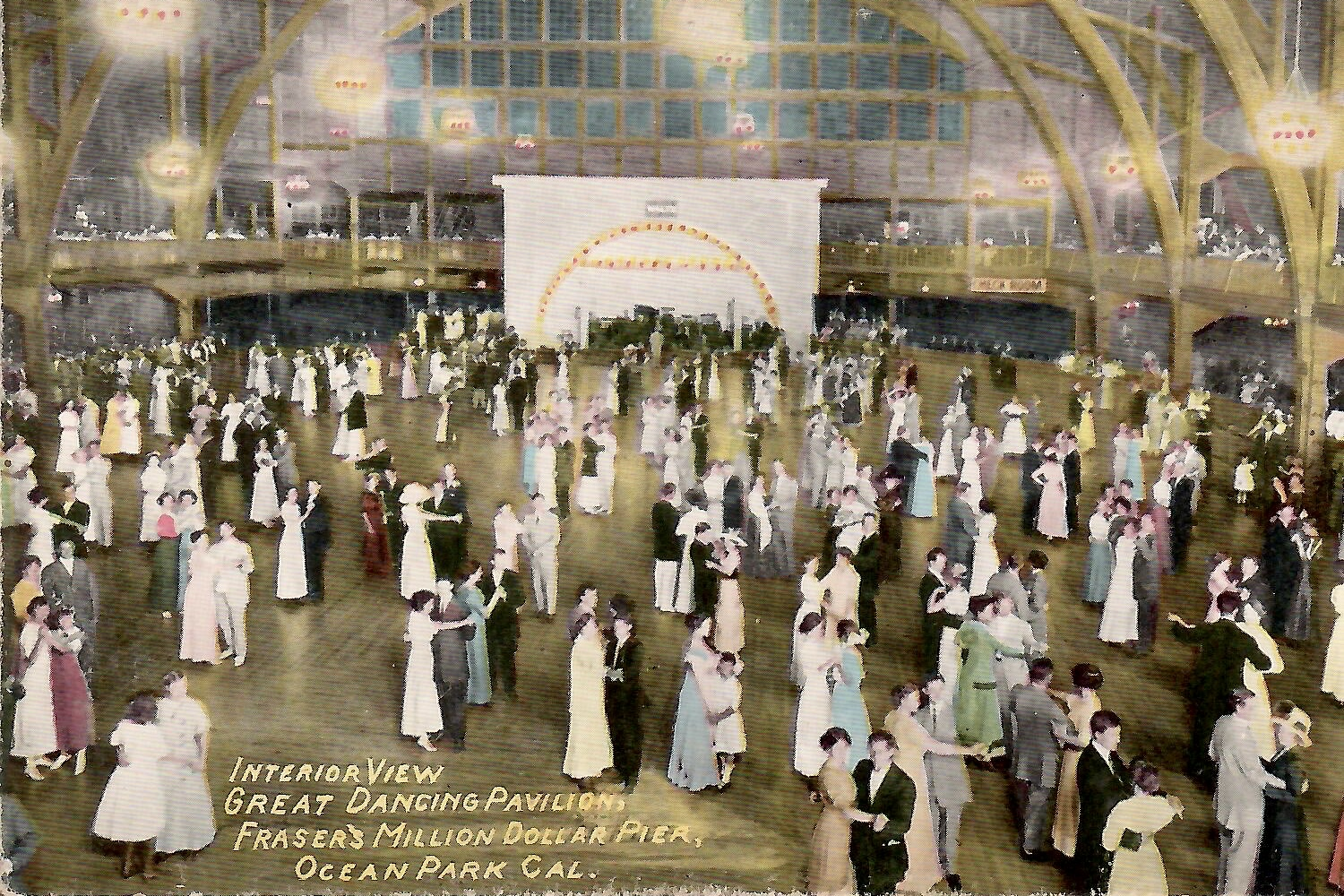
Great Dancing Pavilion, Fraser's Million Dollar Pier, Ocean Park, Cal.

- Ballroom: The dance hall had "automatically changing colored lights and German chimes."
- Carousel: Fraser's Million Dollar Pier featured a carousel manufactured by Philadelphia Tobaggan Company. According to one account the carousel cost $15,000, according to another Fraser paid $16,500 for PTC carousel number 20 after the intended buyer, Asbury Park, New Jersey, rejected the design as too flamboyant. This carousel had a diameter of 52 feet (16 m), featured five rows of carousel horses, and had two nine-seat Roman chariots dubbed War and Peace.
- Roller coaster: The Grand Canyon Electric Railroad coaster took up nearly the entire north side of the pier. The coaster had almost a mile of track, and was powered by a third rail. The ride through "beautiful scenic canyons, and all beside Mr. Pacific's ocean" was said to be "protected by a block signal system."
- Skating rink: Turnbull's Skating Rink featured "Ritchardson's ball-bearing skates."
- Theater: The 1,000-seat theater on Fraser's Million Dollar Pier played both vaudeville shows and motion pictures. The building was designed by architect A. F. Rosenhelm and constructed of steel frame, lath, and plaster. The theater on the pier was called the Standard, the Starland, or Globe Theatre No. 6. Fraser claimed the construction cost for this theater was $20,000.
- Other: Other attractions of Fraser's Million Dollar Pier that were described or advertised included boating and deep-sea fishing, Donatelli's Famous Italian Band, Swift's Shooting Gallery, "The Third Degree, a smart show for smart people," the Crazy House, the Crooked House, the Mystic Maze, the Society Whirl (a "great fun maker"), the Harmon Wave Motor, an "aerial joyride," diving girls, bathing-girl contests, exotic birds on display at Birdland, Unger's balloon, a monkey in a hot-air balloon, premature babies in infant incubators, and, perhaps, an opium den.
- Nearby: Adjacent to the pier was the Dragon Gorge railway or roller coaster owned by Charles Hyle, which extended "for a great distance along the broad walk close to Pier Avenue," an "auto-maze" for cars, and Looff's Hippodrome.
- Concessions: Shops and restaurants on the pier included a Little Tokio shop ("featuring Japanese novelties"), a cigar stand, a peanut wagon, noodle houses, the Anchor Lunch Counter, Breaker's Café, and the Casino Café, which featured music by Angelotte's Hungarian Orchestra.
Fraser's Million Dollar Pier (1911–1912) and environs, Ocean Park, California
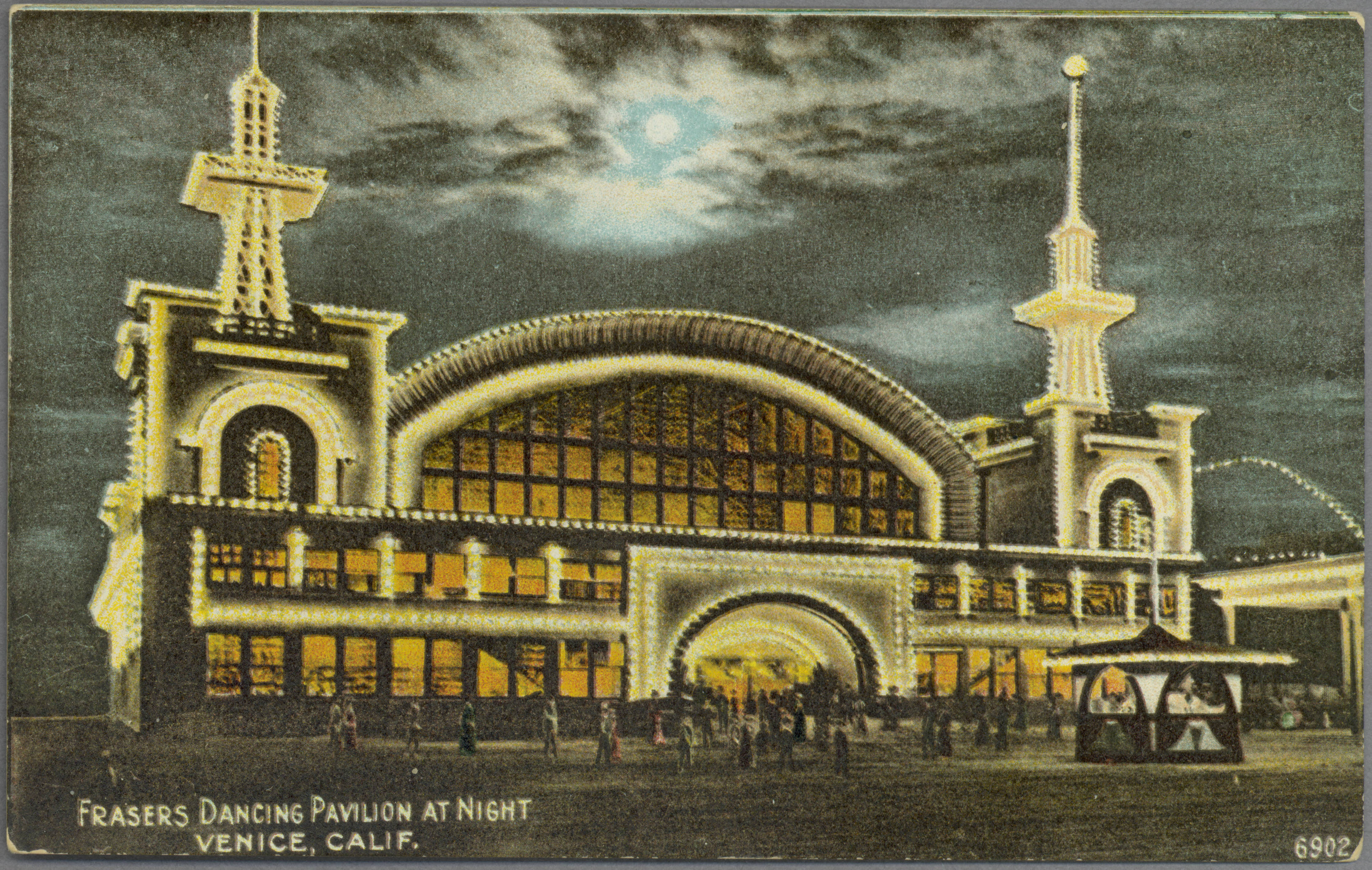
Fraser's Dancing Pavilion at night

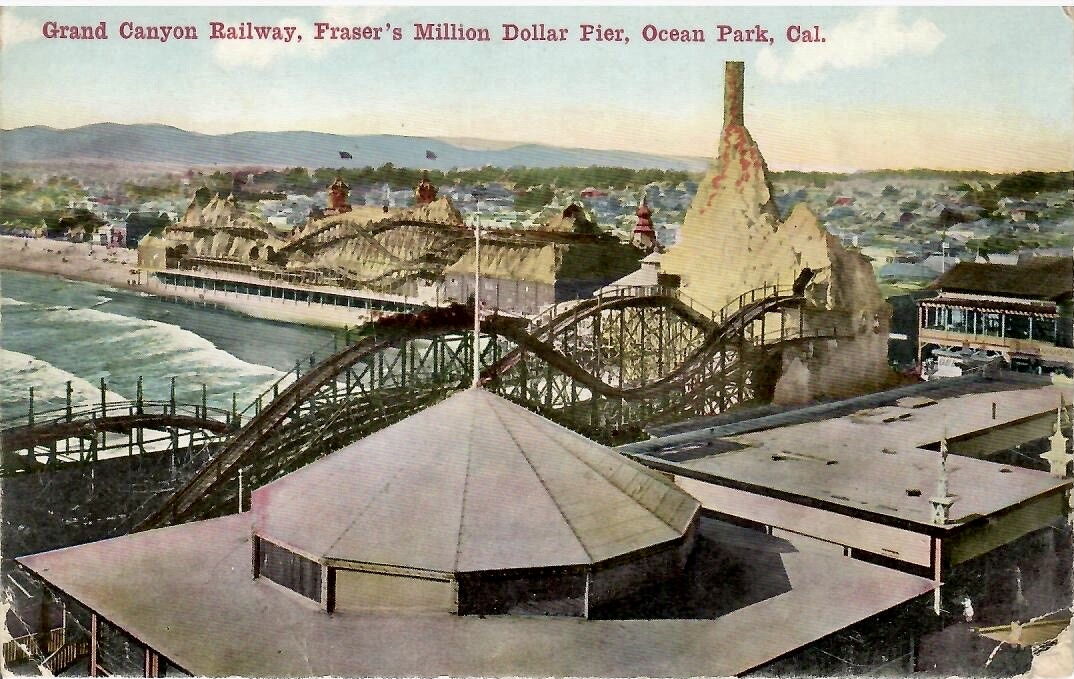
Grand Canyon Railway roller coaster

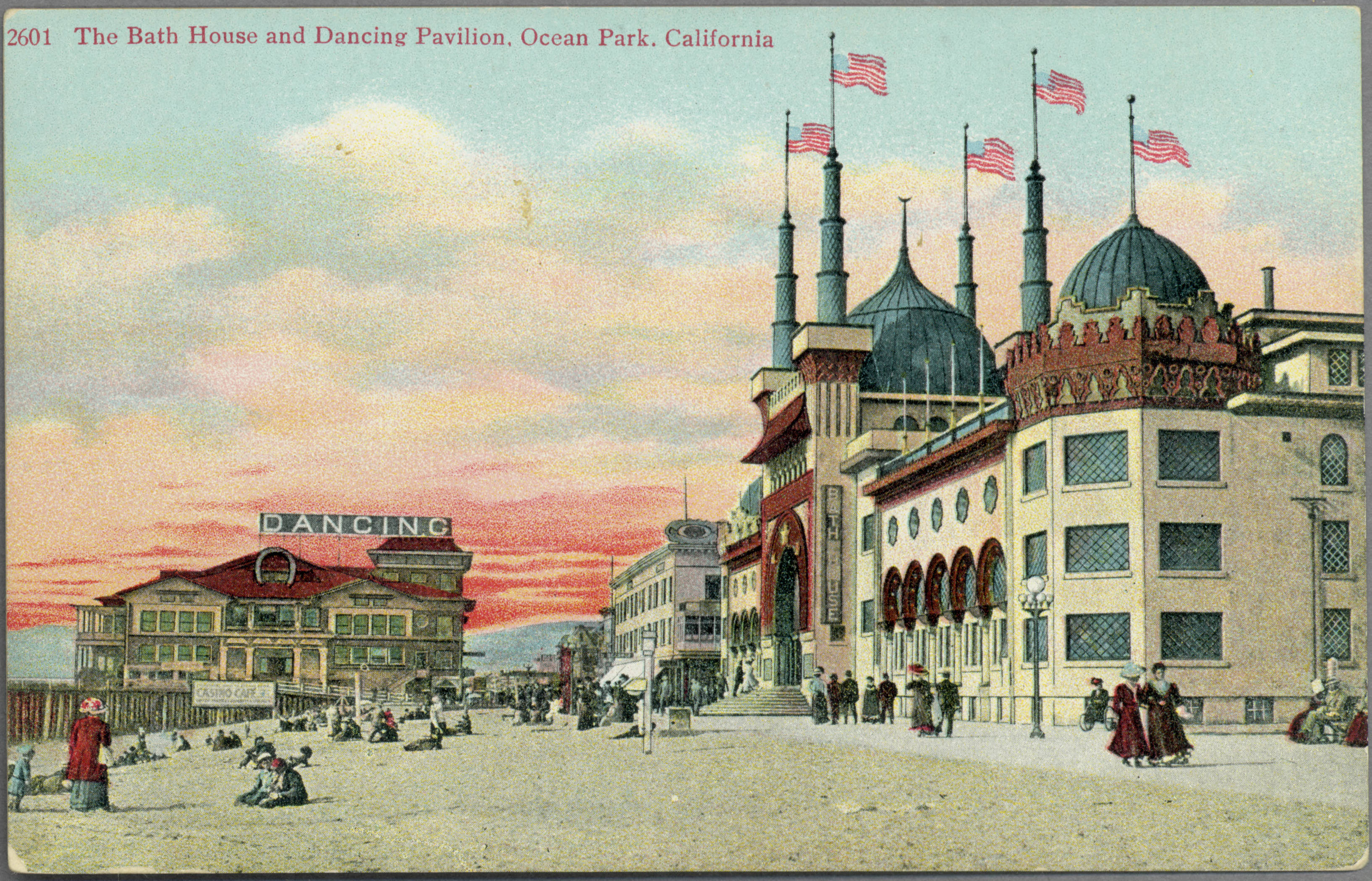
Casino café, and bathhouse

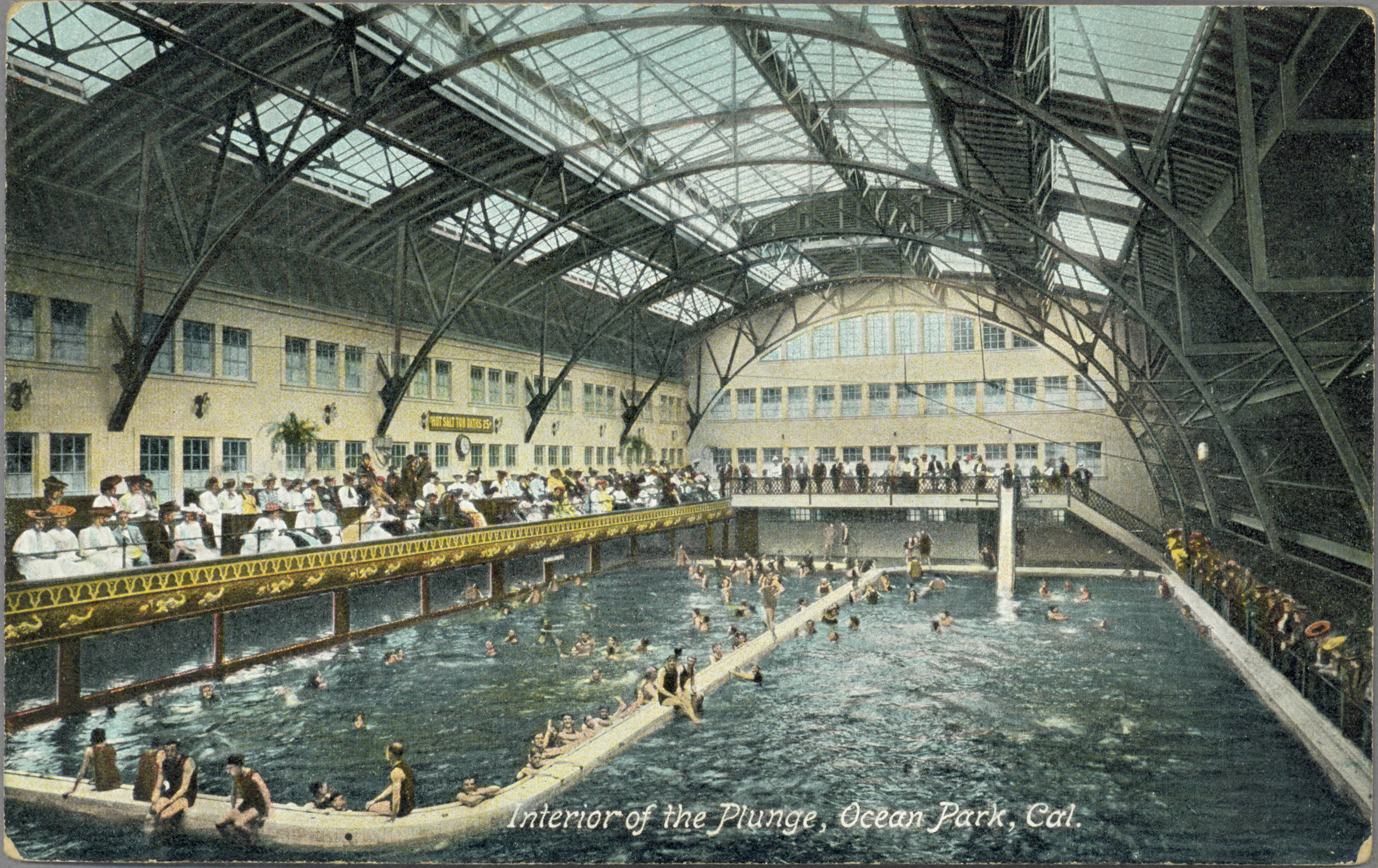
Ocean Park bathhouse, also called the Plunge or Natatorium

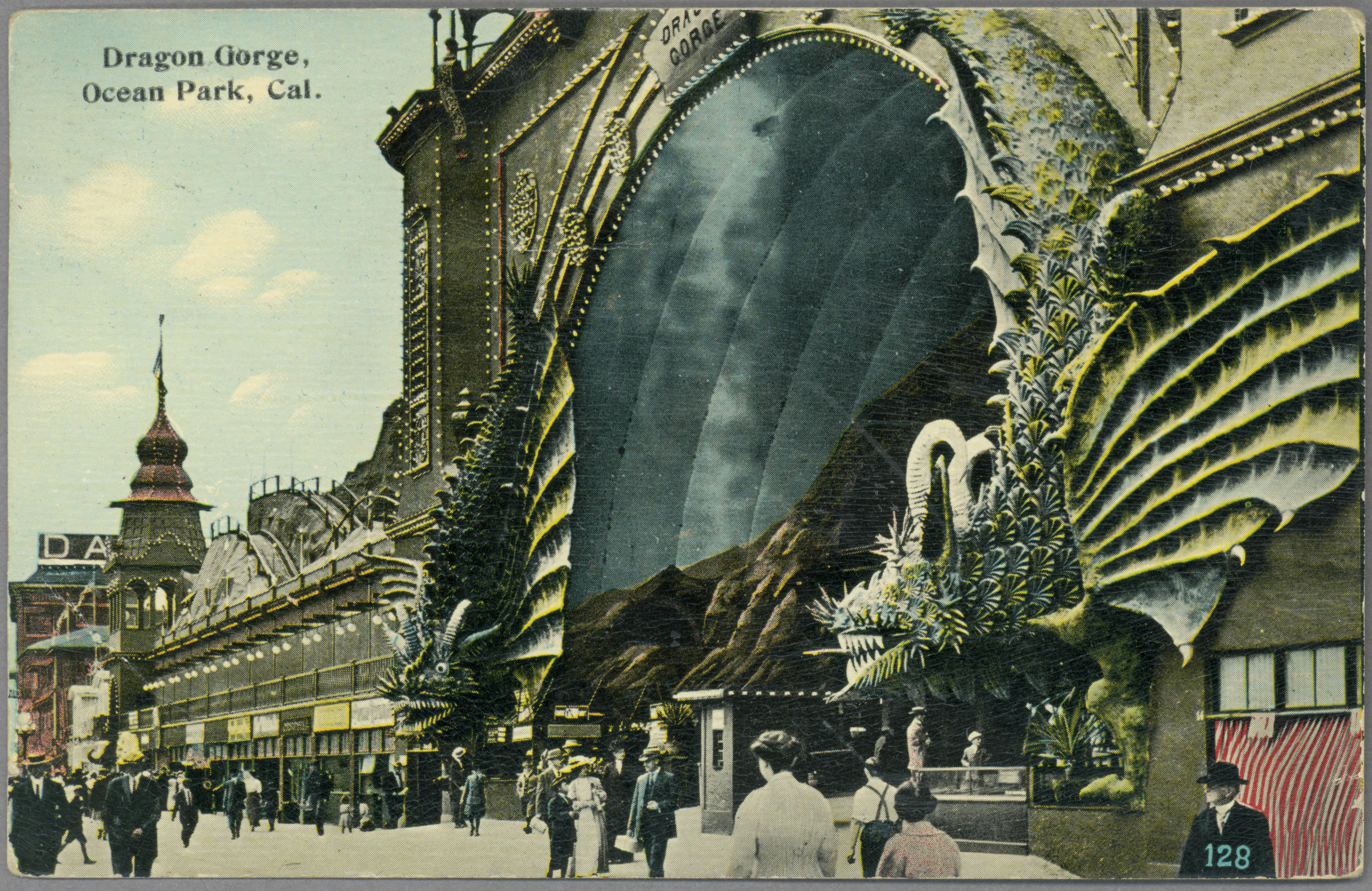
Dragon Gorge rollercoaster

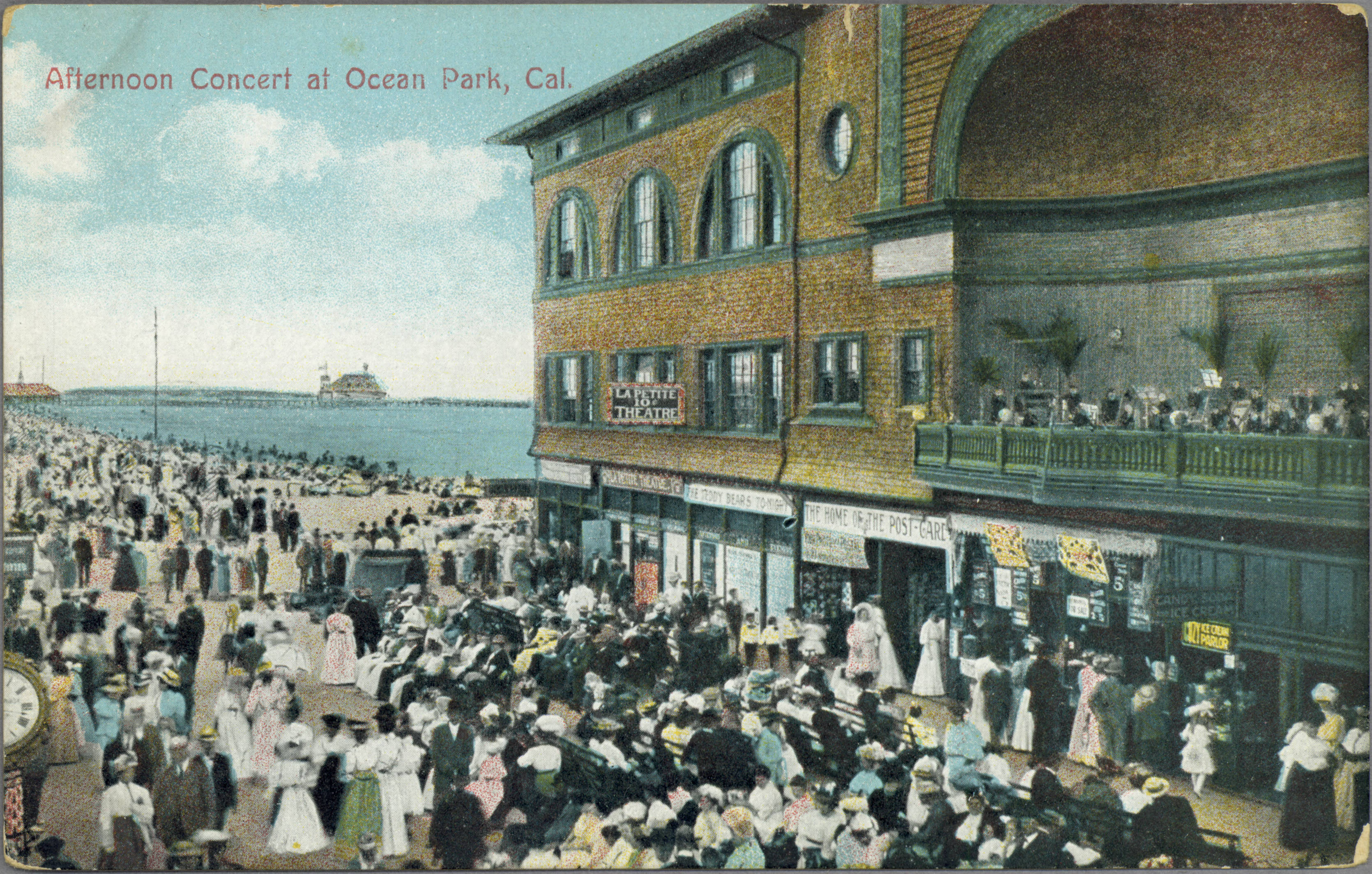
La Petite 10¢ Theater

== Fire ==
1912 Ocean Park fire
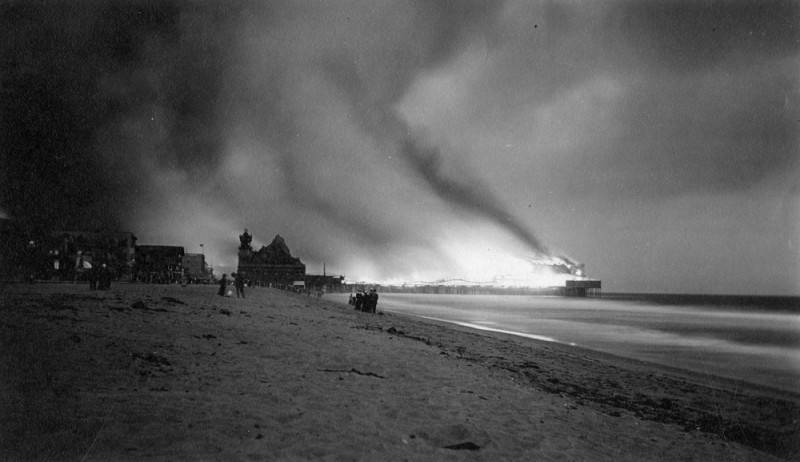
- Destruction of Fraser's Million Dollar Pier on the evening of Tuesday, September 3, 1912 (Los Angeles Public Library photo collection)
- Date: September 3, 1912
- Location: Ocean Park, California
- Cause: Unknown
- Deaths: 1
- Property damage: $500,000 to $3 million (1910)

The Ocean Park fire that destroyed Fraser's Million Dollar Pier was discovered between 4:45 and 4:55 p.m. on the evening of Tuesday, September 3, 1912, in the Coney Island chowder house in the Casino building. The cause was possibly a defective flue, or possibly a poorly extinguished cigarette. One newspaper noted that the fire had "seemed to have gained a good hold on the roof before it was discovered." According to the Los Angeles Times, 700 firefighters from 12 companies fought the fire for a little under four hours. Firefighters were somewhat delayed in getting to the scene because they had to fight "heavy traffic as thousands of spectators were driving toward the awesome thick black cloud of smoke that was obscuring the setting sun." In 1975, a Santa Monica author wrote, "The writer of this history and his cousin, Bernard Evans, young boys at the time, ran from the 900 block on Third Street to the scene of the fire and remained there until a rumor went through the crowd to the effect that buildings would be dynamited in order to create a firebreak...This was not done, but the rumor did serve to disperse the crowd."

A number of employees and tourists were trapped on the burning pier and had to jump into the ocean to escape, including A. H. Fraser and his son Earl Fraser, who were in the ballroom when the fire broke out. There was one death, H. L. Locke, a 60-year-old cashier who worked at the Casino Café. He was apparently overcome by the shock of jumping into the ocean to escape and then being lashed to a life preserver so that he would not drown. The nine babies who were living in the baby incubator exhibit were all "taken in the metal cases of the Incubators and carried safely off the burning pier" by one Frederick House. A week-old newborn, pair of Mexican-American twins, and a 14-ounce (400 g) Japanese-American micro-preemie were among the infants transferred to nearby St. Catherine's Hospital.

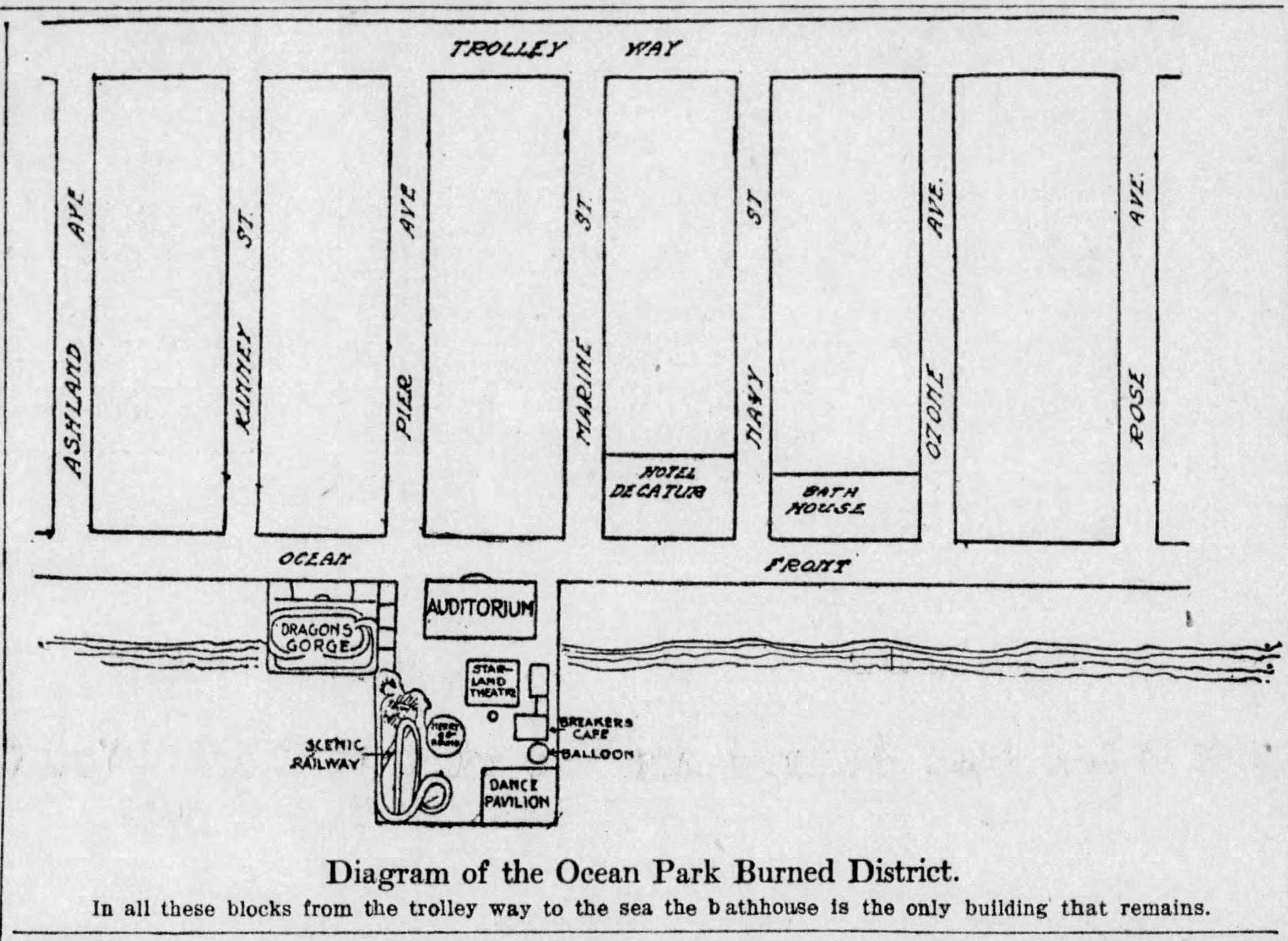
"Diagram of Ocean Park Burned District" Los Angeles Times, September 4, 1912

High winds fanned the flames and carried burning embers that spread fire throughout the wooden pier buildings, first consuming the café, then engulfing the skating rink and the dance hall, and then jumping Ocean Front Walk to ignite the Decatur Hotel, Park Hotel, Grand theater, La Petite theater, Rose theater, Ramona theater, the office and printing plant of the Ocean Park Journal newspaper, the Santa Fe railroad office, cottages, apartments, and others. Neighboring attractions, including Looff's Hippodrome with its carousel, the Dragon Gorge roller coaster, and the Revolving Grotto, were all destroyed as well. The only major building in the vicinity that survived was the Ocean Park natatorium (bath house and swimming pool). Two gasoline tanks, totaling 485 US gallons (1,840 L; 404 imp gal), exploded from the heat and contributed to the general destruction. Firefighters were able to hold the line at Trolleyway between 8:30 p.m. and 10 p.m. when the wind shifted and began blowing the fire and smoke back toward the water.

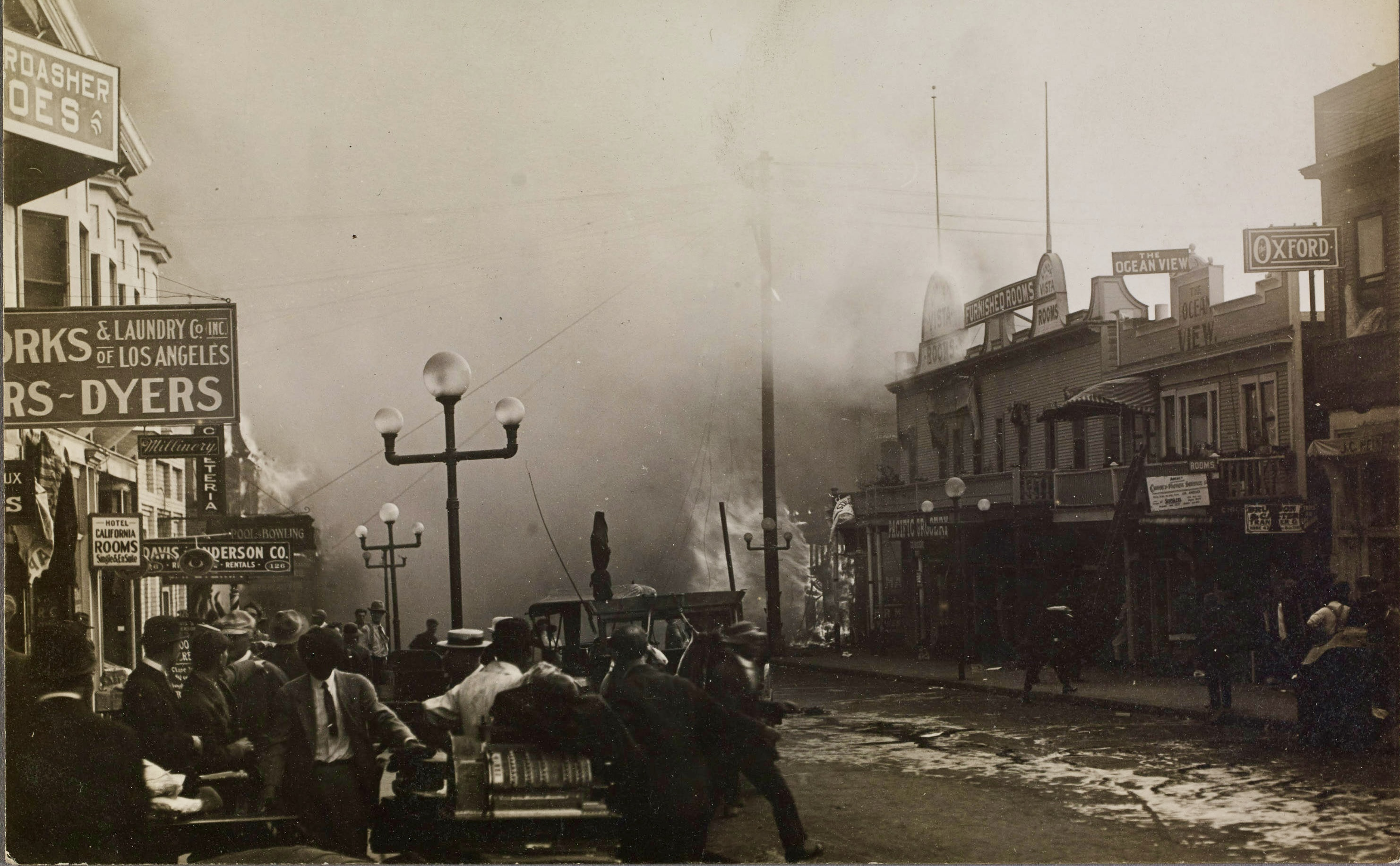
1912 fire at Ocean Park (Ernest Marquez Collection, Huntington Library)

The Ocean Park fire that started on Fraser's Million Dollar Pier destroyed 220 to 225 structures in a six-block area between Navy Street and Ashland Avenue. The Los Angeles Evening Post-Record reported that eight blocks were wrecked. Historians believe that the fire left about 250 families homeless, with another 800 people (presumably visiting tourists) needing temporary shelter. Estimates of monetary damages ranged from US$500,000 (equivalent to $16,681,034 in 2025) to US$3,000,000 (equivalent to $100,086,207 in 2025).

The blackened ruins of the pier and Ocean Park drew immense crowds the weekend following the fire. Bison Film Co. filmed the fire and a theater in neighboring Venice exhibited the movie just days after the fact.

Reconstruction began quickly, with loads of lumber arriving in short order and capitalists announcing plans to rebuild Ocean Park. A replacement for Fraser's Million Dollar Pier, generally known as the Ocean Park Pier, opened May 30, 1913, and survived as a popular regional attraction until it was destroyed in a fire on January 6, 1924.

== Additional images ==
1912 Ocean Park pier fire
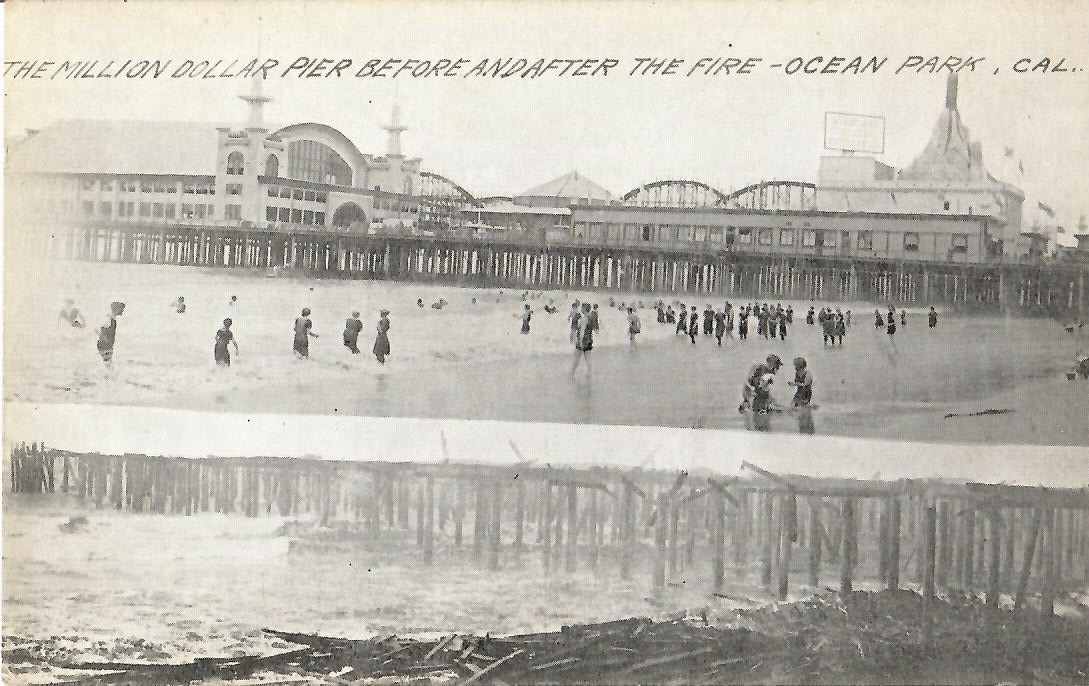
The Million Dollar Pier Before and After the Fire - Ocean Park, Calif.

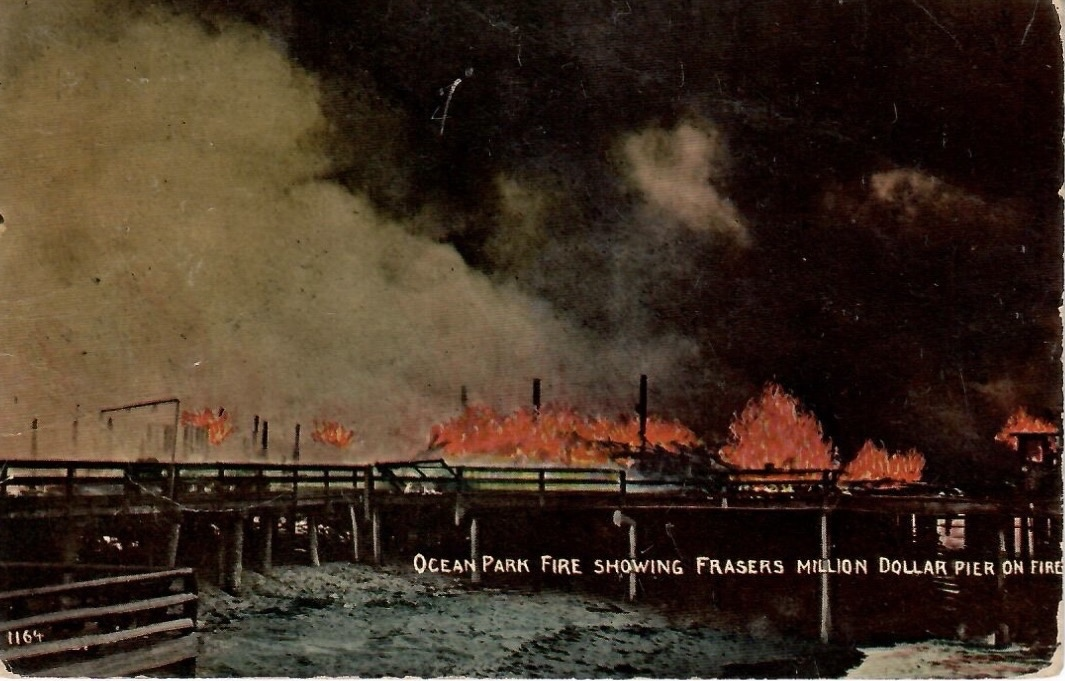
Fraser's Million Dollar Pier on fire

== See also ==
- Timeline of piers of Los Angeles County
- History of Santa Monica, California
- History of the Japanese in Los Angeles
- Martin A. Couney – American physician and neonatal technology pioneer
- Gilman Hot Springs – Thermal springs in California
- Venice Miniature Railway
- Abbot Kinney Pier
