= Ocean Park, Santa Monica =

Ocean Park
- Neighborhood
- Ocean Park, Santa Monica
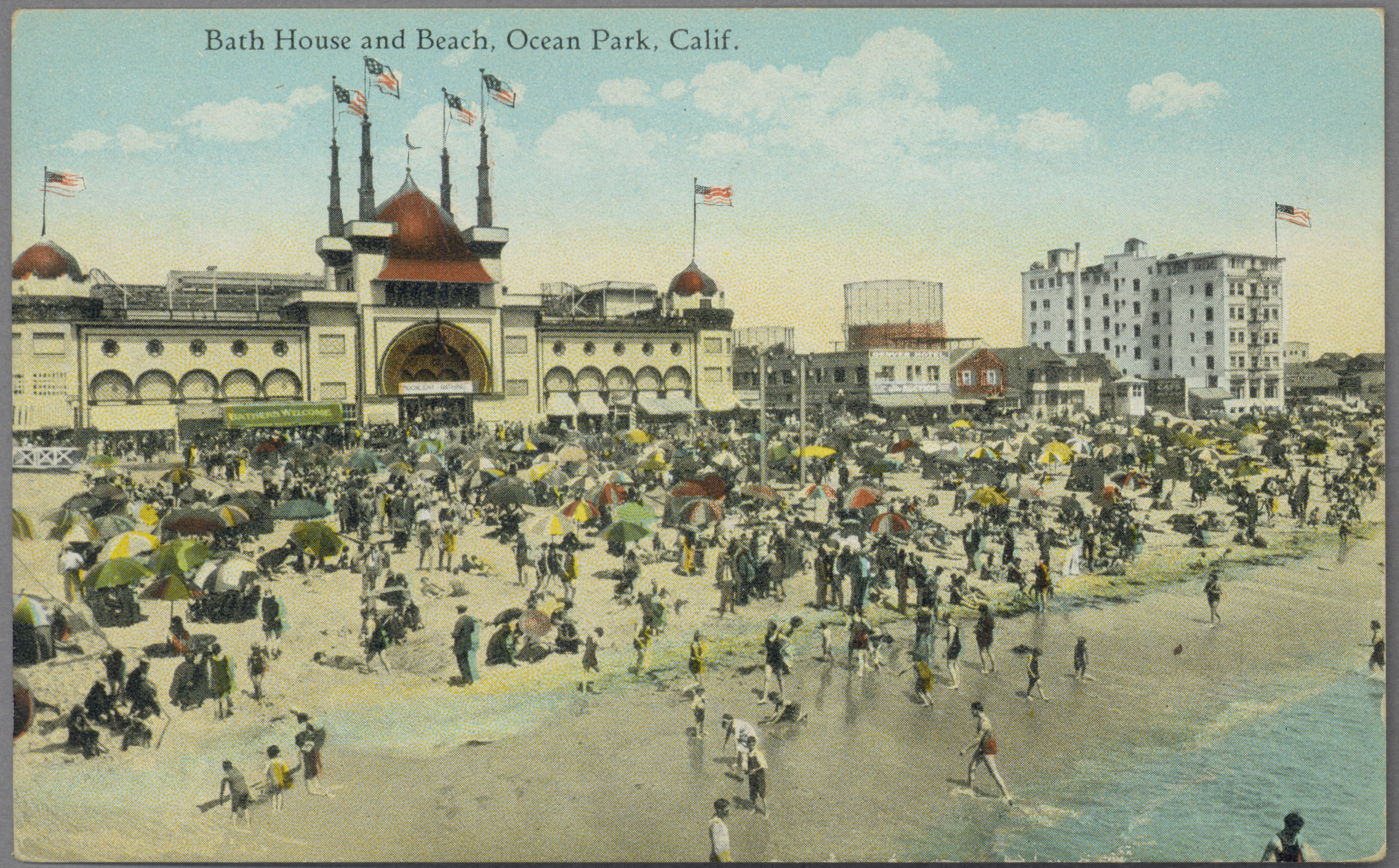
- Ocean Park bath house and beach c. 1915

- Ocean Park in western Los Angeles
- Coordinates: 34°01′19″N 118°28′53″W
- Country: United States
- State: California
- County: Los Angeles
- Established: 1895
- Elevation: 105 ft (32 m)

Population
  - Total: 5,966
- Time zone: UTC−8 (Pacific)
  - Summer (DST): UTC−7 (PDT)
- ZIP Codes: 90405
- Area codes: 310, 424

Ocean Park is a Santa Monica neighborhood of Santa Monica in the Westside region of Los Angeles County, United States.

== History ==
Developer Abbot Kinney and Francis G. Ryan, of the firm Kinney & Ryan, acquired the deed to the coastal strip previously purchased by W. D. Vawter and named the area Ocean Park in May 1895.

It became their first amusement park and residential project. A horse-racing track, pier, and golf course were built near the Ocean Park Casino. Kinney convinced the Santa Fe Railroad to extend its Inglewood line north to his resort. When his partner Francis Ryan died in October 1898, his widow's new husband, Thomas H. Dudley, sold their half interest to a group of men, Fraser, Gage and Merritt Jones. Kinney focused on developing the southern end of the property, which he made into Venice of America. The Ocean Park post office was opened in July 1889 and the Ocean Park Fire Company in February 1900. In March 1902, the Ocean Park bank was organized by Thomas H. Dudley, Kinney, Martin Dudley, and Plez James.

== Ocean Park Branch Library ==
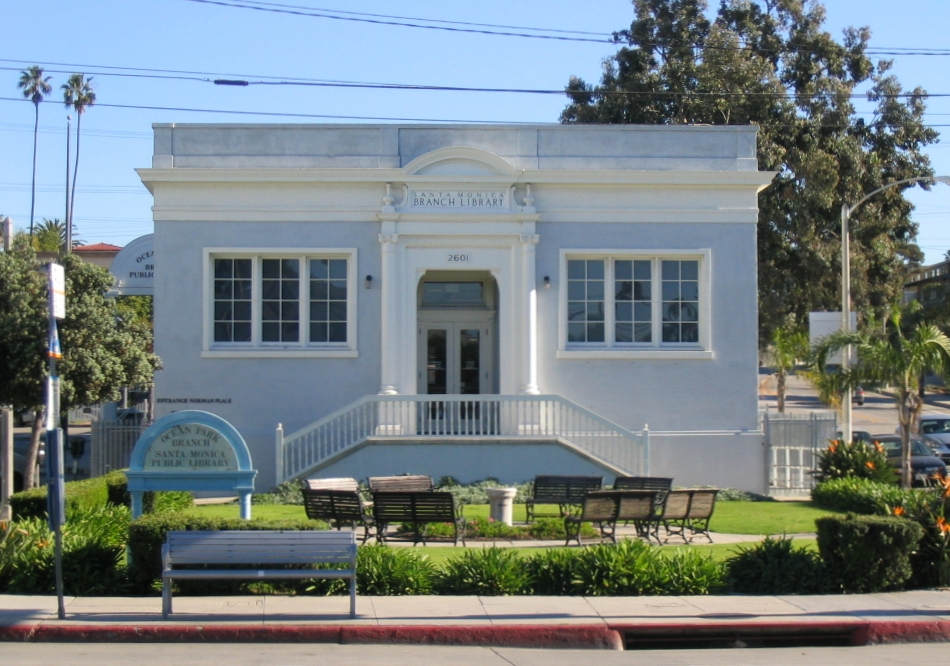
Ocean Park Branch library, an original Carnegie library, July 2009

In December 1916, the commissioners of Santa Monica selected the site for the Ocean Park branch Carnegie library at 2601 Main Street. The library was funded by a $12,500 grant from the Carnegie Corporation. The library was opened to the public on February 15, 1918. The library is one of the remaining pieces of the Carnegie legacy in Southern California. During World War II, the basement of the library was converted to a room for teens. It was also a place run by a temporary United Service Organization (USO) during the war. The city Landmarks Commission designated it as a Santa Monica historic landmark on May 3, 1977.

On March 27, 1943, the Aragon Ballroom opened for business. The Aragon Ballroom was on Lick Pier in the Ocean Park district. It was destroyed by fire on May 26, 1970.

== See also ==
- Aragon Ballroom (Ocean Park) in Santa Monica)
- Fraser's Million Dollar Pier
- List of City of Santa Monica Designated Historic Landmarks
- History of Santa Monica
