= Benjamin Arkeketa =

American painter

- Thíⁿje P^óšge
- Born: February 27, 1928; Red Rock, Oklahoma, US
- Died: March 20, 2002 (aged 74); Tulsa, Oklahoma, US
- Occupation: painter
- Spouse: Mary Elizabeth Freeman

Benjamin Arkeketa, also called Thinga-Ja-Bus-Ka (Iowa-Oto: Thíⁿje P^óšge, "Bushy Tail") (February 27, 1928 – March 20, 2002), was an American painter from the Oto-Missouria Tribe. He was a member of the "Che" Buffalo Clan, and his paternal great-great-grandfather was Chief George Arkeketa. Influenced by Brummett Echohawk and Acee Blue Eagle, Arkeketa was known for his paintings related to his tribal archaeology and ethnology as well as Christian philosophy.

== Personal life ==
Born in Red Rock, Oklahoma on February 27, 1928, Arkeketa was the son of George B. and Edna Jones Arkeketa, both of the Oto-Missouria tribe. He graduated from Chilocco Indian School in Newkirk, Oklahoma. In 1948 Arkeketa enlisted in the United States Marine Corps and fought in the Korean War for four years. He was welcomed home by his tribe with a traditional victory feast and war dances.

Arkeketa was also a musician and champion straight dancer at pow-wows. He served for a time as a tribal council member. Arkeketa worked for some time at the Department of Human Services for the state of Oklahoma.

In 1954 he married Mary Elizabeth Freeman, and the couple had five daughters. In 2003 his granddaughter Cody Harjo was named Miss Indian Nations at the United Tribes International Powwow.

Arkeketa died in Tulsa, Oklahoma, on March 20, 2002.
