= Missouria =

Native American tribe

Nutachi

Total population
- fewer than 1,393

Regions with significant populations
- United States (Oklahoma, previously Missouri)

Languages
- English, formerly Chiwere

Religion
- Christianity (Protestant and Roman Catholic), Native American Church

Related ethnic groups
- Otoe, Iowa, and Ho-Chunk

- People: Niútachi
- Language: Niútachi ich'é, Hand Talk
- Country: Niútachi Máyaⁿ

The Missouria or Missouri (in their own language, Nutachi, also spelled Niutachi) are a Native American tribe that originated in the Great Lakes region of what is now the United States before European contact. The tribe belongs to the Chiwere division of the Siouan-Cawtaban language family, together with the Ho-Chunk, Iowa, and Otoe.

Throughout the 17th and 18th centuries, the tribe lived in bands near the mouth of the Grand River at its confluence with the Missouri River, near the mouth of the Missouri at its confluence with the Mississippi River, and in what is now Saline County, Missouri. Since Indian removal, they live primarily in Oklahoma. They are federally recognized as the Otoe-Missouria Tribe of Indians, headquartered in Red Rock, Oklahoma.

== Name ==
French colonists adapted a form of the Illinois language-name for the people: Wimihsoorita, which translates as "One who has dugout canoes". In their own language, the Missouri call themselves Nutachi, also spelled Niutachi, meaning "People of the River Mouth." The Osage called them the Waçux¢a, and the Quapaw called them the Wa-ju'-xd¢ǎ.

The state of Missouri and the Missouri River are named for the tribe.

== History ==
=== 16th century ===
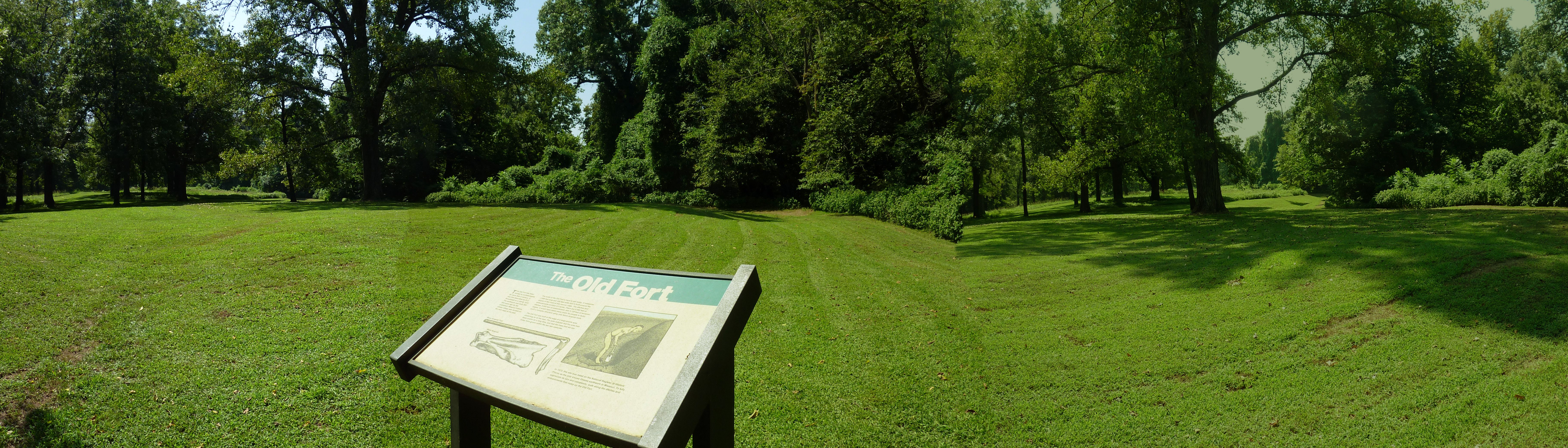
Remains of the Missouria Old Fort earthworks (1400–1752 CE) at Van Meter State Park

The tribe's oral history tells that they once lived north of the Great Lakes, where they were part of a larger tribe that included the Ho-Chunk, Iowa, and Otoe. They began migrating south in the 16th century. They have been connected with the Oneota culture.

=== 17th century ===
The beginning of the 17th century, the Missouria lived near the confluence of the Grand and Missouri rivers, where they settled through the 18th century. Later, their oral history says that they split from the Otoe tribe, which belongs to the same Chiwere language, because of a love affair between the children of two tribal chiefs.

The 17th century brought hardships to the Missouria. The Sauk and Meskwaki frequently attacked them. Their society was even more disrupted by the high fatalities from epidemics of smallpox and other Eurasian infectious diseases that accompanied contact with Europeans. The French explorer Jacques Marquette contacted the tribe in 1673 and paved the way for trade with the French.

=== 18th century ===
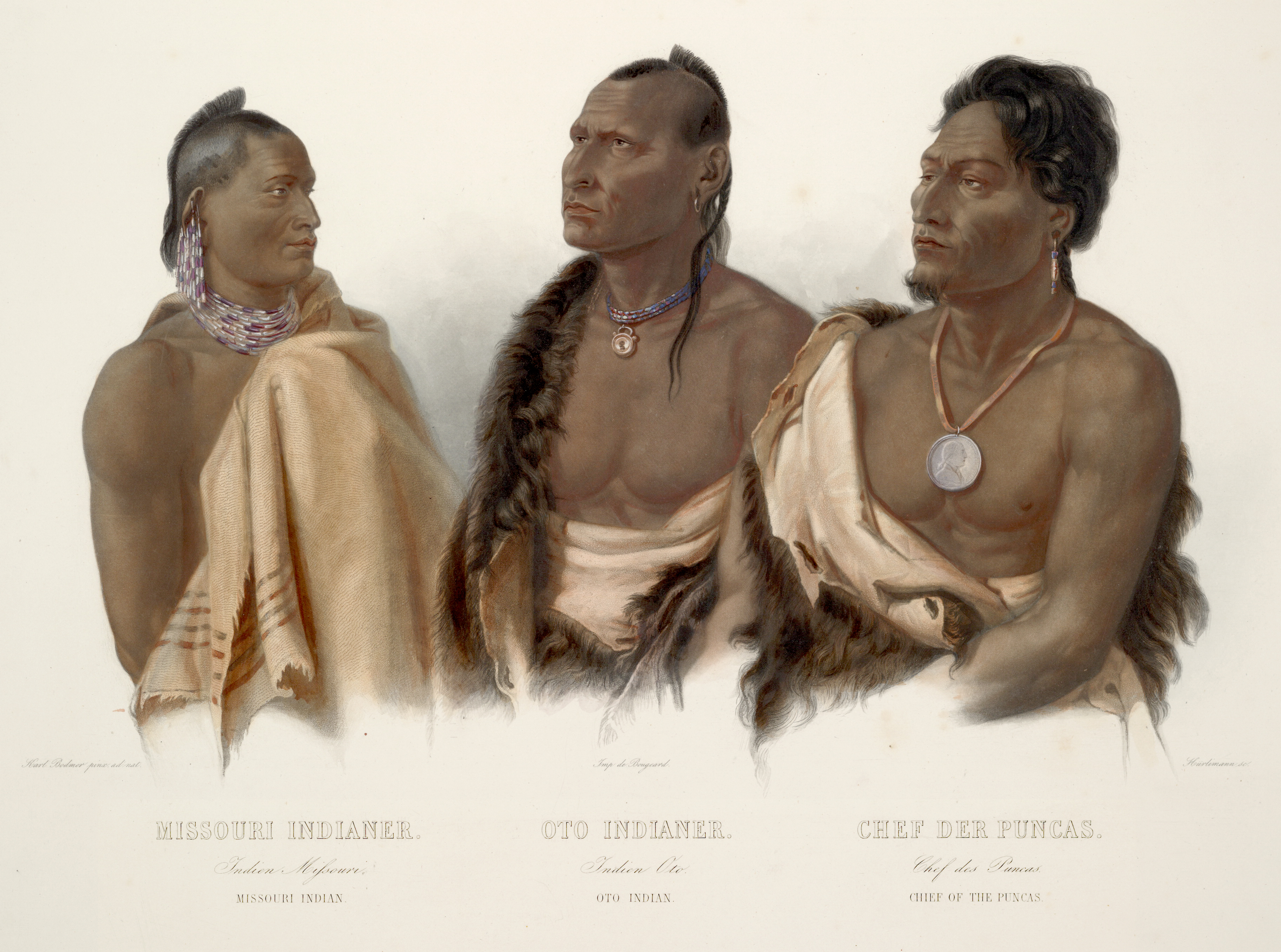
Mahinkacha ('Maker of Knives'), a Missouria warrior on the left, painting by Karl Bodmer based on sketches from 1833–1834

The Missouria migrated west of the Missouri River into Osage territory. During this time, they acquired horses and hunted bison. The French explorer Étienne de Veniard, Sieur de Bourgmont visited the people in the early 1720s. He married the daughter of a Missouria chief. They settled nearby, and Veniard created alliances with the people. He built Fort Orleans in 1723 as a trading post near present-day Brunswick, Missouri. It was occupied until 1726.

In 1730, an attack by the Sauk and Meskwaki tribes nearly destroyed the Missouria, killing hundreds. Most survivors reunited with the Otoe, while some joined the Osage and Kansa. After a smallpox outbreak in 1829, fewer than 100 Missouria survived, and they all joined the Otoe.

=== 19th century ===
They signed treaties with the US government in 1830 and 1854 to cede their lands in Missouri. They relocated to the Otoe-Missouria reservation, created on the Big Blue River at the Kansas-Nebraska border. The US pressured the two tribes into ceding more lands in 1876 and 1881.

In 1880, the tribes split into two factions, the Coyote, who were traditionalists, and the Quakers, who were assimilationists. The Coyote settled on the Iowa Reservation in Indian Territory. The Quakers negotiated a small separate reservation in Indian Territory. By 1890, most of the Coyote band rejoined the Quakers on their reservation.

=== 20th century ===
Missouri.

Under the Dawes Act, by 1907 members of the tribes were registered and allotted individual plots of land per household. The U.S. declared any excess communal land of the tribe as "surplus" and sold it to European-American settlers. The tribe merged with the Otoe tribe.

The Curtis Act disbanded tribal courts and governmental institutions to assimilate Native people into mainstream American society and prepare Indian Territory for statehood, but the tribe created their own court system in 1900. The Missouria were primarily farmers in the early 20th century. After oil was discovered on their lands in 1912, the U.S. government forced many of the tribe off their allotments.

=== 21st century ===
Today, Missouri are part of the Otoe-Missouria Tribe of Indians. They hold the Otoe-Missouria encampment each July and host social dances and ceremonies at the Otoe-Missouria Cultural Center in Red Rock, Oklahoma.

== Population ==
According to the ethnographer James Mooney, the population of the tribe was about 200 families in 1702; 1000 people in 1780; 300 in 1805; 80 in 1829, when they were living with the Otoe; and 13 in 1910. Since then, their population numbers are combined with those of the Otoe.

== Notable people ==
- Truman Washington Dailey
