= Truman Washington Dailey =

Last Native speaker of Otoe-Missouria

- Má^ši Máñi and Súŋe Hgá
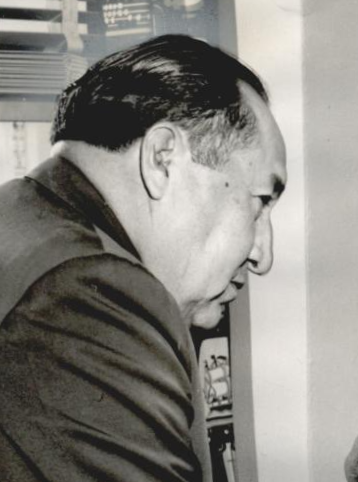
- Dailey in 1955
- Born: Truman Washington Dailey; October 19, 1898; Otoe-Missouria reservation, Oklahoma Territory
- Died: December 16, 1996 (aged 98)
- Citizenship: Otoe-Missouria Tribe of Indians and U.S.
- Education: Oklahoma A&M College
- Known for: Last speaker of the Chiwere language, peyote roadman
- Notable work: Chiwere language preservation

Truman Washington Dailey (October 19, 1898 – December 16, 1996), also known as Mashi Manyi and Sunge Hka, was the last native speaker of the Otoe–Missouria dialect of Chiwere, a Native American language. He was a member of the Otoe–Missouria Tribe of Indians.

== Name ==
Dailey was known in Chiwere as Má^ši Máñi ("Soaring High", anglicized as Mashi Manyi) and Súŋe Hgá ("White Horse", anglicized as Sunge Hka).

== Early life ==
He was born on October 19, 1898, on the Otoe–Missouria reservation in Oklahoma Territory. His father, George Washington Dailey, was a member of the Eagle Clan of the Missouria and belonged to a traditionalist group within the combined Otoe–Missouria tribe called the "Coyote Band". As a result, Truman Dailey was well-versed in the traditional lore of his people. Dailey attended Oklahoma A&M College until 1922. While at Oklahoma A&M, Dailey performed in the college band and was made a member of Kappa Kappa Psi band fraternity. In 1928, he married Lavina Koshiway, daughter of Jonathan Koshiway, who was one of the founders of the Native American Church. By 1938, Truman and Lavina were conducting their own church services, where he was considered a Road Man (ceremonial leader). During the next decade Dailey served in administrative offices in the Native American Church of Oklahoma and the newly formed Native American Church of the United States.

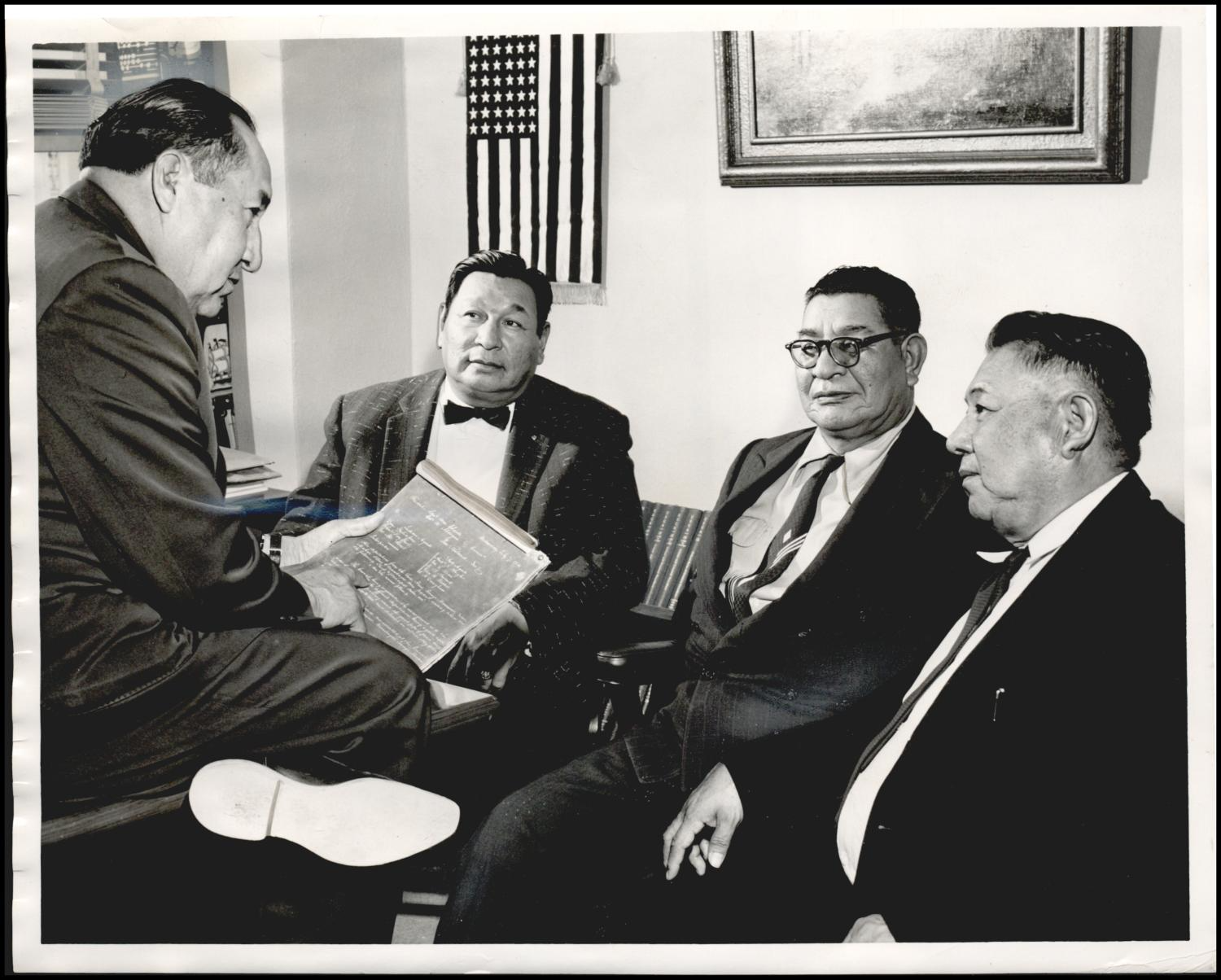
Otoe–Missouri Executive Council reviewing a treaty from 1830 (1955): Truman W. Dailey is on the far left.

He was first elected Secretary/Treasurer of the Native American Church of Oklahoma in 1939, and became Secretary of the Native American Church of the United States when it was officially formed in 1944.

He also served on the Otoe–Missouria tribal Business Committee as Secretary from 1943 until 1959 when he and his wife decided to sell their farm in Oklahoma and move to California.

== Later life and career ==
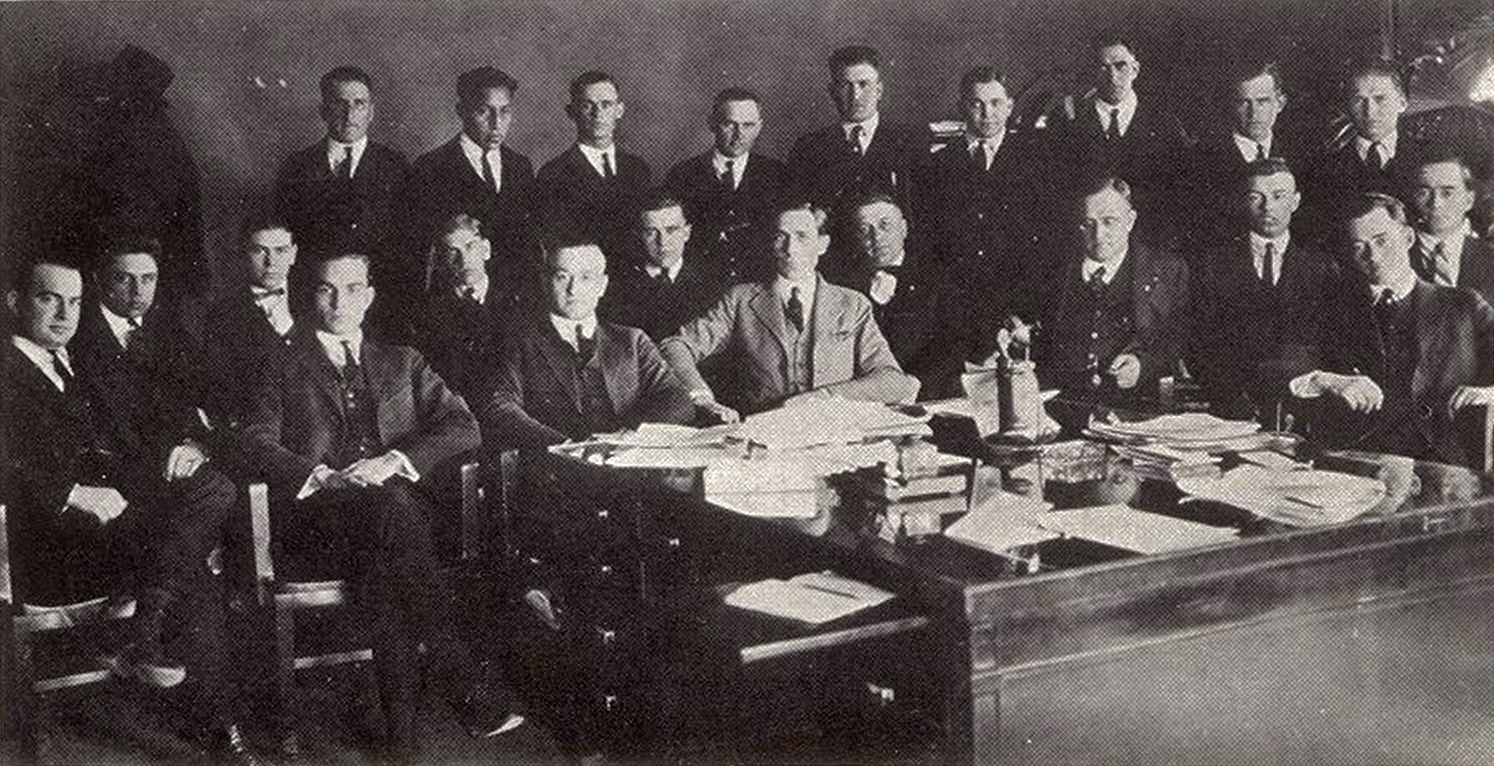
Oklahoma A & M Colleges Kappa Kappa Psi fraternity, 1922. Truman is standing as number two from the left.

During the 1960s, Dailey worked at Disneyland as the announcer for the American Indian programs. When Walt Disney hired him, he allowed Dailey to use one of his own Indian names in the show, simply changing it to "Chief White Horse". During this time he also appeared on The Steve Allen Show. After leaving California, he and Lavina returned to Oklahoma in 1970, where he taught the Otoe–Missouria language in tribal classes and later served as a consultant for the University of Missouri native language project, in order to record Otoe–Missouria for posterity.

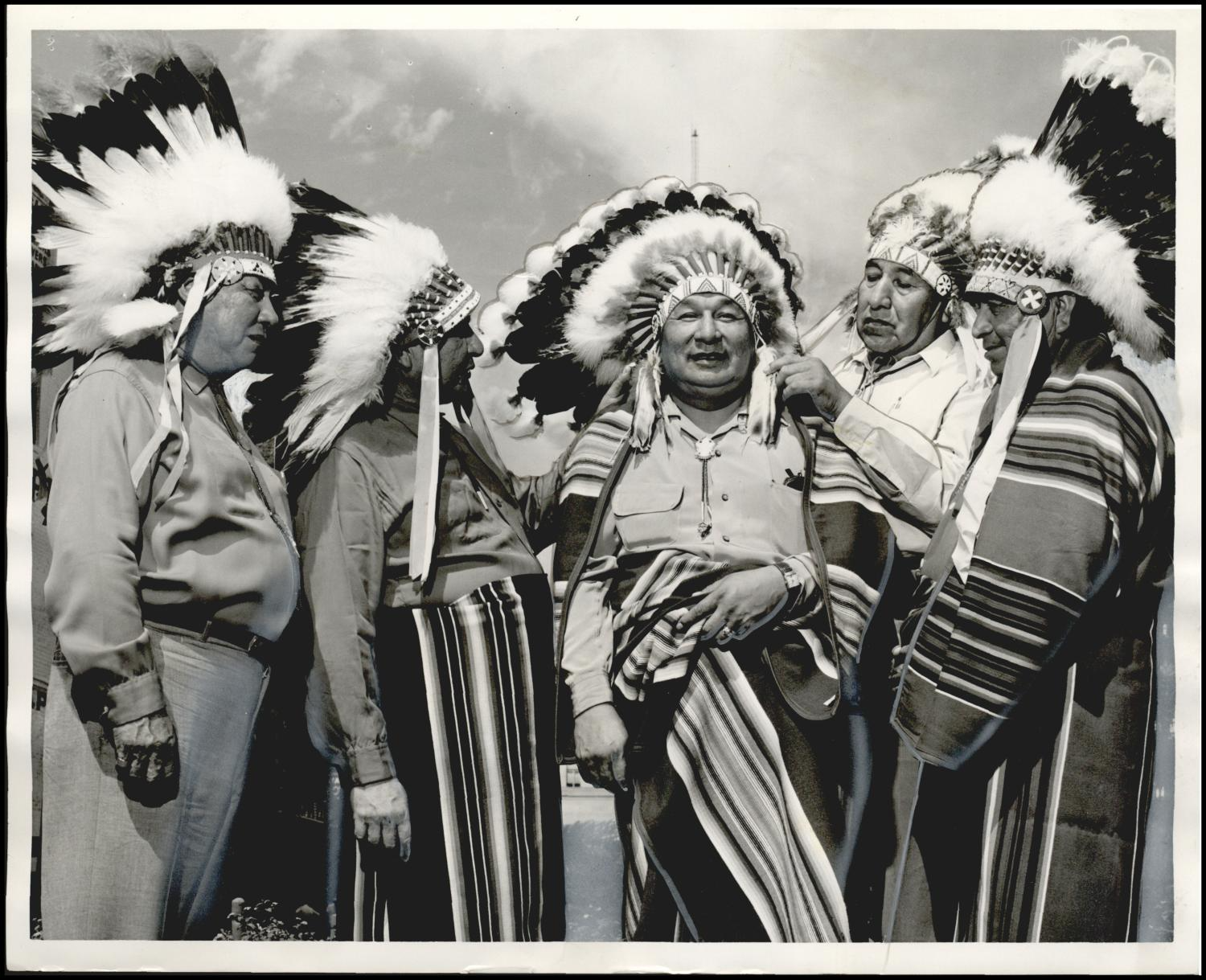
Otoe–Missouria Council Members getting ready for the 1956 powwow in Red Rock, OK, L to R: Murray Littlecrow, Joseph T. Young, Francis Pipestem, Truman W. Dailey, and William Atkins Jr.

Dailey remained a vocal advocate of Native American ceremonial rights. In 1974, he testified in Washington, DC, and in Omaha, NE, regarding the ceremonial use of feathers and other natural objects in opposition to the Migratory Bird Law. Dailey also testified before the United States Senate Select Committee on Indian Affairs in 1978 (Senate Joint Resolution 102). The resulting legislation, the American Indian Religious Freedom Act, was signed into law by President Carter but was only partially successful, so that in 1992, Dailey, now 93 years of age, was called upon once again to give testimony to the Senate committee. This time the subject was the Native American Church's most notable characteristic, the ceremonial use of peyote. The resulting amendment to the Act legalized the use of peyote for official Native American religious purposes. The following year, the University of Missouri at Columbia awarded him an honorary Doctor of Humane Letters. Lavina Koshiway Dailey had died in 1988. Truman Dailey died on December 16, 1996, and was buried next to her in the Otoe–Missouria Tribal Cemetery.

== Sources ==
- "Truman Dailey" at Ioway Cultural Institute, URL accessed 05/27/06
- Whitman, William (1937). The Oto. New York, NY: Columbia University.
- Chapman, Berlin Basil (1965). The Otoes and Missourias. Oklahoma City, OK: Times Journal Publ. Co.
- Stanley, Lori A. (1993). The Indian Path of Life: A life history of Truman Washington Dailey of the Otoe-Missouria tribe. Columbia, MO: University of Missouri.
