= Chiwere language =

Siouan language of the Midwest

Chiwere
- Báxoje-Jíwere-Nyútʼachi; Báxoje ich'é Jíwere ich'é
- Pronunciation: [b̥aꜜxodʒɛ itʃʼeꜜ] [d̥ʒiꜜweɾɛ itʃʼeꜜ]
- Native to: United States
- Region: Oklahoma, Missouri, and Kansas
- Ethnicity: 1,150 Iowa, Otoe, Missouria (2007)
- Extinct: 1996, with the death of Truman Washington Dailey <40 semi-fluent speakers (2009)
- Language family: Siouan-Cawtaban: Siouan; Mississippi Valley; Chiwere–Winnebago; Chiwere

Language codes
- ISO 639-3: iow
- Glottolog: iowa1245
- ELP: Chiwere
- Linguasphere: 64-AAC-c
- Chiwere is classified as Extinct by the UNESCO Atlas of the World's Languages in Danger.

- People: Iowa (Báxoje), Otoe (Jiwére), Missouria (Ñiútachi)
- Language: Ich'é, Hand Talk
- Country: Báxoje Máyaⁿ, Jíwere Máyaⁿ, Ñút’achi Máyaⁿ

Chiwere (also called Iowa–Otoe–Missouria or Báxoje-Jíwere-Nyútʼach) is a Siouan language originally spoken by the Missouria, Otoe, and Iowa peoples, who originated in the Great Lakes region but later moved throughout the Midwest and plains. The language is closely related to Ho-Chunk, also known as Winnebago.

Non-Native Christian missionaries first documented Chiwere in the 1830s, but since then not much material has been published about the language. Chiwere suffered a steady decline after extended European American contact in the 1850s, and by 1940 the language had almost totally ceased to be spoken.

"Tciwere itce" (in the Otoe dialect) and "Tcekiwere itce" (in the Iowa dialect) translate to "To speak the home dialect." The name "Chiwere" is said to originate from a person meeting a stranger in the dark. If a stranger in the dark challenged a person to identify their self, that person might respond "I am Tci-we-re" (Otoe) or "I am Tce-ki-we-re" (Iowa), which translates to "I am belonging to the people of this land" or "I am belonging to those dwelling here."

== Names ==
The Iowa tribe refers to their language as Báxoje ich'é or Bah Kho Je (pronounced [b̥aꜜxodʒɛ itʃʼeꜜ]). The Otoe–Missouria dialect is called Jíwere ich'é (pronounced [d̥ʒiꜜweɾɛ itʃʼeꜜ]). The spelling Chiwere, used mostly by linguists, derives from the fact that the language has an aspiration distinction rather than a voice distinction (see the phonology section below), so that the unaspirated stops /b̥ d̥ d̥ʒ ɡ̊/ are variably voiced [b d dʒ ɡ] or unvoiced [p t tʃ k]. Although [tʃ] is a valid pronunciation of the first sound of Jiwere ~ Chiwere, it may mislead English speakers into pronouncing it [tʃʰ].

Similarly, a common folk etymology of Báxoje is "dusty noses", based on the misunderstanding of the first syllable bá as pá, or "nose". However, the Iowa Tribe of Oklahoma says that Bah-Kho-Je means "grey snow", due to their winter lodges being covered with snow that is stained grey by fire smoke.

== Status ==
The last two fluent speakers died in the winter of 1996, and only a handful of semi-fluent speakers remain, all of whom are elderly, making Chiwere critically endangered. As of 2006, an estimated four members of the Otoe–Missouria Tribe of Indians still speak the language, while 30 members of the Iowa Tribe of Oklahoma speak their language. The Iowa Tribe of Oklahoma has sponsored language workshops in the past and hopes to host more in the future. They have provided tribal elders with recording devices to collect Chiwere words and songs. A 2012 NSF grant was used to provide digital access to existing audio recordings of fluent speakers. The Third Annual Otoe–Missouria Language and Culture Day was planned for September 2012. The Otoe–Missouria Tribe of Indians is establishing a language program in conjunction with the University of Oklahoma Native American Studies Department.

=== Classes ===
The Otoe–Missouria Tribe of Oklahoma's Otoe Language Program teaches weekly classes in Oklahoma City, Oklahoma, and Red Rock, Oklahoma.

== Phonology ==
The phoneme inventory of Chiwere consists of approximately 33 consonants, and five vowel qualities (three of which occur as nasalized).

=== Consonants ===
Chiwere Consonant Inventory
		Labial	Interdental	Dental	Palatal	Velar	Glottal
Plosive	Voiceless	p		t	tʃ	k	ʔ
Plosive	Aspirated	pʰ		tʰ	tʃʰ	kʰ	
Plosive	Ejective	pʼ		tʼ	tʃʼ	kʼ	
Fricative	Voiceless		θ	s ~ ʃ		x	h
Fricative	Voiced		ð				
Fricative	Ejective		θʼ	sʼ		xʼ	
Nasal		m		n	ɲ	ŋ	
Approximant		w		ɾ	j		

Voiceless stop sounds /p, t, tʃ, k/ may be heard as voiced [b, d, dʒ, ɡ] in final position. The phoneme /ɾ/ has a number of variants and allophones. It can appear as a dental tap or flap [ɾ] (especially word-medially), as an alveolar fricative [r], as an (inter)dental fricative [ð], as a lateral [l], as a nasal [n], or as a voiced dental plosive [d]. The velar nasal phoneme /ŋ/ does not occur word-initially, being confined to "medial position after a nasal vowel".

==== Phoneme combinations ====
In languages a certain clusters of phonemes show up in particular environments within a word. According to William Whitman's research of Chiwere, approximately 23 known consonant clusters exist that are word medial, and approximately 14 of these show up word initially or word medially. In this research Whitman found that the stop + stop consonant cluster čd, as in áčda ('then'), shows up in the word medial position but not as a word initial phoneme cluster.

The stop + spirant clusters ʔθ, ʔs, and ʔh all show up word initially and word medially, whereas the stop + semivowel clusters dw and gw only show up word medially. The stop + liquid clusters bl and gl show up word initially and word medially. Spirant + stop clusters generally appear in both word initial and word medial position, these clusters include θg, sǰ, sg, hd, and hg, however the spirant + stop clusters sd and xd only appear word medially. These are all the spirant + stop clusters accounted for in the research of William Whitman, however, the spirant + stop cluster hk has been found to exist word medially, as in chéthka ('domestic cow').

According to Whitman's, research two spirant + nasal consonant clusters that have been found, which are hm, as in sáhmã ('seven') and hn, as in láhnũwe ('calumet'), however Whitman does account that hñ is a combination which appears as a future tense suffix. After reviewing further data, the cluster hñ has been found in the word medial position, as in péhñi ('whiskey') and thus appears to be another possible spirant + nasal consonant combination.

The stop + semivowel consonant clusters θw, xw, and hw all appear to be restricted to the word medial environment, whereas the stop + semivowel consonant cluster sw appears to be the only stop + semivowel known to show up both word initially, as in swá̃la ('to be soft') and baswá ('to cut piece off'). The stop + liquid phoneme clusters θl, sl, and xl have all been found in the word initial and word medial environments.

=== Cluster metamorphosis and phenomenon ===
An interesting analysis of the Chiwere language has shown that the spirant + stop consonant cluster hg is the more commonly used pronunciation of the spirant + stop cluster θg and that the hg cluster may be replacing the θg altogether.

In William Whitman's research, the spirant + stop combination xd, with the one given example used in this journal being iblí̃xdo ('blackbird'), is mentioned as being an error for the spirant + stop combination hd. But the spirant + stop combination xd has also been found in the words chéxdó ('buffalo bull'), náxda ('sour'), and náxdage ('kick'). With this data we can see that the consonant cluster xd is a possible combination and can show up in word medial position.

=== Vowels ===
Chiwere has five oral vowel phonemes, /a e i o u/, and three nasal vowel phonemes, /ã ĩ ũ/. Vowel length is distinctive as well.

== Grammar ==
Chiwere grammar is agglutinative; its verbal complex is central to the structure of the language. Verbs are formed by addition various affixes to a verb stem, each of which corresponds to a part of speech, such as a preposition, pronoun, case marker and so forth. Concepts such as possession, reflexivity and grammatical number, as well subject-object relation and case (including nine instrumental prefixes) are also expressed via affixing. In this way, large, complete sentences can be formed out of a single complex word.

Aside from its complex verbal morphology, Chiwere differs from English in a number of significant ways. There are separate male and female registers, and interrogatives are formed with the question particle je, though this is omitted in informal speech. Finally, Chiwere word order is subject-object-verb, in contrast to English SVO order.

=== Verbal complex ===
The verbal complex is formed of preverbal and postverbal affixes, with preverbal affixes communicating positional, instrumental and pronominal elements. These are added to a verb stem, which can be mono-, duo- or polysyllabic, and either agent (transitive) or patient (intransitive). Most verb stems are passive. Altogether, the Chiwere verb complex is arranged as follows:

[wa- pronoun] [wa- directional] [positional] [-wa/ri- pronouns] [ha-/ra- pronouns] [reflexive] [possession] [gi- directional] [instrumental] STEM [pronoun suffix] [causative]

=== Positional prefixes ===
Positional prefixes occupy the first position in the verbal complex. These prefixes refer to the location or direction of the verb's action:

- a- 'on, upon, over'
- i- 'at, to, by'
- u- 'in, within, into'

=== Pronominal prefixes ===
Chiwere distinguishes three persons – first, second and inclusive, which functions as an inclusive first person plural. Each person has an agent (subject) and patient (object) form. The agent forms mark the subjects of active verbs, whereas the patient forms mark the objects of active verbs and the subjects of passive verbs, making Chiwere, like many other Siouan languages, active-stative. Third person forms as they exist in English are not directly marked. Following are the subject and object forms of the pronominal prefixes:

	Subject			Object		
	SG	DU	PL	SG	DU	PL
1	ha-	hiⁿ-	hiⁿ-…wi	hiⁿ- ~ mi-	wa-wa-	wa-wa-…wi
2	ra-	—	ra-…wi	ri-	—	ri-…wi
3	∅	…wi	…ñe	∅	wa-	wa-…wi

The inclusive object form is spelled wa-wa because it can be separated by the positional prefixes. The 3SG is not marked; the 2DU form does not exist.

=== Wa- prefix ===
This prefix, perhaps best translated as "something", occurs before every other verbal element except for the pronominal hi-, and approximates the English third person plural object of a transitive verb. Additionally, the prefix can be used as a dummy pronoun to make transitive verbs intransitive; these verbal forms are often used as nouns, and this prefix is thus the general method of forming nouns from verb stems. There are several intransitive verbs that take the wa- prefix idiomatically, wherein the prefix has no literal meaning.

=== Reflexive prefix ===
Verbs are made reflexive by the ki- prefix; the reduplicated form kiki- expresses reciprocity. Thus:

- Uhákigisaⁿ 'I helped myself'
- Ukikisa ke 'They helped each other'

A number of verbs that are non-reflexive in English take the reflexive prefix in Chiwere.

=== Directional prefixes ===
These three prefixes serve to indicate an indirect object and as such are grouped together, even though they do not occupy the same position within the verbal complex:

- wa- indicates that the action moves away from a third point not occupied by the speaker
- gi- indicates that the action moves towards a third point and communicates the English prepositions of to, for or concerning
- gra- (Note: Whitman uses /l/, while this article and GoodTracks use /ɾ/) indicates that the action reverts towards the subject and is used to form possessive constructions

=== Instrumental prefixes ===
There are nine separate prefixes that indicate instrumentality, all of which change passive verbs into active.

- wa- by pushing with the hand
- gi- by pushing or striking with a held object
- ru-/ri- by hand
- na- by means of the feet or a machine
- ra- by means of the mouth or teeth
- bo- by means of blow or blast
- ba- by cutting
- da- because of heating or freezing

=== Causative suffix ===
The causative, wherein the subject causes or makes something else to do or be something, is expressed via the suffix -hi. The verbs prefixed by da- are intransitive and are made transitive with the -hi suffix.

=== Tense ===
"Tense" in Chiwere can be divided into present/past and future. Present and past tenses are unmarked in the language, and are distinguished by actual statements of time using words like "yesterday" or "today". The future tense is indicated with the particle hnye, which follows the verb.

=== Personal pronouns ===
Chiwere is a pro-drop language; once the subject of the sentence has been established, it can be omitted.

- First Person: mi'e (sing.), hi'e (inc.)
- Second Person: ri'e
- Third Person: alé

=== Negation ===
Statements are negated with the particle skunyi, which follows the verb.

=== Commands ===
Commands are formed using the simple verb stem plus a gender-specific particle – le for male speakers and lé for female speakers.

== See also ==
- Truman Washington Dailey (Otoe–Missoura, 1898–1996), the last fully fluent native speaker
