= Otoe–Missouria Tribe of Indians =

Native American tribe in Oklahoma

Jíwere-Nyútʼachi
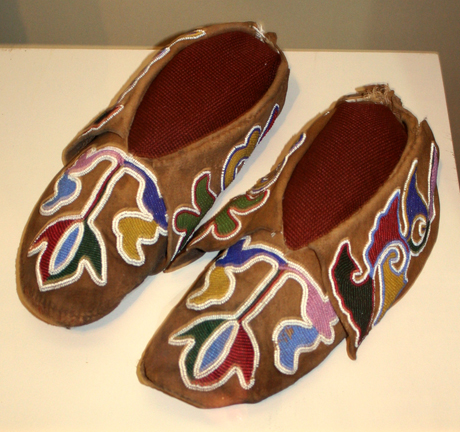
- Otoe–Missouria men's moccasins, ca. 1880, Oklahoma, Oklahoma History Center

Total population
- 3,049 (2011)

Regions with significant populations
- Oklahoma, United States

Languages
- Chiwere language, English

Religion
- tribal religion, Native American Church, Christianity

Related ethnic groups
- Other Chiwere-speaking peoples (Ho-Chunk, Iowa)

The Otoe–Missouria Tribe of Indians is a federally recognized tribe, located in Oklahoma. The tribe is made up of Otoe and Missouria peoples. Their language, the Chiwere language, is part of the Siouan–Catawban language family.

== History ==
=== 16th century ===
The Otoe (Jiwere) and Missouria (Nutachi) tribes both originated in Wisconsin in the Great Lakes region. They had once been a single tribe that included the ancestors of the Ho-Chunk, Winnebago, and Iowa tribes. In the 16th century, the Iowa, Otoe, and Missouria broke away and moved to the south and west. By the late 17th century, the Missouria had settled near the Missouri and Grand rivers in what became Missouri.

=== 17th century ===
Meanwhile, the Otoe settled along what is now the Iowa–Minnesota border. They first came into contact with Europeans in late 17th century. Jacques Marquette, the French explorer, included them on a 1673 map, placing the Otoe near the Des Moines and upper Iowa rivers.

=== 18th century ===
In 1700, Pierre Le Moyne d'Iberville wrote that the Otoe and the Iowa lived with the Omaha tribe in territory to the west of the Mississippi and Missouri rivers. After contact and continued pressure by European-Americans, they migrated to the territory of later Nebraska, settling near the Platte River. This area was later set aside for them as the Otoe Reservation.

During the 18th century, the Missouria people suffered from epidemics of new infectious diseases, especially smallpox, which killed many in the tribe. They also lost people to frequent warfare with enemies, such as the Sac and Fox. In 1796, some surviving Missouria joined the Osage and Kaw tribes, while 80 Missouria joined the Otoe.

=== 19th century ===
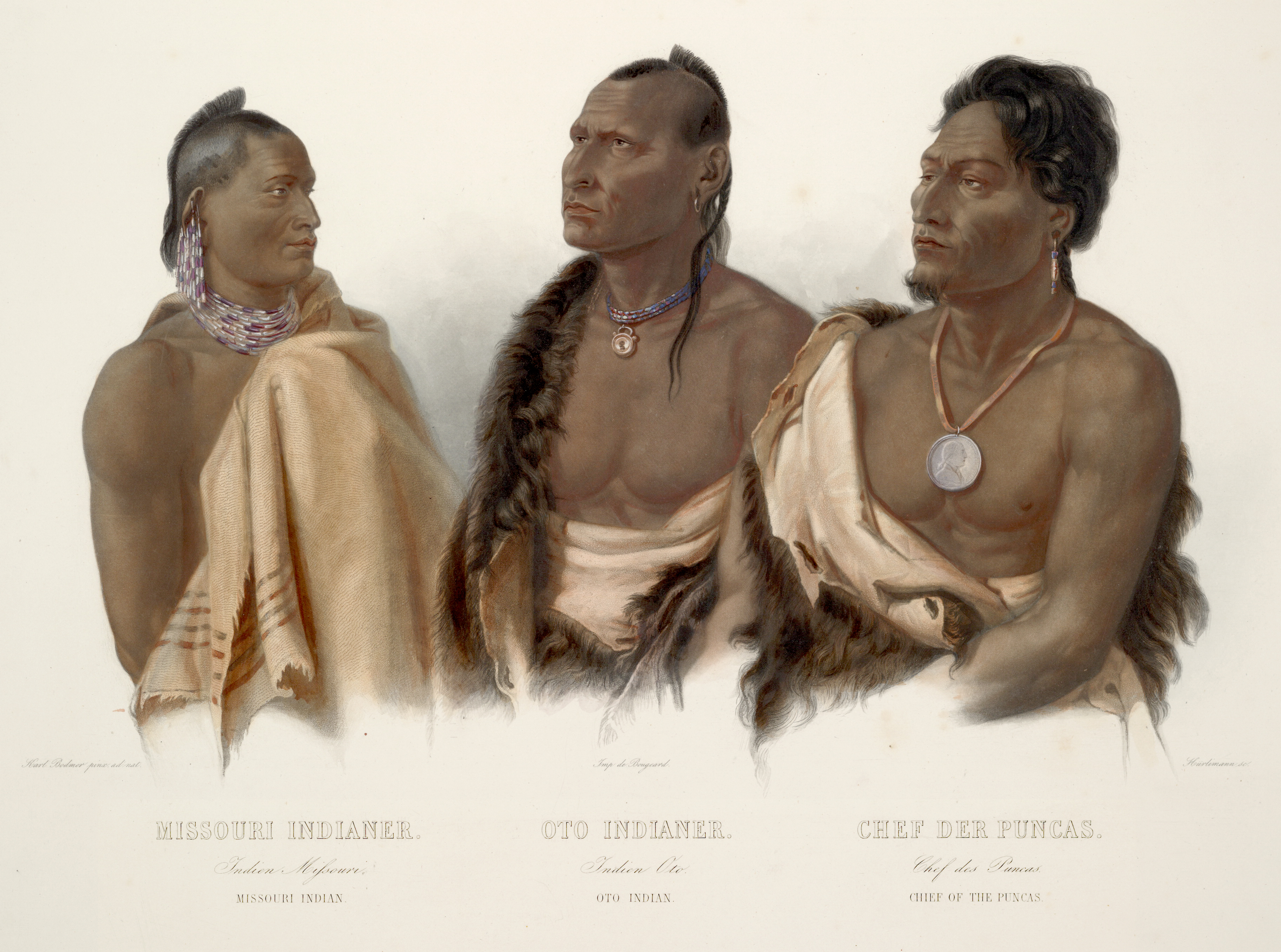
Missouria Indian, Otoe Indian, and Chief of the Ponca, by Karl Bodmer

In the 19th century, the Missouria and the Otoe established permanent villages consisting primarily of earth lodges, but also occasionally tipis and bark lodges. Their joined society was patrilineal and comprised seven to ten clans, each with distinct assigned responsibilities. Tribal citizens had exogamous marriage practices; young people had to marry outside their clan. Each clan had a leader, and together the clan chiefs formed a tribal council. By tradition, the chief of the Bear Clan was the principal leader of the tribes. The men hunted buffalo. The women processed meat and used hides, bone, horn, and other parts of the animals for tools, clothing, etc. In addition, they cultivated and processed such crops as squash, beans, corn, and pumpkins.

In August 1804, the Lewis and Clark Expedition held a council meeting with the tribe near Fort Atkinson, Nebraska, the first such council meeting held with a tribal nation.

Also in 1804, the expedition estimated their population to be 500. Artist George Catlin, who also traveled in their territory in 1833, estimated their population at 1,200. In 1830, there were an estimated 1,500 Otoe–Missouria living together as a group. By 1886, only 334 Otoe–Missouria survived.

The first land cession treaty between the Otoe–Missouria and the United States was in 1830. More treaties followed in 1833, 1836, and 1854. The 1854 Treaty established a reservation on the Kansas-Nebraska border, near the Big Blue River. The tribe split in factions between assimilationists and traditionalists. Quaker missionaries influenced the assimilationist Otoe–Missouria faction, who became known as the Quaker Band. The traditionalists were known as the Coyote Band.

In 1876, the US Congress arranged the sale of 120,000 acres (490 km^{2}) of the Otoe–Missouria reservation. It sold the rest in 1881, when Congress forced the Otoe–Missouria into Indian Territory. The Coyote Band settled on the Sac and Fox reservation, while the Quaker Band settled on their own small, 113-acre (0.46 km^{2}) reservation in present-day Noble and Pawnee counties.

The Coyote Band rejoined the Quaker Band. But under the Dawes Act, in the 1890s, their communal holdings of the reservation were distributed as allotments to individual heads of households. The US declared as surplus any land remaining after allotment, and allowed non-Native Americans to buy it. A total of 514 Otoe–Missourias received individual allotments.

=== 20th century ===
In the mid-20th century the Otoe–Missouria people filed a claim for compensation for their lands lost during the 19th century; their claim was upheld by the Indian Claims Commission and they were paid a settlement in the 1960s.

The tribe ratified its constitution in 1984 in accordance with the Oklahoma Indian Welfare Act.

=== 21st century ===
In 2009, the Environmental Protection Agency awarded $125,000 to the tribe for water quality program.

In 2020, the tribe received a grant from the U.S. Department of Housing and Urban Development as part of their Indian Community Development Block Grant Imminent Threat program.

== Government ==
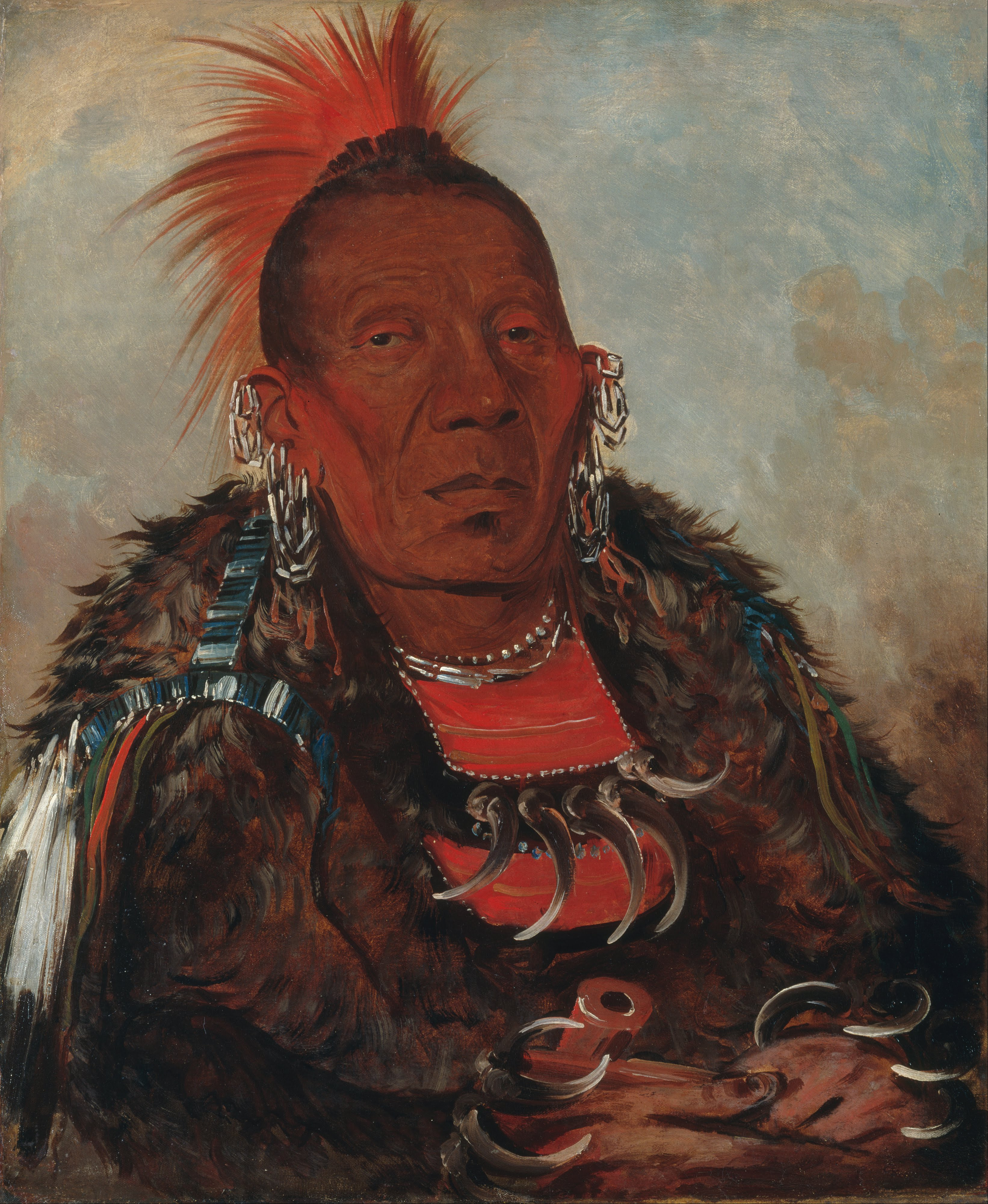
Painting of Wah-ro-née-sah (The Surrounder), Otoe chief, painted by George Catlin, 1832

The Otoe–Missouria Tribe of Indians is headquartered in Red Rock, Oklahoma, and their tribal jurisdictional area is in Noble and Kay counties. In 2011, they had 3,089 enrolled tribal citizens, with the majority living in the state of Oklahoma.

The Tribal Council is the elected governing body of the Otoe–Missouria Tribe. The primary duties of the Tribal Council are to enforce the Tribal laws and policies and to serve as the decision-making authority on budgets and investments. The tribal Council is also the parent body for the tribal administration. Overall, the tribal administration ensures that services, as decided by the Tribal Council, are provided to tribal citizens.

Map of Otoe-Missouria Tribe of Indians' tribal jurisdictional area (OTSA) and nearby jurisdiction areas.

The tribal council consists of seven members elected by secret ballot by qualified voters of the tribe. The terms for each member are staggered and last for three years. There are no term limits. Each Tribal Council member has responsibilities for certain duties, as listed in the Otoe–Missouria Tribe of Indians Constitution.

The Council holds regular meetings monthly in a place and date determined by the members. Currently, the meetings are held in the Council Building at tribal headquarters and are open to the public, except when the Council is in executive session.

As of 2025, the current administration is:

- Chairman: John R. Shotton
- Vice Chair: Susan Arkeketa
- Tribal Secretary: Darrell Kihega
- Tribal Treasurer: Courtney Burgess
- First Member: Wesley J. Hudson
- Second Member: Myra Pickering
- Third Member: Alvin Moore, Sr.

John R. Shotton is currently serving a three-year term. He was the youngest person to ever serve on the tribal council, being first elected when he was 29 years old.

== Economic development ==
The tribe operates its own housing authority and issues tribal vehicle tags. They own two gas stations, two smoke shops, two financial services companies, and five casinos. The estimated annual economic impact of the Otoe–Missouria Tribe is $156.30 million. The Otoe–Missouria casinos are 7 Clans Paradise Casino in Red Rock; First Council Casino in Newkirk, and Lil' Bit of Paradise Casino—Chilocco, also in Newkirk; and Lil' Bit of Paradise Casino—Red Rock, in Red Rock. A new casino was opened in May 2016 in Perry, Oklahoma. The tribe also jointly operates a wind farm along with other tribes.

On May 20, 2019, the National Credit Union Administration presented a federal credit union charter to the Otoe-Missouria Federal Credit Union in Red Rock, Oklahoma. The Otoe-Missouria Federal Credit Union will serve approximately 4,200 citizens and employees of the Otoe-Missouria Tribe.

The Taylor Policy Group concluded that the tribe's efforts to diversify its economy resulted in a massive economic impact to Oklahoma and surrounding areas, including over $45 million in direct compensation to employees across the Tribe's various enterprises.

=== Predatory payday lending ===
In 2010, the tribe partnered with Mark E. Curry to create a high-interest payday loan company, American Web Loan, initially using its sovereign status as a defense against state usury laws until that argument was rejected in court challenges. By 2014, American Web Loan was one of the largest payday lenders in the United States, with a typical annual interest rate of around 700 percent on loans it provided. The company was controlled by Curry, and the tribe received only around one percent of the revenue based on a loan portfolio arrangement with Curry. Curry later testified that between 2010 and September 2016, his private equity firm, MacFarlane Group, made around $110 million from American Web Loan, while the tribe received $8 million. The chair of the tribe, John Shotton, has said the company was an important financial asset for the tribe. In October 2016, the tribe paid Curry $200 million for the MacFarlane Group, which had previously assisted with underwriting and call center support for American Web Loan. The tribe paid for the company by taking out loans in that amount from Curry and one of his companies, and a federal judge ruled in 2019 that Curry had continued to maintain control. After the purchase, the tribe began to receive 3.6 percent of the revenues.

In 2021, the company settled a federal class action lawsuit alleging illegal predatory lending for $182 million, including $86 million in cash and $76 million in loan cancellation. In July 2020, the United States Court of Appeals for the Third Circuit had found that the tribe's payday lender could not compel arbitration to defeat a Racketeer Influenced and Corrupt Organizations Act (RICO) lawsuit brought by the borrowers.

In 2022, another company that had paid the Otoe-Missouria tribe to use its tribal sovereignty to claim exemption from state usury laws paid $44 million to settle a lawsuit for lending at illegally high interest rates.

== Language and culture ==
At most three tribal citizens still speak the Otoe or Chiwere language; however, the tribe has a program to revitalize the language. Language classes are held weekly in Red Rock, Oklahoma and online.

For almost century and a half, since 1881, an annual Otoe–Missouria Encampment is held every third weekend in July near Red Rock, Oklahoma.

The Otoe-Missouria tribe's history is well represented at First Americans Museum in Oklahoma City. Several tribal citizens worked with the museum in order to make sure their culture was accurately represented.

== Education ==
In August 2019, the tribe was among several that chartered Bacone College in Muskogee, Oklahoma, as a tribal college.

The tribes took over control of the college in order to secure federal funding, get it on a stable footing after it ran into financial difficulties, and be able to control its curriculum to serve the needs of their students. It had originally been established in the 19th century in affiliation with the Baptist Church to serve Native American students.

== Notable Otoe–Missouria people ==
- Annette Arkeketa, author
- Benjamin Arkeketa (1928–2002), painter
- Johny Hendricks, former UFC fighter.
- Anna Lee Walters (b. 1946), author and publisher
- Truman Washington Dailey (1898–1996), fluent language speaker, traditionalist
- Della Warrior (b. 1946), president of the Institute of American Indian Arts from 1998 to 2006
