= Straight dance =

Style of Native American pow wow dancing

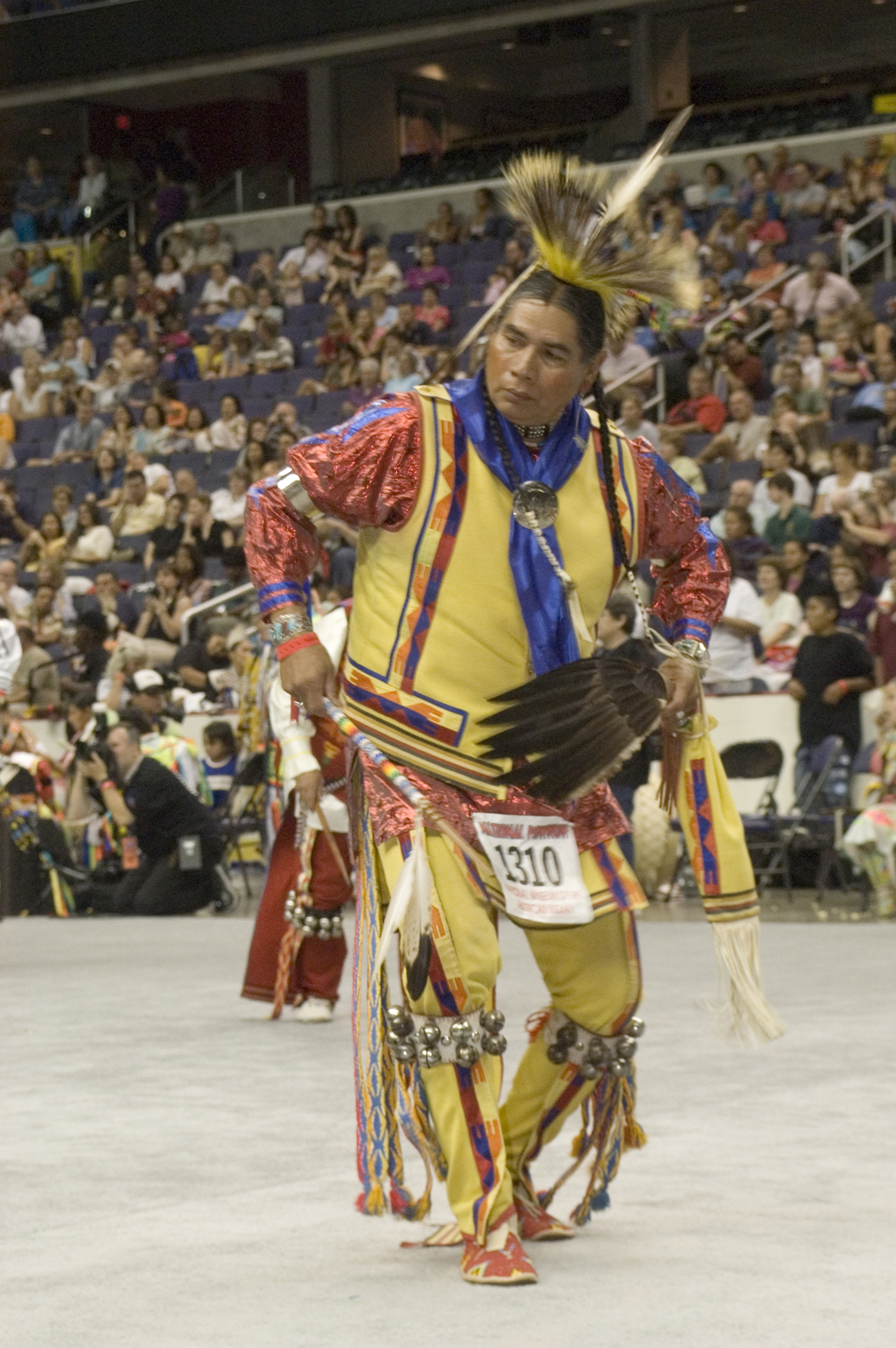
A Straight dancer at the 2005 National Pow Wow

The Straight Dance, also known as Southern Straight Dance or Southern Traditional, is a style of Native American pow wow dancing. The dance recounts the story of hunting or war parties searching for the enemy.

== Origins ==
The Straight Dance is attributed to the Southern Plains tribes in Oklahoma. The Hethuska, a prominent war society of the Poncas, is commonly attributed with the creation of the dance; however, the Pawnee, Omaha, Osage, and Kiowa tribes have sometimes been credited with creating the dance. In the 20th century, when several warrior societies began to dissolve, the purpose of the war dances changed. The Straight Dance evolved from these war dances as a way to keep the tradition and history.

== Description ==
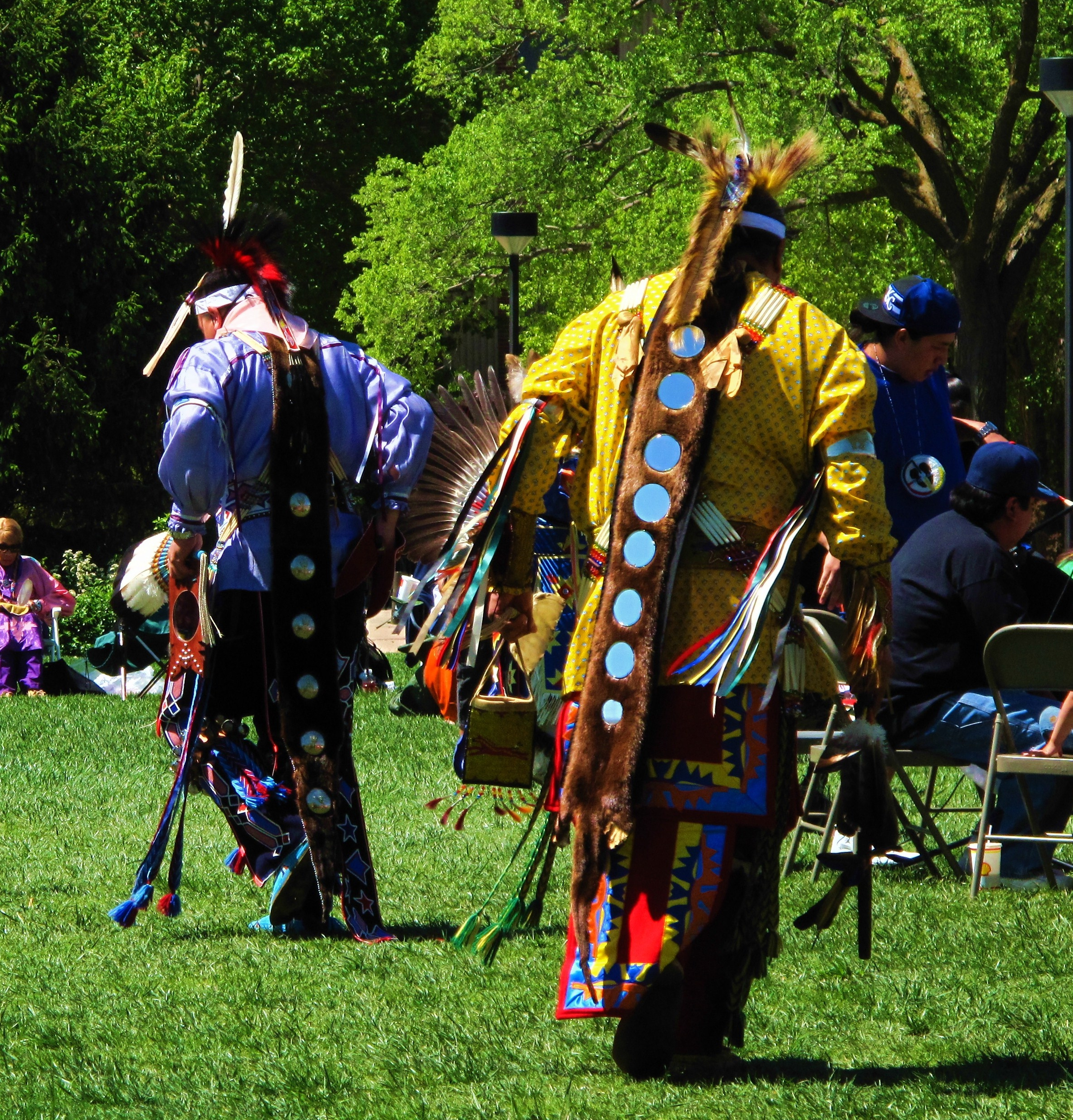
Two Straight dancers wearing otter draggers

The Straight Dance is considered to be more dignified or formal than other pow wow dances. The general steps for the dance involve a "toe-heel" step where the dancer taps the ground with his toe on the first drum beat and then places his whole foot down on the second beat. The dance resembles a hunting or warring party and therefore the dancer must not dance backwards as that would symbolize a retreat from the enemy. Instead they always dance clockwise around the circle. As a Southern dance, it is danced to a Southern Drum.

The Straight Dance regalia consists of a ribbon shirt, tab leggings, aprons, and a headdress (usually a roach or a turban). These are decorated and accessorized with finger-woven garters, beaded belts, vests or bandoliers, German silver armbands, and scarfs. One of the main features of the Straight Dance is an otter dragger, also referred as an otterhide, which hangs from the dancer's back and drags on the ground. It is normally decorated with medals, beadwork, ribbonwork, or feathers. Straight dancers generally carry a fan, mirror board, or tail stick in their hands.
