= Powwow =

Native American and First Nations cultural dance gathering

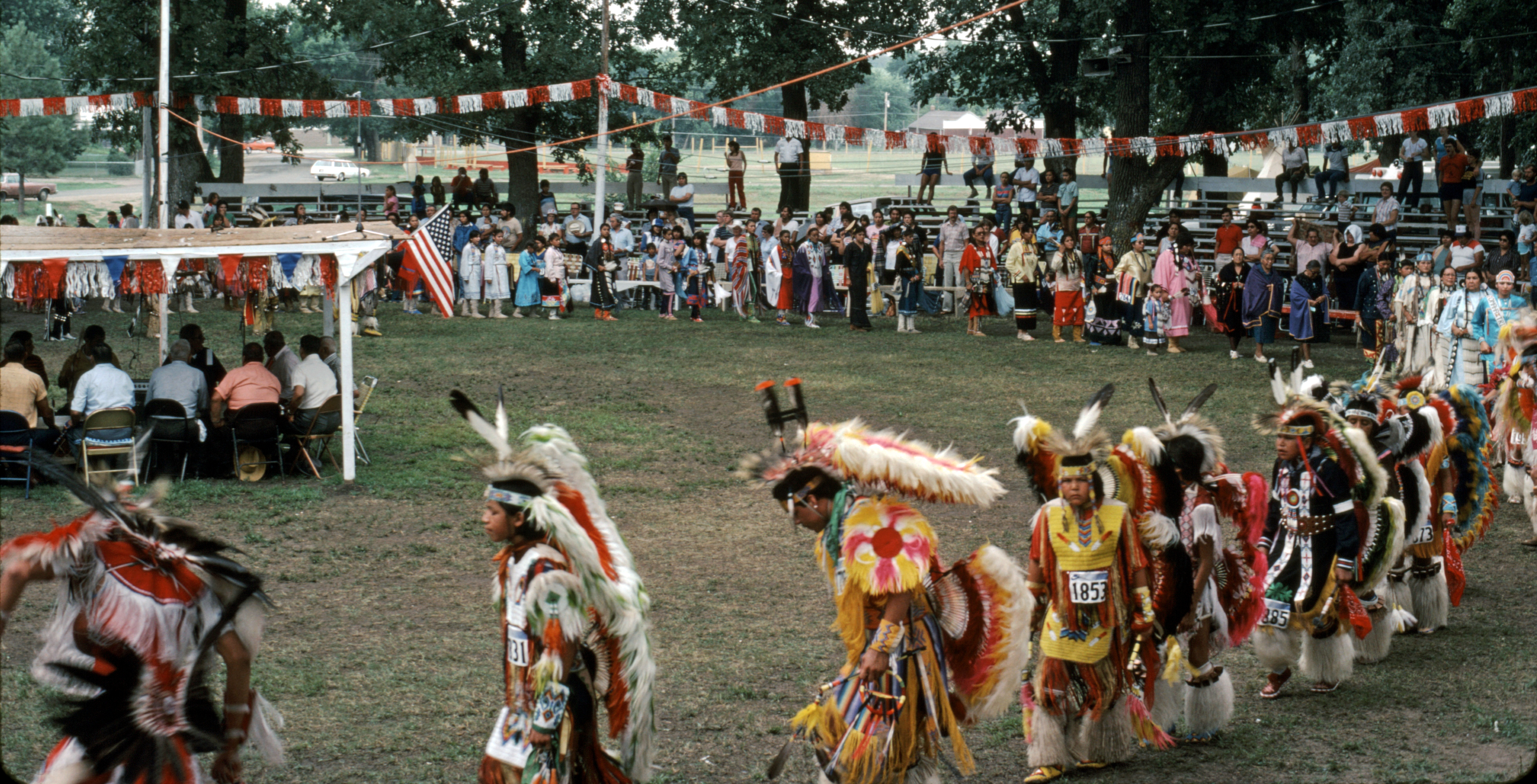
Grand Entry at the 1983 Omaha Pow-wow

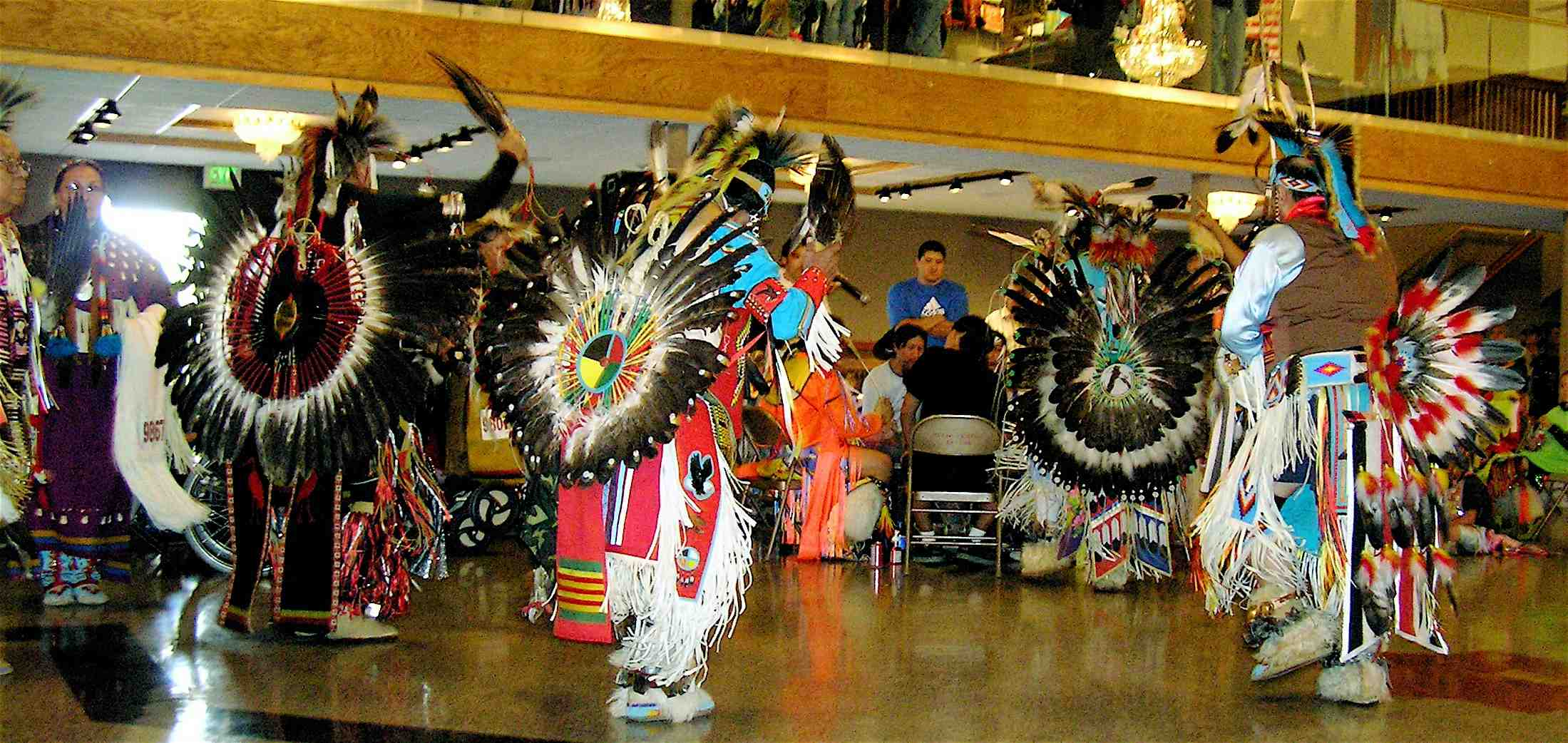
Men's traditional dancers, Montana, 2007

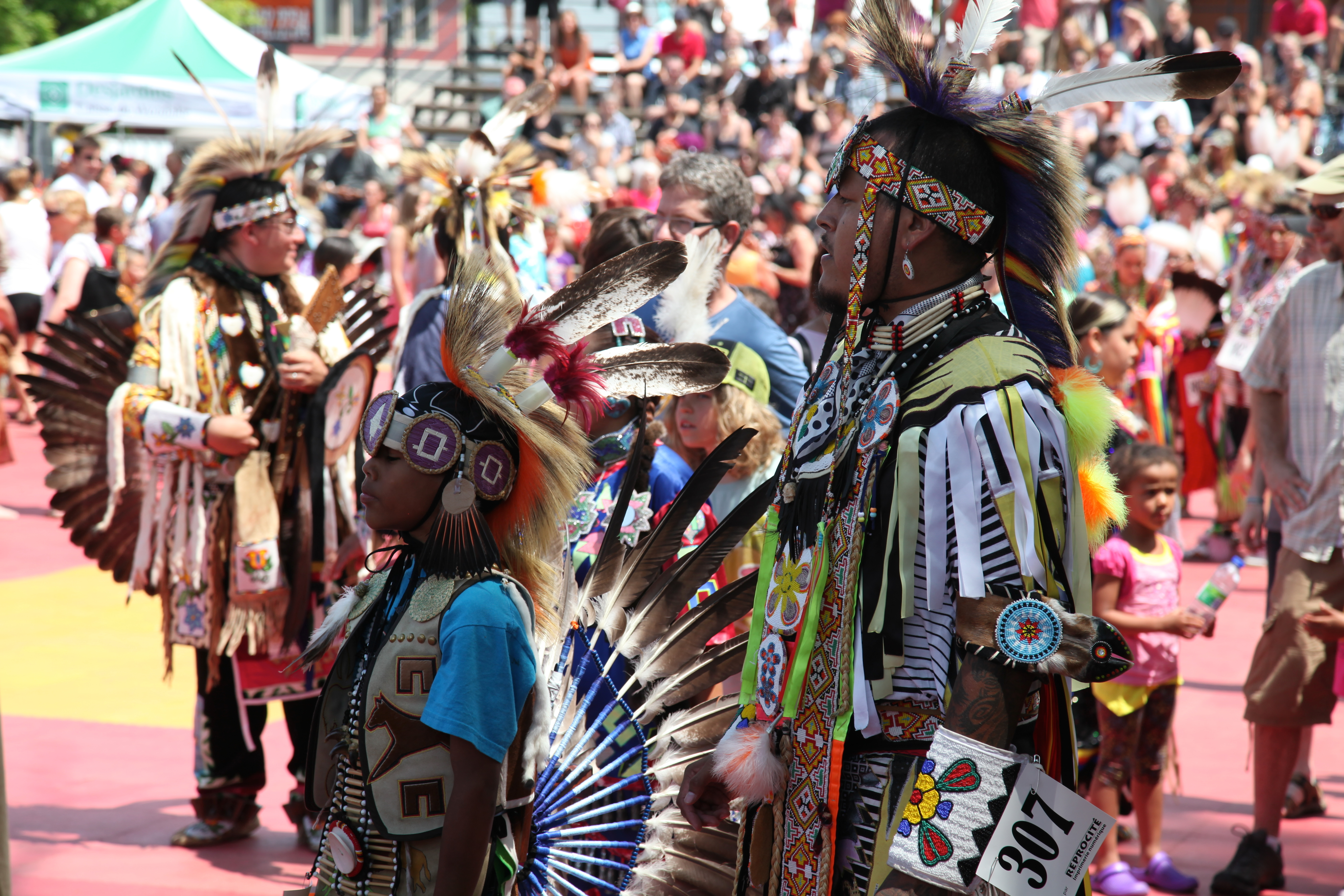
Pow-Wow in Wendake, Quebec, Canada, 2014

A powwow (also pow wow or pow-wow) is a gathering with dances held by many Native American and Canadian First Nations communities. Inaugurated in 1923, powwows today are an opportunity for Indigenous people to socialize, dance, sing, and honor their cultures. Powwows may be private or public, indoors or outdoors. Dancing events can be competitive with monetary prizes. Powwows vary in length from single-day to weeklong events.

In mainstream American culture, such as 20th-century Western movies or by military personnel, the term powwow was used to refer to any type of meeting. This usage is now considered by some Native Americans to be an offensive case of appropriation because of the cultural significance powwows hold.

== History ==
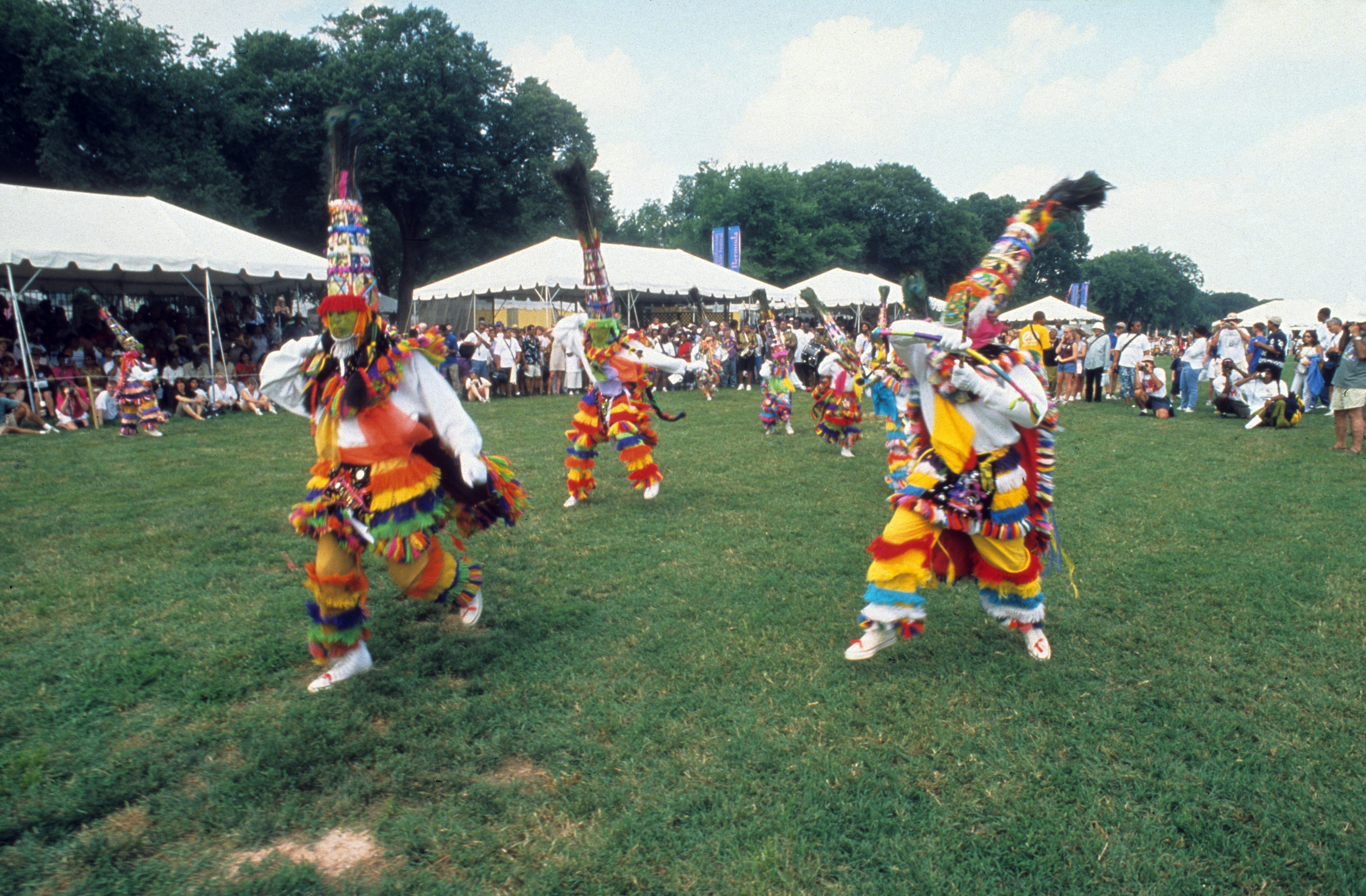
Gombey war dancers at the Smithsonian Folklife Festival in 2001

The word powwow is derived from the Narragansett word powwaw, meaning "spiritual leader". The term has variants, including Powaw, Pawaw, Powah, Pauwau and Pawau. A number of nations claim to have held the "first" pow wow. Initially, public dances that most resemble what are now known as pow wows were most common in the Great Plains region of the United States during the late nineteenth and early twentieth centuries, a time when the United States government destroyed many Native communities in the hopes of acquiring land for economic exploitation. In 1923, Charles H. Burke, Commissioner of Indian Affairs in the United States, passed legislation modeled on Circular 1665, which he published in 1921. This legislation restricted the times of the year in which Native Americans could practice traditional dance, which Burke deemed as a direct threat to the Christian religion. However, many Native communities continued to gather together in secret to practice their cultures' dance and music in defiance of this and other legislation. By the mid-twentieth century, powwows were also being held in the Great Lakes region. In the Virginia company colony of Bermuda, which has remained a British Overseas Territory since the independence of the thirteen colonies that became the United States, Pequot, Wampanoag, and Narragansett people were forcibly imported, and indigenous people from other parts of North America, as far as Mexico, also immigrated voluntarily or involuntarily during the 17th Century. Few Native American traditions survive in Bermuda, today, other than the costumes and war dance of the Gombey troupes, that also incorporate African and European elements. Gombey dancers have been invited to dance at the Mashpee Wampanoag Pow-Wow, and Wampanoags, Pequots and Cherokees have been invited to powwows in Bermuda.

== Organization ==
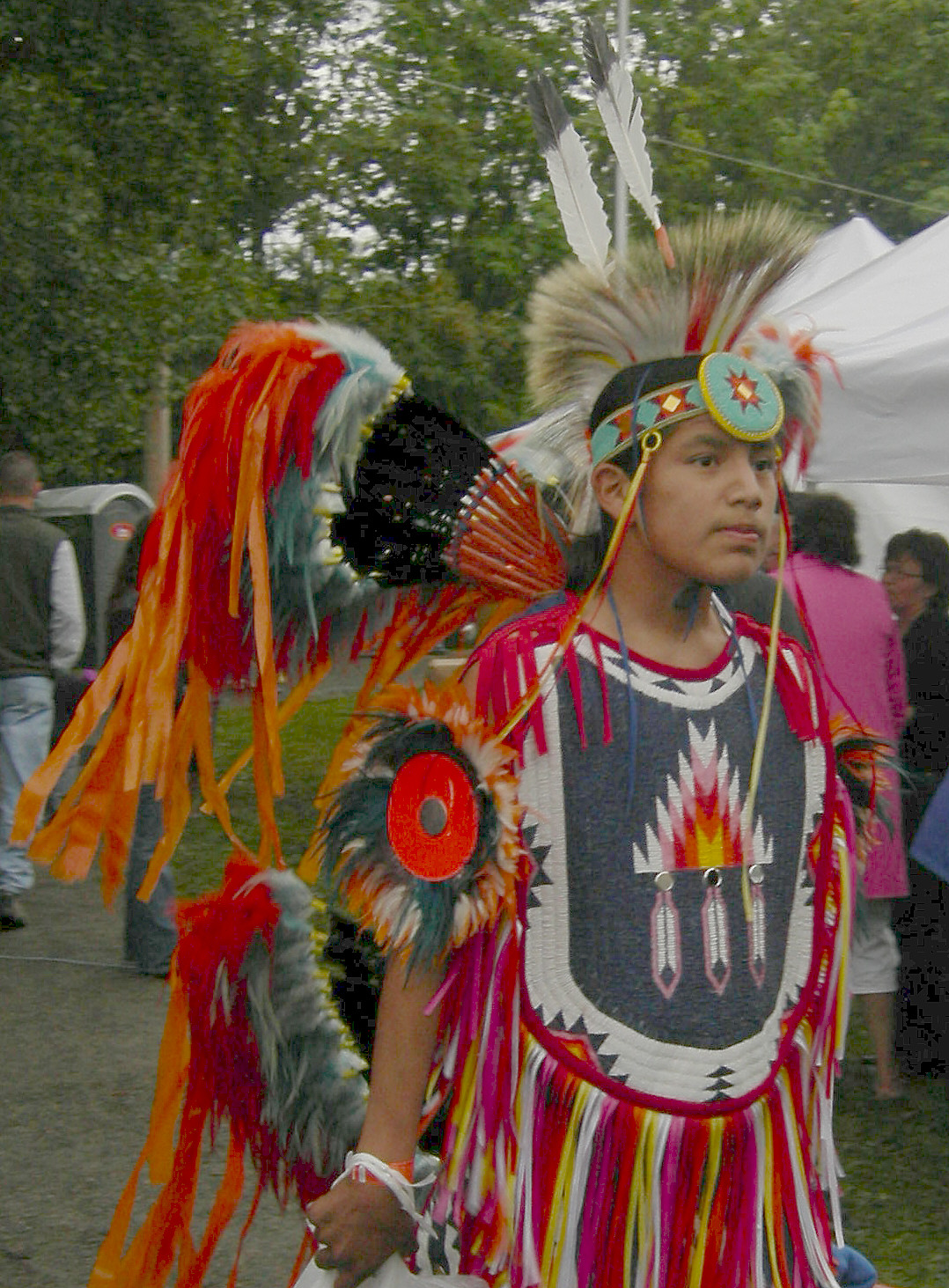
Fancy dancer, Seattle, WA 2007

Planning for a powwow generally begins months, perhaps even a year, before the event by a group of people usually referred to as a powwow committee. Pow wows may be sponsored by a tribal organization, an American Native community within an urban area, a Native American Studies program, or an American Native club on a college or university campus, a tribe, or any other organization that can provide startup funds, insurance, and volunteer workers.

=== Committee ===
A powwow committee consists of several individuals who do all the planning before the event. If a pow wow has a sponsor, such as a tribe, college, or organization, many or all members of the committee may come from that group. The committee is responsible for recruiting and hiring the head staff, publicizing the powwow, securing a location, and recruiting vendors who pay for the right to set up and sell food or merchandise at the powwow.

=== Staff ===
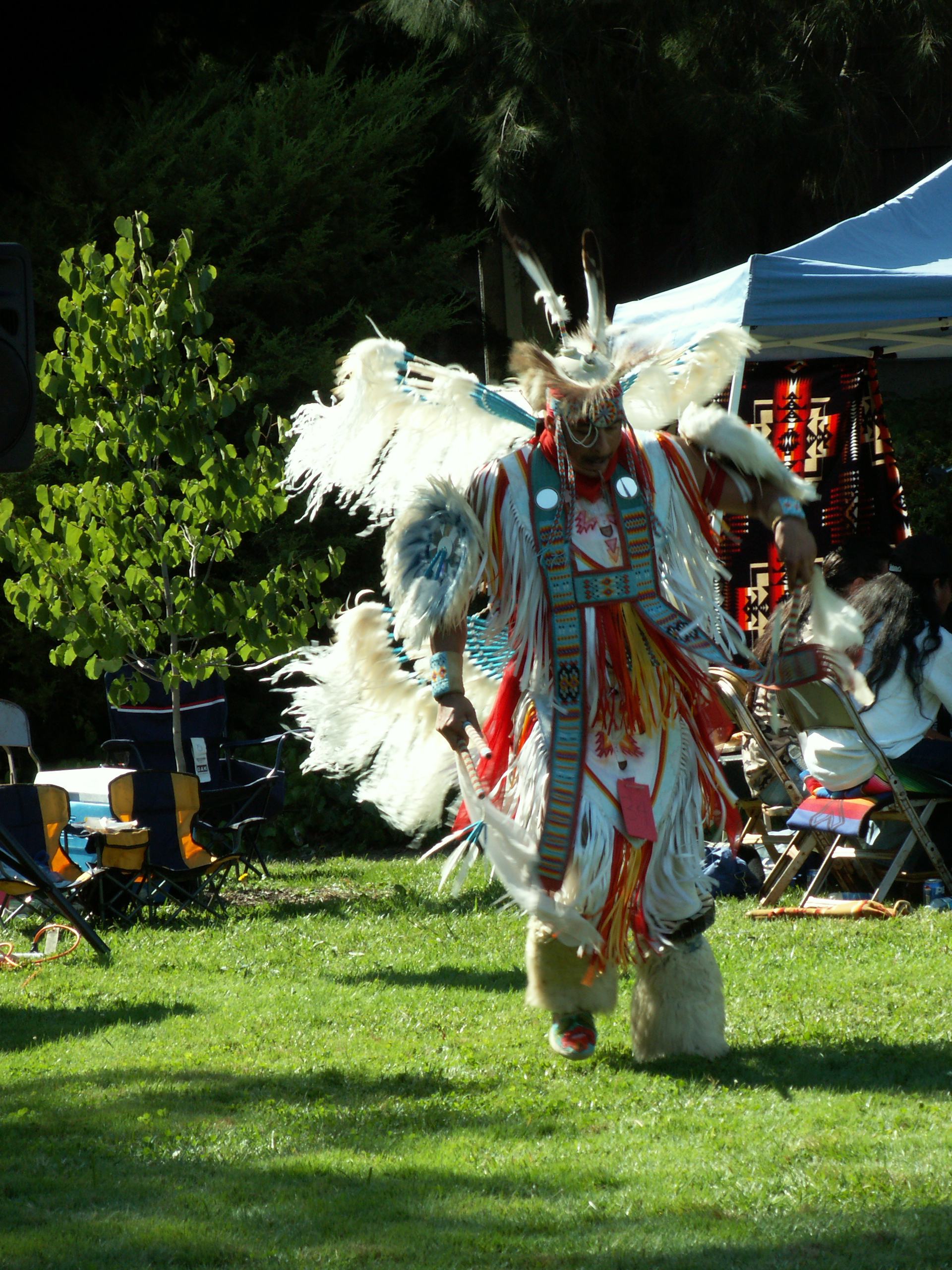
A Northern plains style Men's Fancy Dancer, California, 2005

The head staff of a pow-wow are the people who run the event on the day, or days it occurs. They are generally hired by the powwow committee several months in advance, as the quality of the head staff can affect attendance. To be chosen as part of the head staff is an honor, showing respect for the person's skills or dedication.

==== Master of ceremonies ====
The master of ceremonies, or MC, is the voice of the pow wow. It is their job to keep the singers, dancers, and public informed as to what is happening. The MC sets the schedule of events and maintains the drum rotation, or order of when each drum group gets to sing. The MC is also responsible for filling any dead air time that may occur during the pow wow, often with jokes. The MC often runs any raffles or other contests that may happen during the pow wow.

==== Head dancers ====
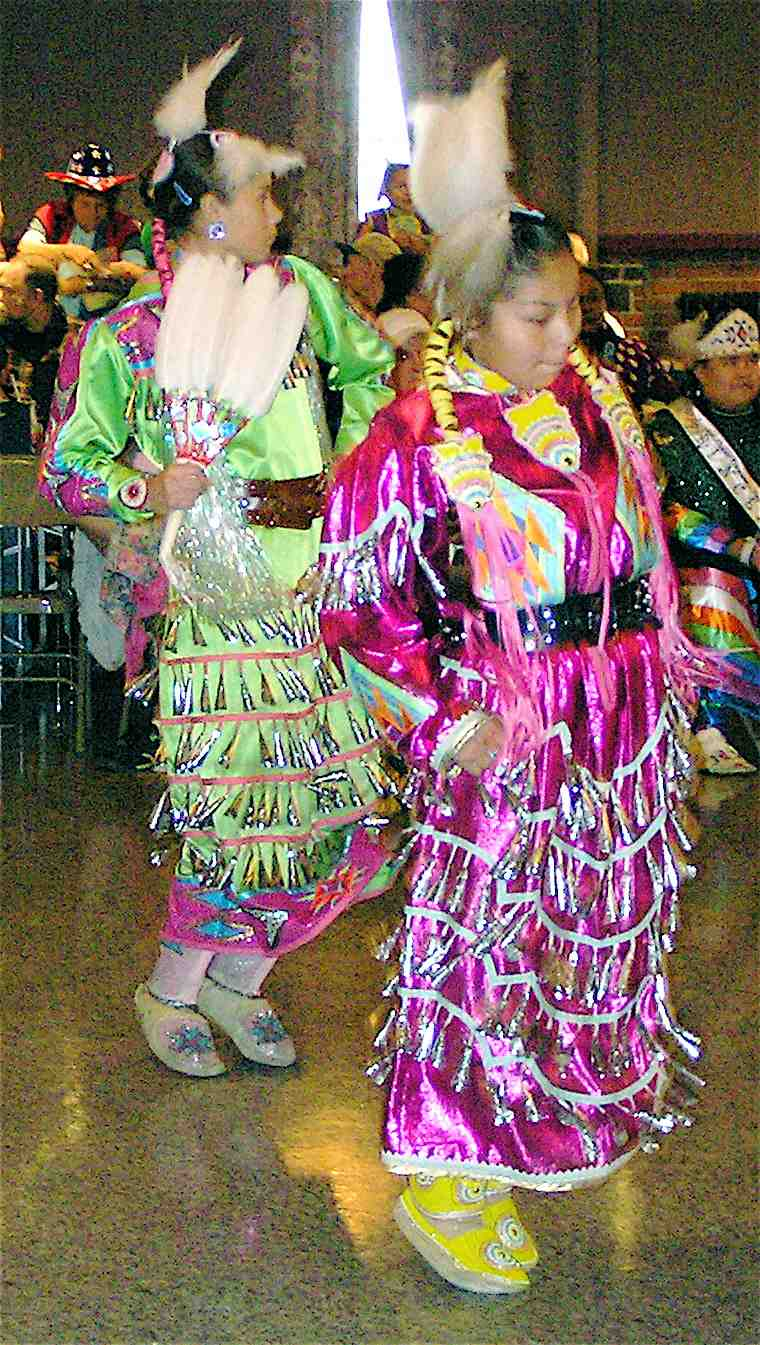
Girls in jingle dress competition

The head dancers consist of the Head Man Dancer and the Head Woman Dancer, and often Head Teen Dancers, Head Little Boy and Girl Dancers, Head Golden Age Dancers, and a Head Gourd Dancer if the pow wow has a Gourd Dance. The head dancers lead the other dancers in the grand entry or parade of dancers that opens a pow-wow. In many cases, the head dancers are also responsible for leading the dancers during songs, and often dancers will not enter the arena unless the head dancers are already out dancing.

==== Host drums and drum groups ====
The singers perform while singing. Host drummers are responsible for leading songs at the beginning and end of a pow-wow session, typically starting with a grand entry song, followed by a flag song, veterans or victory song. To conclude the pow-wow, they also perform a flag song, retreat song, and a closing song. Additionally, if a pow-wow has gourd dancing, the Southern Host Drum is often the drum that sings all the gourd songs, though another drum can perform them. The host drums are often called upon to sing special songs during the pow-wow.

Famous host drums include Black Lodge Singers, Cozad Singers, and Yellowhammer.

== The event ==
=== Setup ===
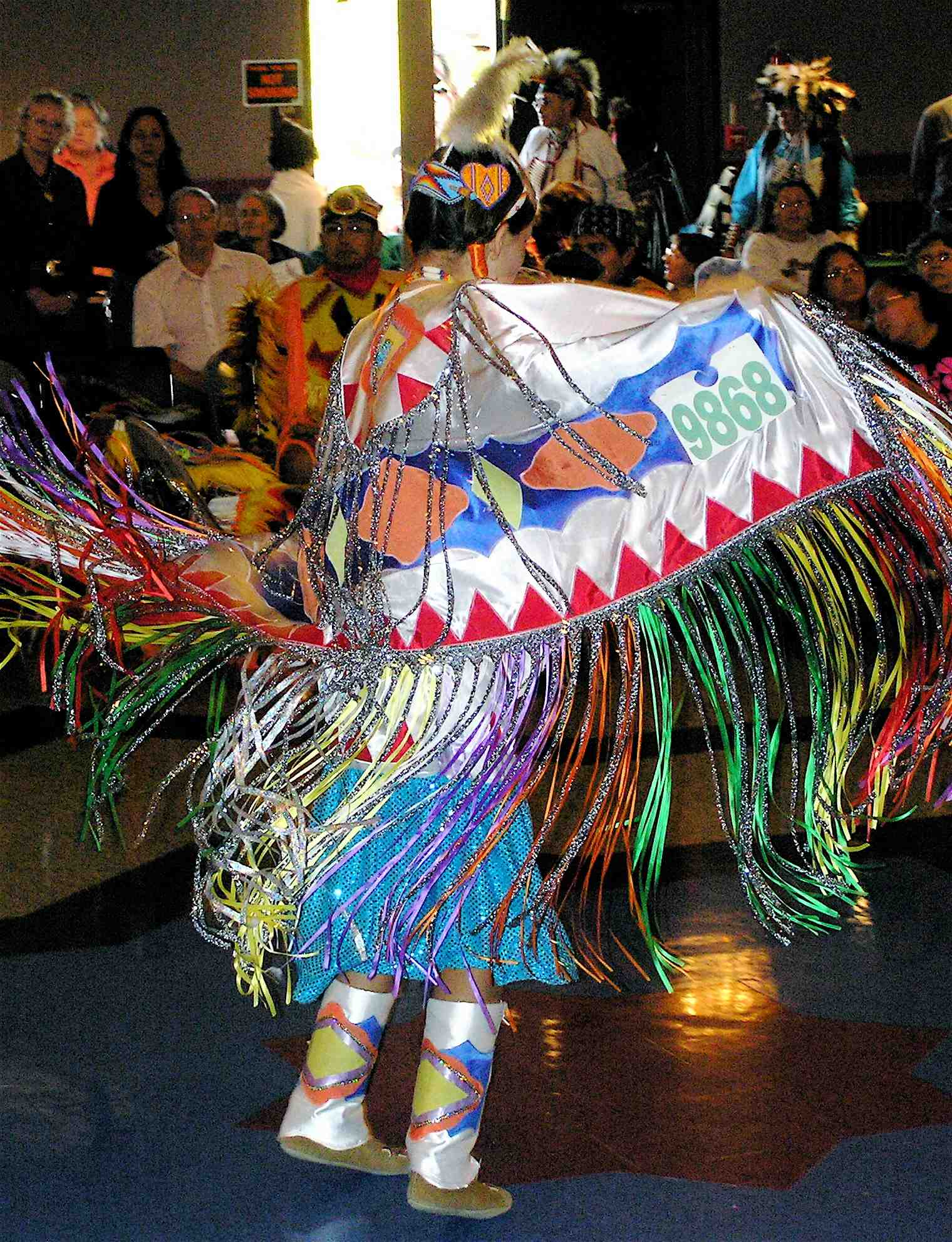
Girls' shawl dance, Montana, 2007

A pow wow is often set up as a series of large circles. The center circle is the dance arena, outside of which is a larger circle consisting of the MC's table, drum groups, and sitting areas for dancers and their families. Beyond these two circles for participants is an area for spectators, while outside of all are designated areas with vendor's booths, where one can buy food, music, jewelry, souvenirs, arts and crafts, beadwork, leather, and regalia supplies.

At outdoor pow wows, this circle is often covered by either a committee-built arbor or tent, or each group, particularly the MC and the drums, will provide their own. While most of the time, a tent provides shelter from the sun, rain can also plague outdoor events. It is particularly important to protect the drums used by the drum groups, as they are sensitive to temperature changes and, if it rains, they cannot get wet. Most vendors provide their own tents or shelters at an outdoor pow wow.

=== Etiquette ===
Pow-wow etiquette includes guidelines regarding acceptable behavior, such as rules for photography and protocol during the Grand Entry. Common practices emphasize respect for participants and traditions. The clothing worn by participants is referred to as "regalia" and should not be called a "costume". Additionally, certain rules promote courtesy, such as refraining from touching or playing the drums unless one is part of the drum group. It is also important to avoid touching individuals or their regalia without permission. Certain tribes, including the Pascua Yaqui and Hopi, prohibit photography and sketching during ceremonies.

=== Opening ===
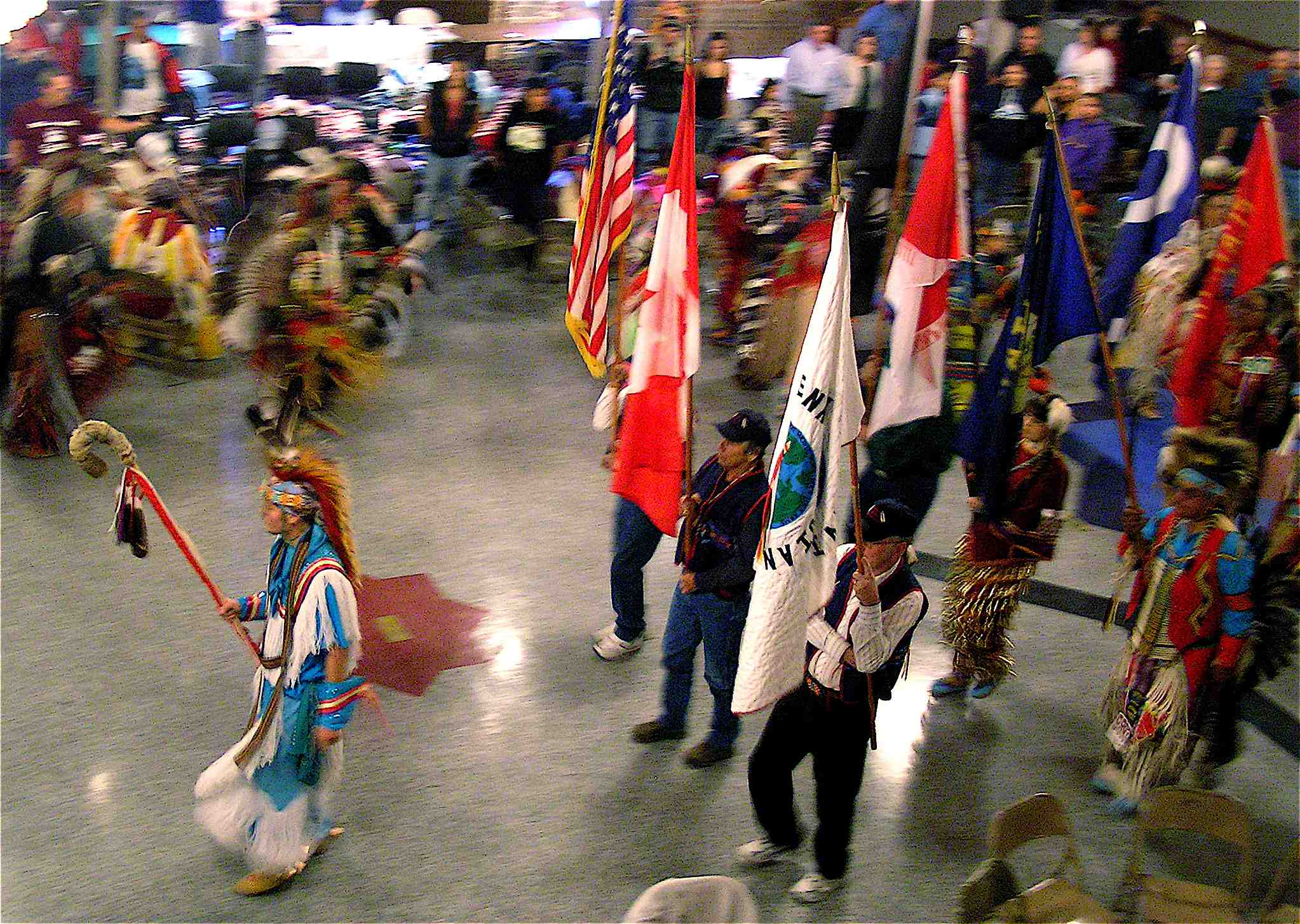
The Eagle Staff leads the Grand Entry

A pow-wow session begins with the Grand Entry and a prayer. The Eagle Staff leads the Grand Entry, followed by flags and then the dancers, while one of the host drums performs an opening song. This event is considered sacred, and some pow-wows prohibit filming or photography during this time, though others permit it.

When military veterans or active duty service members are present, they are often given the honor for carrying the flags and eagle staffs. These individuals are followed by the head dancers, after which the remaining dancers typically enter the arena in a designated order: Men's Traditional, Men's Grass Dance, Men's Fancy, Women's Traditional, Women's Jingle, and Women's Fancy. This sequence is then followed by teens and small children in the same order. After the Grand Entry, the master of ceremonies (MC) invites a respected member of the community to deliver an invocation. The host drum that did not perform the Grand Entry song will then perform a Flag Song, followed by a Victory or Veterans' Song, during which the flags and staffs are placed at the MC's table.

=== Dances ===
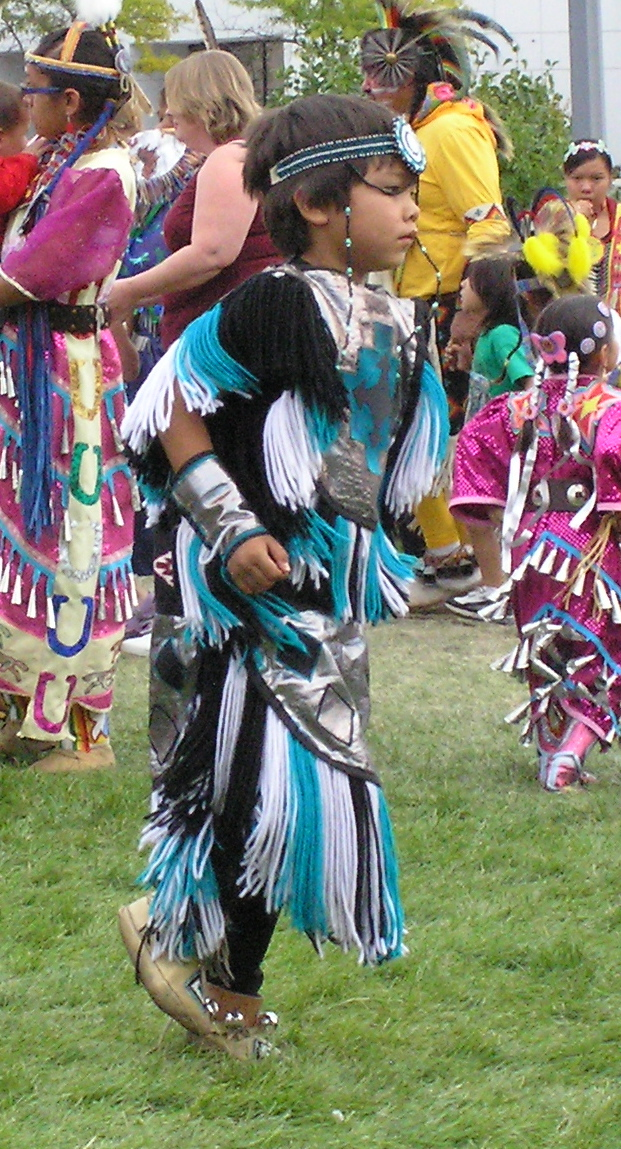
A boy in Grass Dance regalia, Spokane, WA, 2007

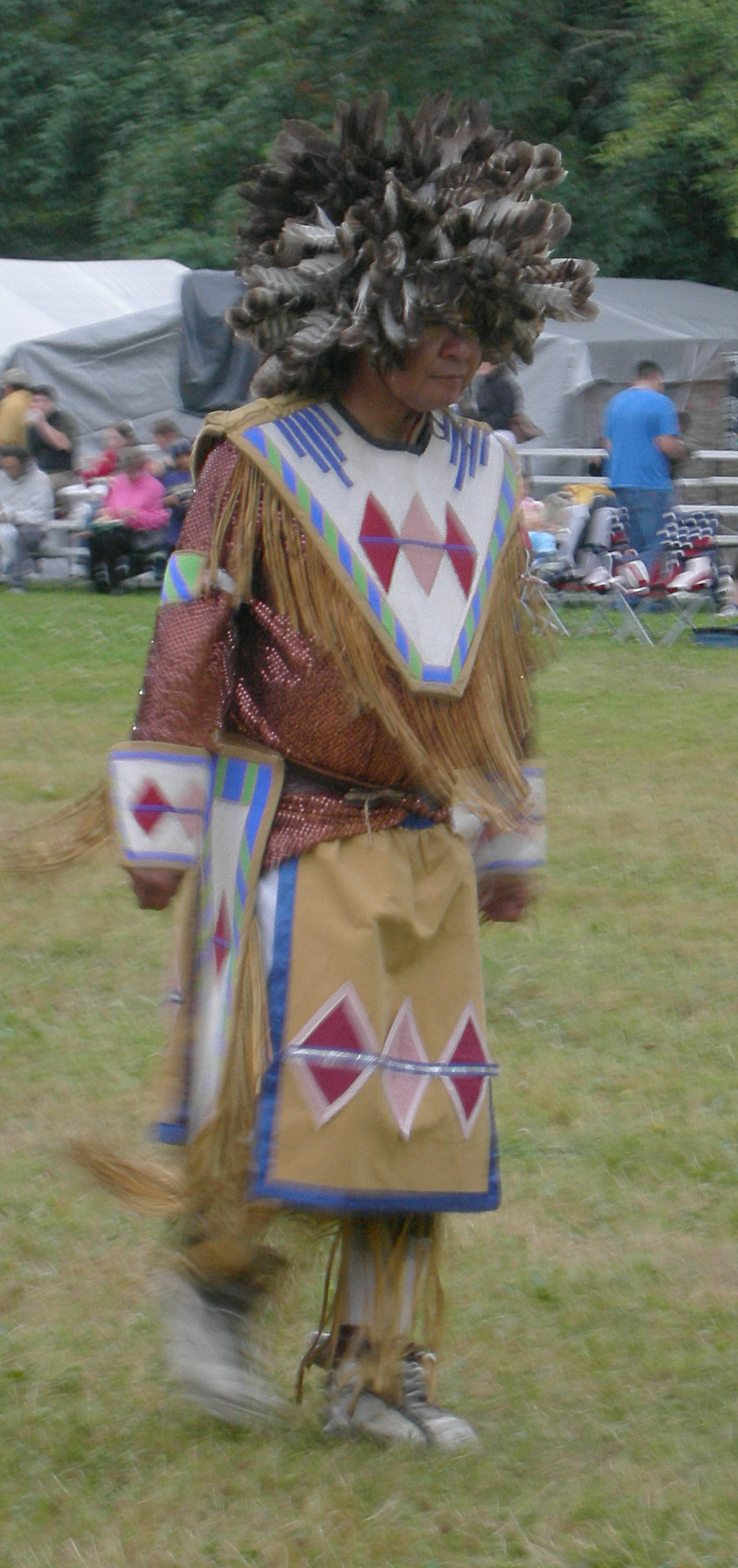
Men's Traditional regalia, Seattle, WA

The styles and types of dances at a pow wow are descended from the traditions of the Great Plains nations of Canada and the United States. Besides those for the opening and closing of a pow wow session, the most common is the intertribal, where a Drum will sing a song, and anyone who wants to can come and dance. Similar dances are the round dance; crow hop when performed by a northern drum or a horse stealing song by a southern drum; there is also "double beat", "sneakup" and, for Women's Traditional and Jingle, "sidestep". Each of these songs have a different step to be used during them, but are open for dancers of any style.

In addition to the open dances, contest dances for a particular style and age group are often held, with the top winners receiving a cash prize. To compete in a contest, the dancer must be in regalia appropriate for the competition. Larger pow wows have more specific categories. The dance categories vary somewhat by region, but general categories are as follows:

==== Men's ====
- Fancy Dance or Fancy Feather Dance (Northern and Southern styles): A dance featuring vivid regalia with dramatic movement, including spins and leaps. Fancy dancers are distinguished by their bright-colored regalia, which consists of two large bustles worn on the upper and lower back.
- Northern Traditional (simply "Men's Traditional" in the North): A dance featuring traditional regalia, including a single bustle, usually of eagle feathers, ribbon shirt, bone hair pipe choker, and breastplate. Movements are based upon a warrior scouting before a battle or other storytelling traditions tracing to when the powwow was first danced as a ceremony. The dancers carry a dance staff and a fan usually made from the wing of an eagle.
- Straight dance (or Southern traditional): Straight dancers usually are more neat and with more handmade features such as chokers, breastplates, etc. Their dances are like Northern. They take one foot and step on the ball of their foot and then they tap it once on the ground. Then they tap it once again, but this time, they put their heel a few millimeters above the ground and repeat the process with the other foot. They do this in a walking motion. It is very hard especially when following the beat of fast drums. If they catch themselves off-beat they will tap their foot three times instead of two to get back with the drums' rhythm.
- Grass Dance: A dance featuring regalia with long, flowing fringe and designs reminiscent of grass blowing in the wind. Dance movements are more elaborate than the traditional dancers, but less flashy than the fancy dancers.
- Chicken dance: a recent dance originating with the Northern Plains tribes. Dancers imitate the mating dance of the prairie chicken by rocking their heads back and forth as they spin from side to side in slow majestic movements. Regalia is less elaborate than other dances. It usually includes a porcupine hair roach and two long pheasant tail feathers that curl backward with colored plumes. Dark, snug shirts and leggings are worn, covered by a drape over the chest and back with short fringe. The bustle is small, using small pheasant or eagle feathers circling the outside of the bustle board with bunches of small loose feathers or plumes in the centre. Dancers carry a mirror board or a gourd in one hand and an eagle tail feather fan in the other.
- Eastern War Dance: A dance from the East Coast that is a storytelling dance, Men wear no bustle however do carry a fan and dance stick. This is also called the "Eastern Strait Dance".

==== Women's ====
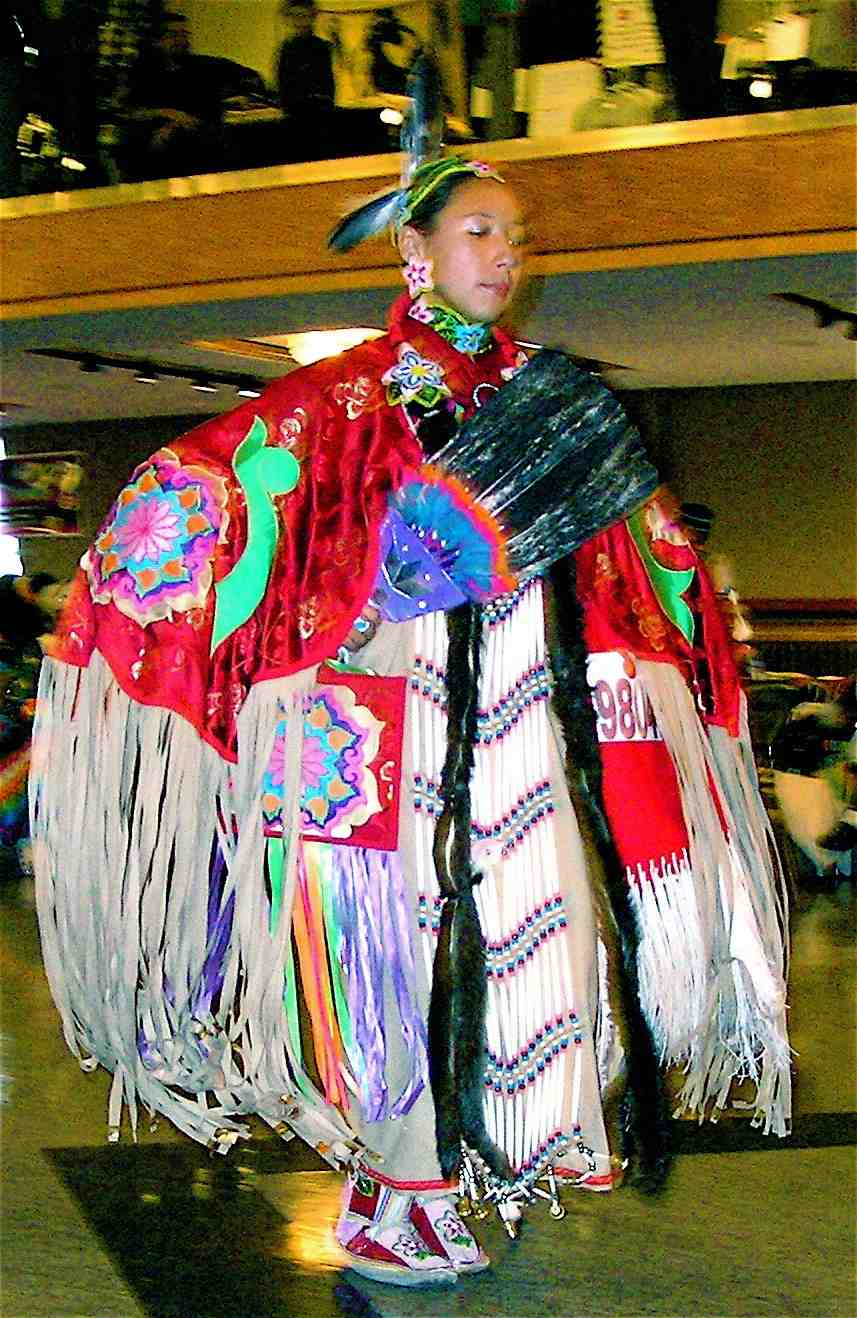
Women's traditional dancer

- Traditional (seen at Northern pow wows): A dance featuring traditional regalia of cloth or leather and dancers who perform with precise, highly controlled movement.
- Buckskin and Cloth: A traditional dance from the South. The name refers to the type of material from which the dress is made. The regalia is similar to the Northern traditional dance. However, in the South, buckskin and cloth dancers are judged in two separate categories. The dance steps are the same for both regalia categories.
- Fancy Shawl: A dance featuring women wearing brilliant colors, a long, usually fringed and decorated, shawl, performing rapid spins and elaborate dance steps.
- Jingle Dress (healing dance): The jingle dress includes a skirt with hundreds of small tin cones that make noise as the dancer moves with light footwork danced close to the ground.

Normal intertribal dancing is an individual activity, but there are also couples and group dances. Couples dances include the two step and owl dance. During a two step, each couple follows the lead of the head dancers, forming a line behind them. In contrast, in an owl dance, each couple dances alone. Group dances include the Snake and Buffalo dance, where the group dances to mimic the motions of a snake at the beginning of the dance, then changes to mimic the actions of a herd of buffalo.

At pow wows, where there is a large Southern Plains community in the area, the Gourd Dance is often included before the start of the pow wow sessions. The gourd dance originated with the Kiowa tribe and spread from there. It is a society dance for veterans and their families. Unlike other dances, the gourd dance is normally performed with the drum in the center of the dance arena, not on the side.

== Music ==
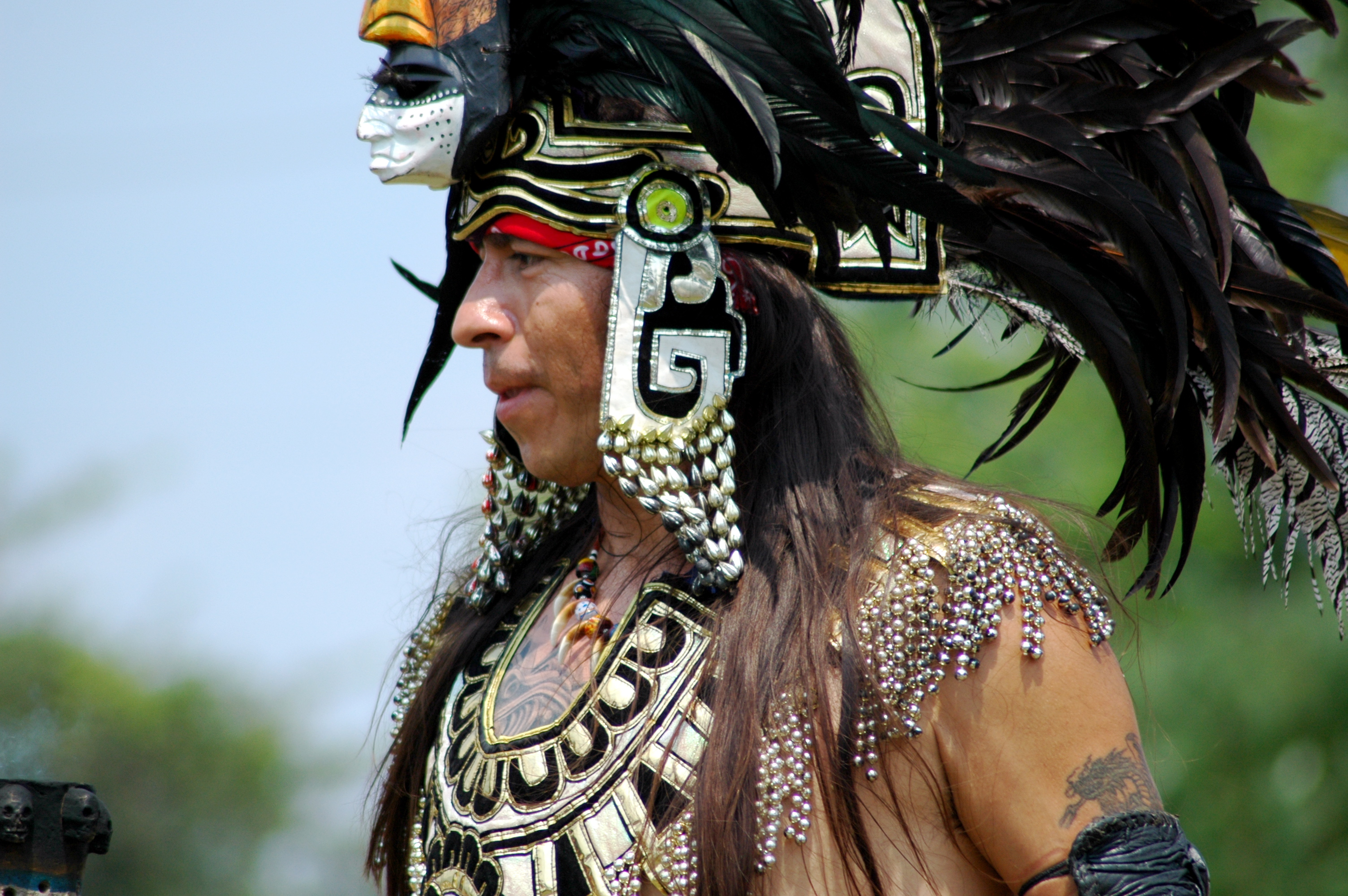
Aztec Dancer, Maryland, 2007

Though there are many genres unique to different tribes, pow wow music is characterized by pan or intertribalism with the Plains cultures, the originators of the modern pow wow, predominating. For information on dancing, see Dances.

=== Drumming ===
"Good drums get the dancers out there, good songs get them to dance well. Without drum groups, there is no music. No music, no dance, no powwow."

There may be many drums at a pow wow, especially weekend or week-long ones, but each pow wow features a host drum, which is accorded great respect. The members of drum groups are often family, extended family, or friends. Groups are then often named for families, geographic locations, tribal societies, or more colorful names. Many groups display their names on jackets, caps, vehicles, and chairs. Traditionally, only men would drum and women would sit behind the men, singing high harmonies. Beginning in the mid-1970s, women began drumming with men and seconding, or singing, an octave higher, the song. Today, there are mixed-gender and all-female drum groups.

The supplies a drum group carries include the drum, rawhide headed, a cloth bag for padded drum sticks, the drum stand, folding chairs for sitting, and, in some cases, a public address system. The drum head, stand, microphone stands, and PA box are often decorated with paintings or eagle feathers, fur, flags, and strips of colored cloth.

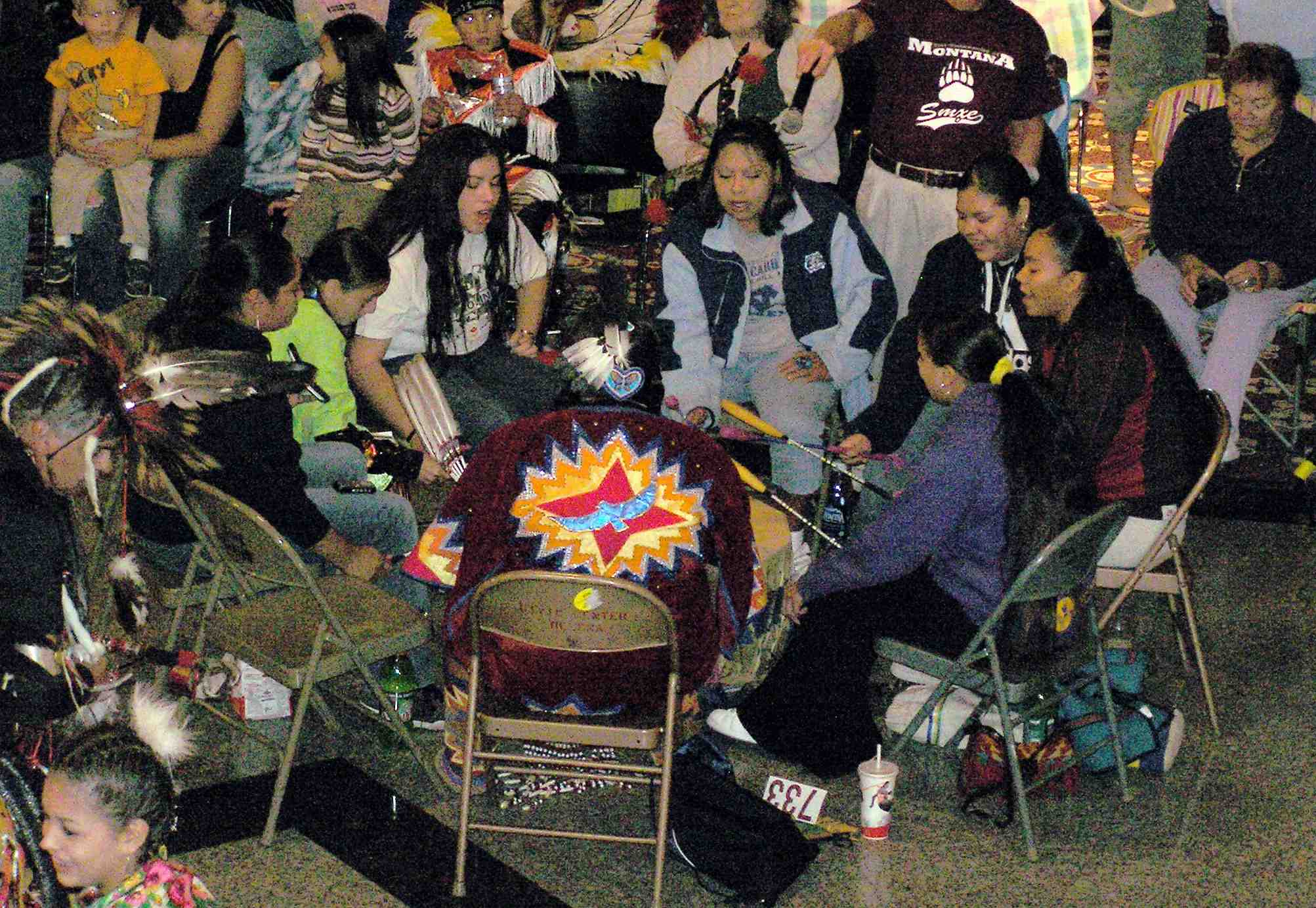
An all-woman Drum group

Readily noticeable in performances are the "hard beats" used to indicate sections of the song. The "traditional method" consists of a pronounced strike by all singers every other beat. These may appear in the first or second line of a song, the end of a section, before the repetition of a song. A cluster of three hard beats (on consecutive beats) may be used at the end of a series of hard beats, while a few beats in the first line of a song indicate performer enthusiasm. In the "Hot Five" method five beats are used, with the first hard beat four beats before the second, after which the beats alternate.

==== Etiquette ====
To understand drum protocol, a drum may be thought of as a person or being and is to be regarded and respected as such. Drum etiquette is highly important. There are regional variations. The drum is the central symbol of Oklahoma pow wows and is located in the center of the dance floor and pow wow (which are themselves shaped in concentric circles). Southern drums are suspended by four posts, one for each direction. Northern drums are set up on the outside of the dance area, with the host drum in the best position. Drummer-singers are expected to remain at their drum and ready to sing at any moment's notice; a dancer might approach the drum and whistle, fan, or gesture his staff over a drum to indicate his request for a song even if it is not that drum group's turn to sing. In some regions, it is considered disrespectful to leave a drum completely unattended. Some drum groups do not allow females to sit down at their drum but welcome them to stand behind the drummers and sing backup harmonies; the reasons for this point vaguely to a variety of tribal stories that attempt to tell the history of drumming as each group understands it. The drum is offered gifts of tobacco during giveaways and musicians acknowledge this by standing.

=== Singing ===
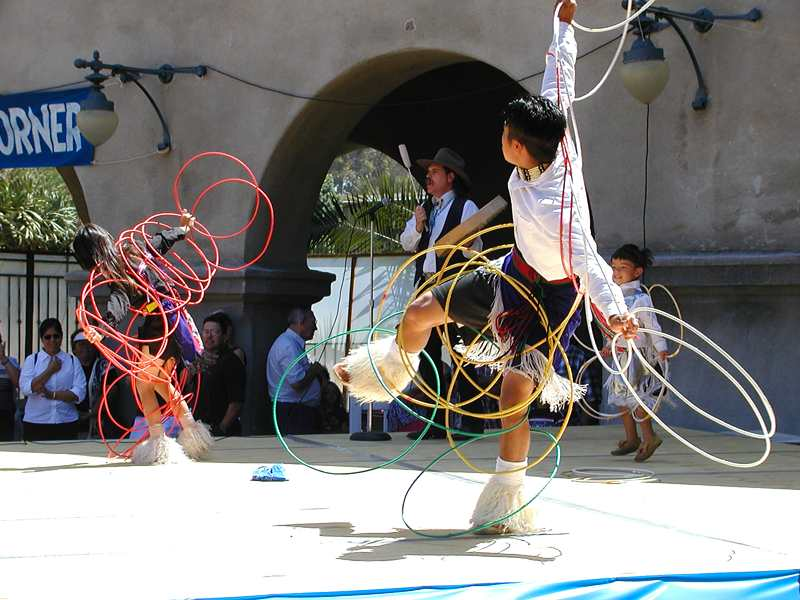
Hoop Dancers are featured at some Pow Wows. The hoop has no beginning or end; it represents the continuity of the spirits of all living things.

While the drum is central to pow wows, "the drum only helps them keep beat. Dancers key on the melody of the song. Rhythms, tones, pitch all help create their 'moves'." (p. 85) Note that Bill Runs Above did not mention the lyrics of the songs, and while they are no doubt important, most lyrics of most songs employ vocables, syllable sounds such as "ya," "hey," and "loi" (p. 86). This is particularly evident in intertribal songs, such as the AIM Song, which cannot be biased towards a certain language.

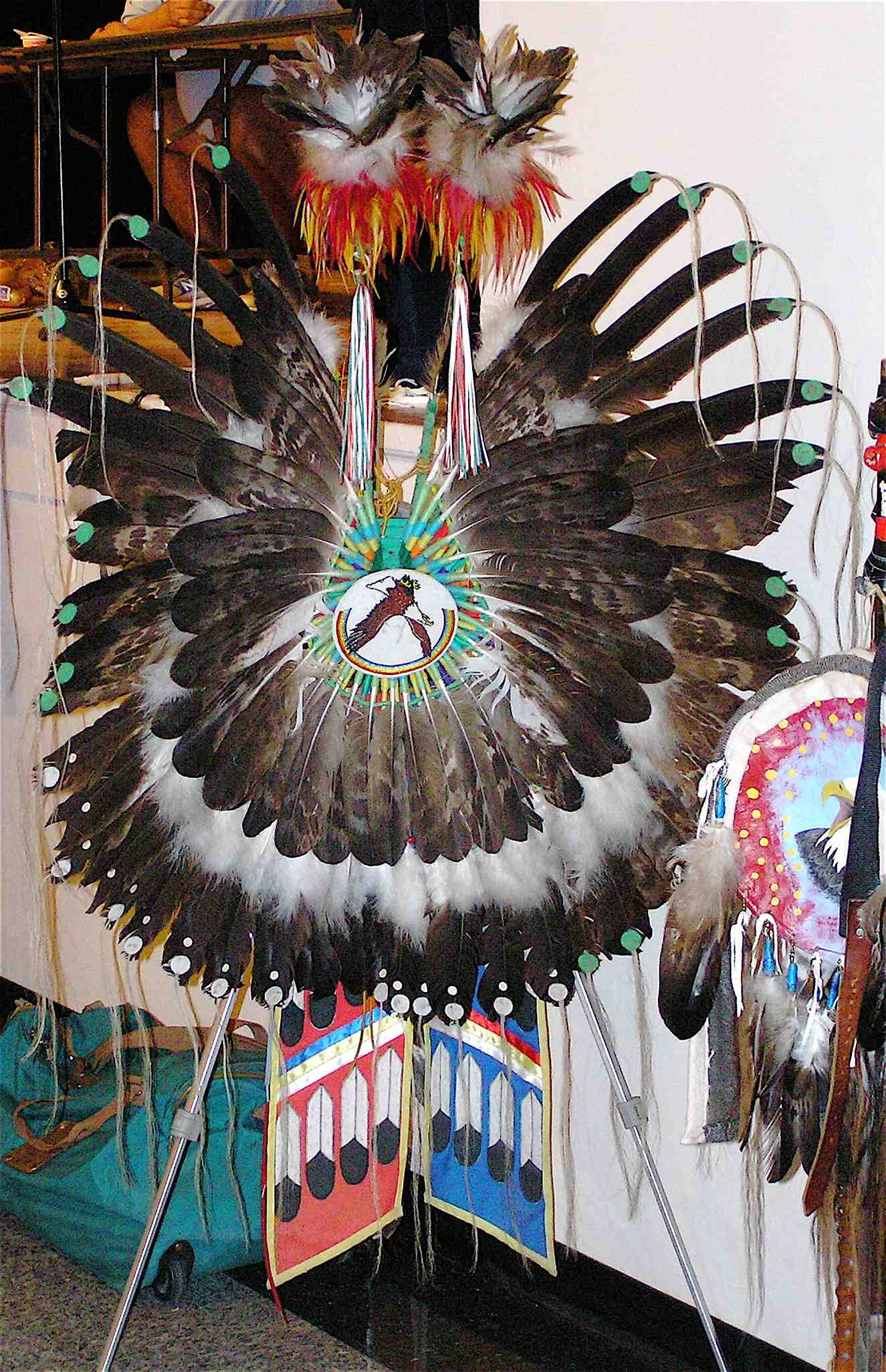
Detail of the single feather bustle of a men's traditional dance outfit

The song structure consists of four pushups, singing through the chorus and verse four times. In each chorus, the melody is introduced or led off by the lead singer, who is then seconded by another singer. The second singer begins to vary the melody before the leader's first line ends. They are then joined by the entire chorus for the rest of the pushup. Three down strokes or hard beats mark the end of the chorus and beginning of the verse, and during these dancers will alter their dancing such as by hopping low like fancy dancers. An increase in tempo and volume on the last five beats marks the end of the final verse. The dancing stops on the final beat and then a tail, or coda, finishes the song with a shortened chorus. Sometimes a drum group will sing the song more than four times, particularly when the song feels good and the singers seize the moment for an extra pushup or two (or more), or when a dancer blows a whistle or passes his staff or fan over the drum to signal that the song is to be continued four extra pushups while he prays.

Singing differs by region in that a high falsetto is used in the north, while in the south, a lower range is used. "To the unfamiliar listener, Indian singing sounds exotic, different, and difficult to comprehend," and the contrast in the quality or timbre of voice used in traditional Indian and European music may have much to do with that difficulty. However, "to the trained ear, melodies flow, ascend and descend" while dancers react to changes in the structure of the melody and the song. Boye Ladd says, "If you give me a stink song, I'll dance stink. If you give me good music, I'll give you a great show," implying that one can appreciate the music through the dancing, which is readily appreciated by everyone. But others say that today's contemporary contest dancers should dance their best no matter how well or poorly the drum group singing for their contest is. Generally, Native American singing follows a pentatonic scale, like playing only the black keys on a piano. While to the outsider, it may simply sound like drum beats accompanied by vocables, some songs include words in Cree, Pikuni, Lushuutsid, Niimipuu, Lakhota, Sahpatin, Salish, Ojibwemowin, or many other Native languages.

== See also ==
- Native American hobbyism, Germany
- Neerchokikoo
- Potlatch
- Wild Westing
- Rendezvous (fur trade)
