= Red Rock, Oklahoma =

Red Rock, Oklahoma Chína Ino Šúje
- Town
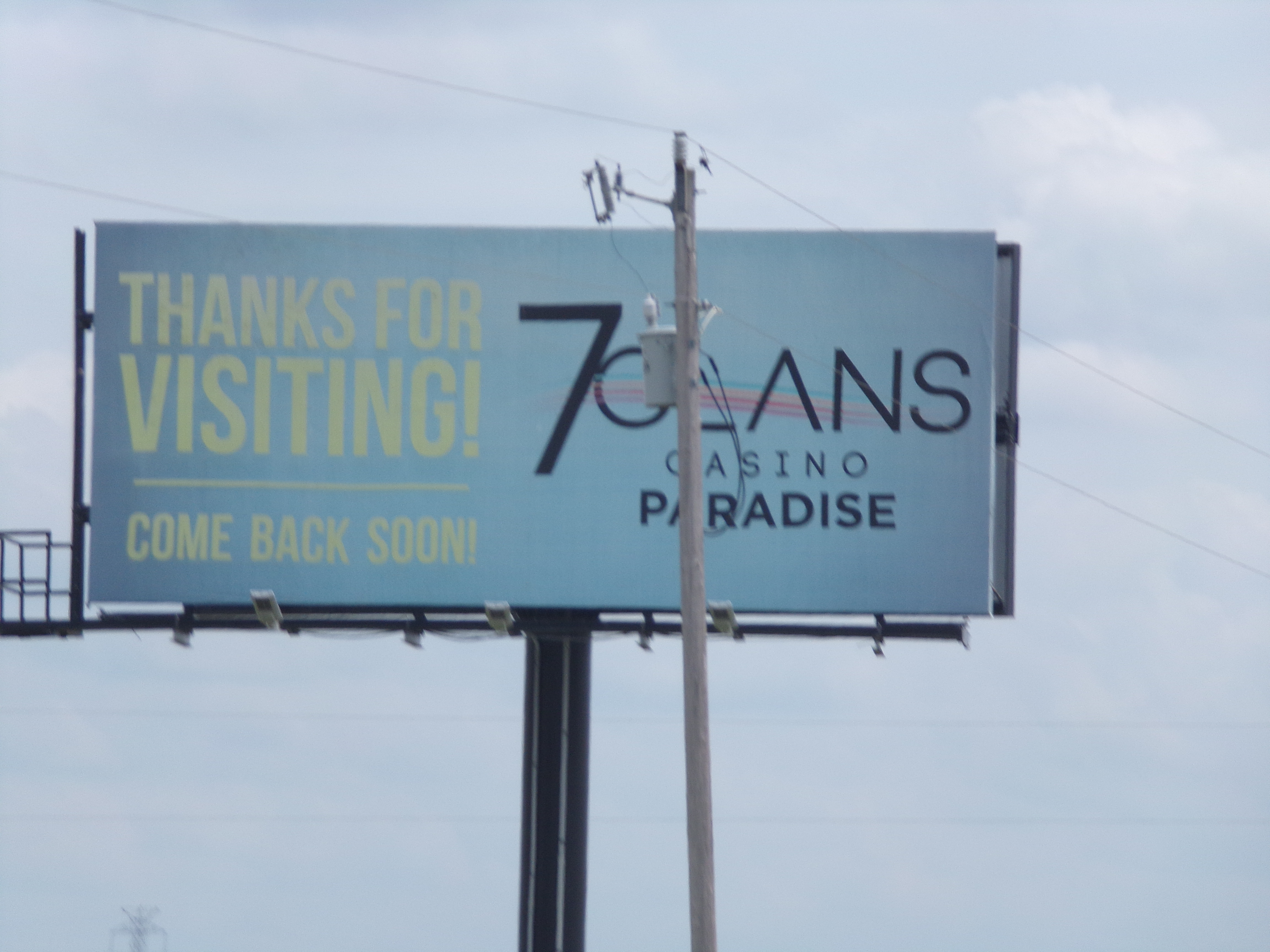
- 7 Clans Casino Sign, Red Rock, Oklahoma

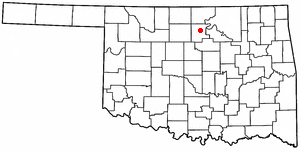
- Location of Red Rock, Oklahoma
- Coordinates: 36°27′36″N 97°10′47″W
- Country: United States
- State: Oklahoma
- County: Noble

Area
  - Total: 0.25 sq mi (0.64 km^{2})
  - Land: 0.25 sq mi (0.64 km^{2})
  - Water: 0 sq mi (0.00 km^{2})
- Elevation: 915 ft (279 m)

Population (2020)
  - Total: 245
  - Density: 987/sq mi (381.2/km^{2})
- Time zone: UTC-6 (Central (CST))
  - Summer (DST): UTC-5 (CDT)
- ZIP code: 74651
- Area code: 580
- FIPS code: 40-62650
- GNIS feature ID: 2412538

Red Rock (Iowa-Oto: Chína Ino Šúje pronounced ĩꜜno suꜜdʒɛ, meaning "Rock Red town") is a town in northern Noble County, Oklahoma, United States. As of the 2020 census, Red Rock had a population of 245. The headquarters of the Otoe-Missouria Tribe of Indians is located in Red Rock.

== History ==
In 1886, the Atchison, Topeka and Santa Fe Railroad built a line through what would become Noble County. The land around the railroad crossing of Red Rock Creek still belonged to the Otoe-Missouri reservation, but Rufus N. Dunagan operated a trading post there. A post office named "Magnolia" opened at the trading post in March 1890. The name was changed to Red Rock in June 1892. A Santa Fe train was robbed by the Dalton Gang in this locale on June 1, 1892.

On April 26, 1991, a large and extremely violent F4 tornado passed near the town. A total of six people were injured while no fatalities were reported. Minimal damage was recorded in the rural areas of Noble County during post-storm surveys. However, the tornado held the record for the highest recorded winds, as measurements of 120–125 m/s (270–280 mph; 430–450 km/h) were recorded per a University of Oklahoma mobile doppler radar unit at the time. This record was broken over eight years later on May 3, 1999, during the infamous Bridge Creek–Moore tornado which struck parts of central Oklahoma and the OKC metro.

== Geography ==
According to the United States Census Bureau, the town has a total area of 0.2 square miles (0.52 km^{2}), all land.

== Demographics ==
Historical population
Census	Pop.	Note	%±
1910	575		—
1920	329		−42.8%
1930	375		14.0%
1940	395		5.3%
1950	253		−35.9%
1960	262		3.6%
1970	233		−11.1%
1980	376		61.4%
1990	321		−14.6%
2000	293		−8.7%
2010	283		−3.4%
2020	245		−13.4%
U.S. Decennial Census

=== 2020 census ===
As of the 2020 census, Red Rock had a population of 245. The median age was 37.3 years. 35.9% of residents were under the age of 18 and 13.1% of residents were 65 years of age or older. For every 100 females there were 97.6 males, and for every 100 females age 18 and over there were 98.7 males age 18 and over.

0.0% of residents lived in urban areas, while 100.0% lived in rural areas.

There were 80 households in Red Rock, of which 50.0% had children under the age of 18 living in them. Of all households, 40.0% were married-couple households, 23.8% were households with a male householder and no spouse or partner present, and 30.0% were households with a female householder and no spouse or partner present. About 20.1% of all households were made up of individuals and 5.0% had someone living alone who was 65 years of age or older.

There were 94 housing units, of which 14.9% were vacant. The homeowner vacancy rate was 1.4% and the rental vacancy rate was 0.0%.

Racial composition as of the 2020 census
Race	Number	Percent
White	35	14.3%
Black or African American	0	0.0%
American Indian and Alaska Native	178	72.7%
Asian	0	0.0%
Native Hawaiian and Other Pacific Islander	0	0.0%
Some other race	1	0.4%
Two or more races	31	12.7%
Hispanic or Latino (of any race)	9	3.7%

=== 2000 census ===
As of the census of 2000, there were 293 people, 97 households, and 71 families residing in the town. The population density was 1,199.6 inhabitants per square mile (463.2/km^{2}). There were 107 housing units at an average density of 438.1 per square mile (169.2/km^{2}). The racial makeup of the town was 20.48% White, 73.72% Native American, and 5.80% from two or more races. Hispanic or Latino of any race were 1.02% of the population.

There were 97 households, out of which 36.1% had children under the age of 18 living with them, 49.5% were married couples living together, 17.5% had a female householder with no husband present, and 26.8% were non-families. 24.7% of all households were made up of individuals, and 14.4% had someone living alone who was 65 years of age or older. The average household size was 3.02 and the average family size was 3.68.

In the town, the population was spread out, with 32.8% under the age of 18, 10.9% from 18 to 24, 22.9% from 25 to 44, 19.5% from 45 to 64, and 14.0% who were 65 years of age or older. The median age was 31 years. For every 100 females, there were 87.8 males. For every 100 females age 18 and over, there were 87.6 males.

The median income for a household in the town was $17,031, and the median income for a family was $23,750. Males had a median income of $23,750 versus $16,875 for females. The per capita income for the town was $7,185. About 30.4% of families and 34.7% of the population were below the poverty line, including 45.3% of those under the age of eighteen and 30.6% of those 65 or over.

== Education ==
In 1989, the Red Rock School District consolidated with the Marland district. The consolidated district was renamed Frontier School District.

=== Sports ===
The Frontier Mustangs have made it to the state basketball tournament 14 consecutive times and have won six state championships in the 20 years of the school's existence.

== Notable people ==
- Benjamin Arkeketa (1928-2002), Navajo painter
- Sanora Babb (1907-2005), American novelist, poet, and literary editor.
- Della Warrior (born 1946), raised in Red Rock, female chair of the Otoe-Missouria Tribe.
