= Reflexivity (grammar) =

Property of syntactic constructs

In grammar, reflexivity is a property of syntactic constructs whereby two arguments (actual or implicit) of an action or relation expressed by a single predicate have the same reference.

Reflexivity may be expressed by means of reflexive pronouns or reflexive verbs. The latter ones may be constructed with the help of reflexive affixes (e.g., in Russian) or reflective particles (e.g., in Polish).
