= Chono =

Chono may refer to:

== Peoples and languages ==
- Chono people, a historic indigenous group of Chile
- Chono language, an extinct language of Chile

== People with the name ==
- Chono Penchev (born 1994), Bulgarian volleyball player
- Chono Ca Pe, Native American chief of the Otoe tribe
- Ubaid Chono Kadavath (born 1990), Indian professional footballer
- Hisayoshi Chōno (長野 久義; born 1984), Japanese baseball player
- Jirō Chōno (蝶野 仁郎; 1907–1941), Japanese fighter pilot
- Masahiro Chono (蝶野 正洋; born 1963), Japanese-American professional wrestler and actor

== See also ==
- Chonos (disambiguation)
