= Charles Bird King =

American painter (1785–1862)

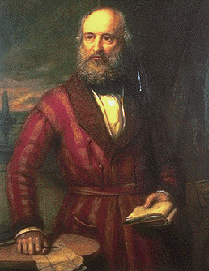
- Self-portrait, 1854-55
- Born: September 26, 1785; Newport, Aquidneck Island, Newport County, Rhode Island
- Died: March 18, 1862 (aged 76); Washington D.C.
- Education: Edward Savage in New York, and Benjamin West at the Royal Academy in London
- Known for: Painting, including portraiture, still life, and genre
- Notable work: Native American portraiture commissioned by the United States Government from 1822 to 1842
- Patrons: John Quincy Adams, John Calhoun, Henry Clay, James Monroe, Daniel Webster and William Henry Tayloe

Charles Bird King (September 26, 1785 – March 18, 1862) was an American portrait artist, best known for his portrayals of significant Native American leaders and tribesmen. His style incorporated Dutch influences, which can be seen most prominently in his still-life and portrait paintings. Although King's artwork was appreciated by many, it has also been criticized for its inaccurate depictions of Native American culture.

== Biography ==
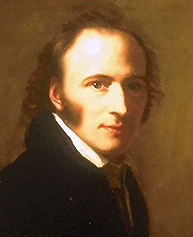
Detail of a self-portrait aged 30, 1815

Charles Bird King was born in Newport, Rhode Island, the only child of Deborah (née Bird) and Zebulon King, an American Revolutionary veteran and captain. The family traveled west after the war, but when King was four years old, his father was killed and scalped by Native Americans near Marietta, Ohio. Because of this, Deborah King took her young son and moved back to her parents' home in Newport.

When King was fifteen, he went to New York to study under the portrait painter Edward Savage. At age twenty he moved to London to study under Benjamin West at the Royal Academy. After a seven-year stay in London, King returned to the U.S. due to the War of 1812. He lived and worked in the major cities of Philadelphia, Pennsylvania; Baltimore, Maryland; and Richmond, Virginia.

He eventually settled in Washington, DC, due to the economic appeal of the burgeoning capital city. Here King developed a solid reputation as a portraitist among politicians, and earned enough to maintain his own studio and gallery. King's economic success in the art world, particularly in the field of portraiture, was in part dependent on his ability to socialize with the wealthy celebrities, and relate to the well-educated politicians of the time: "His industry and simple habits enabled him to acquire a handsome competence, and his amiable and exemplary character won him many friends". These patrons included such prominent leaders as John Quincy Adams and John C. Calhoun. King's popularity and steady stream of work left him with little reason or need to leave Washington. In 1827 he was elected to the National Academy of Design as an Honorary Academician.

King never married. He lived in Washington until his death on March 18, 1862. He bequeathed his collection of paintings, books, and prints to the Redwood Library and Athenaeum.

== Styles and influences ==
Though King's legacy lies in his portraiture, throughout his career he also demonstrated a great technical skill in still life, genre, and literary paintings. Scholars have thought he would have preferred to focus on these styles throughout his career, but he needed to earn a living. Painting portraits was the only way for artists to make enough money to live on in the early part of the 19th century.

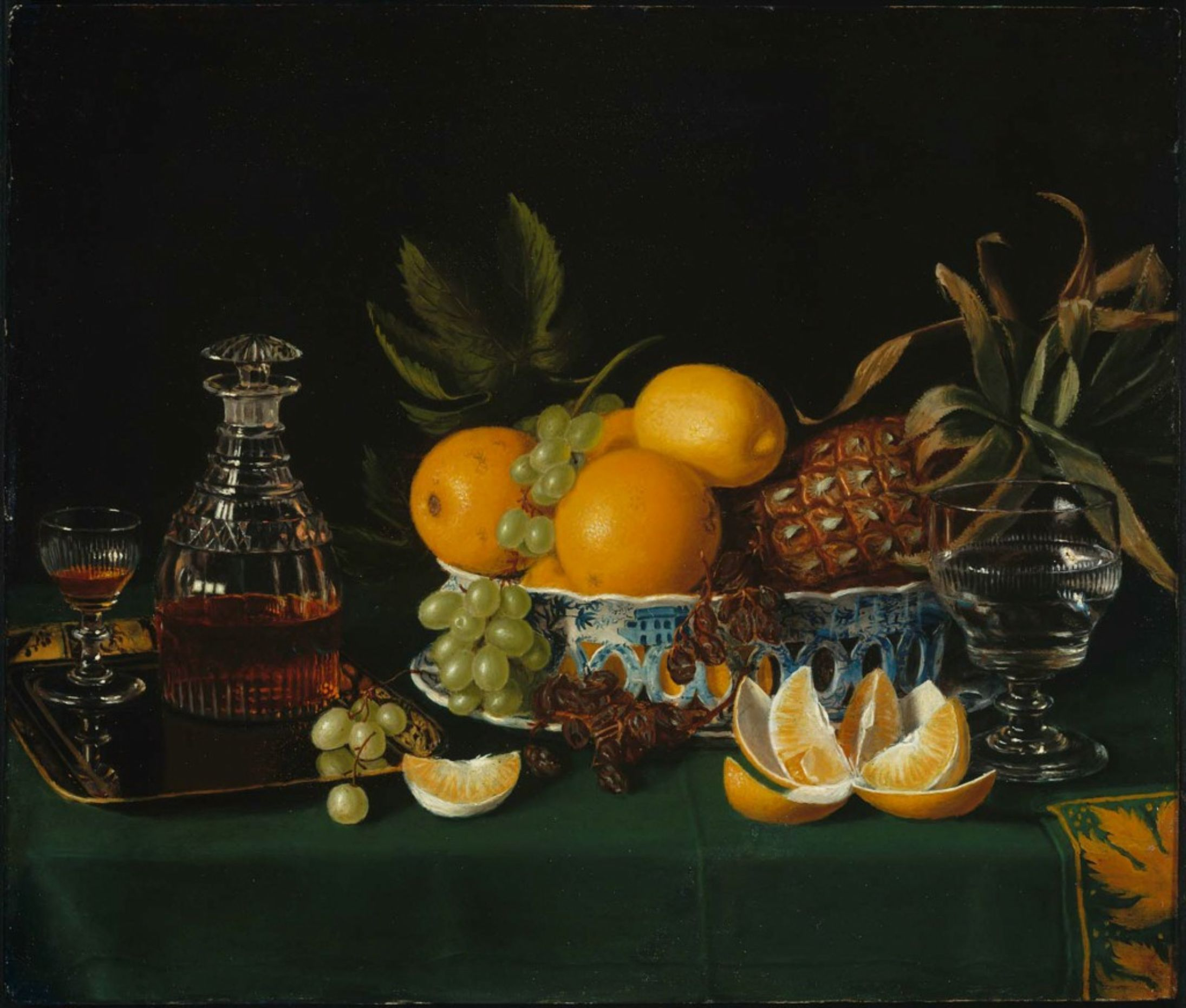
Still Life on a Green Table Cloth, c. 1815

King's inclination towards genre and still life paintings is thought to have been influenced to his seven-year stay in London. The 16th and 17th-century style attributed to masters in Northern Europe, especially that of the Dutch and Flemish, was quite popular in the upper echelons of the art culture. While attending the Royal Academy, King was swayed towards the Dutch styles by the demand such works commanded. He also was able to study the works and learn from them. It is likely that through his schooling, he was able to study the British royal collection, as "Prince of Wales, and Regent, George IV collected Dutch art voraciously…" and the prints were the favored style at the time by other members of European royalty.

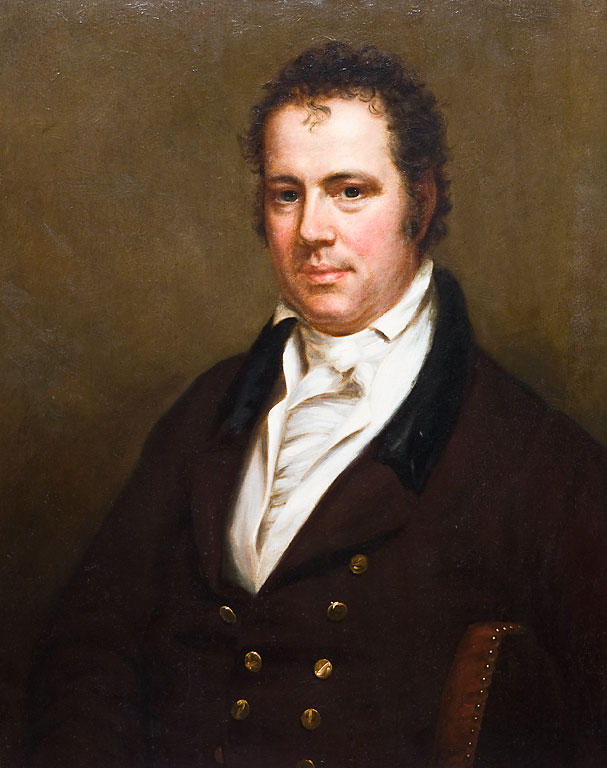
Portrait of Senator William Hunter of Rhode Island, 1824

King took more than stylistic cues from these examples, as he also employed some of the techniques which he saw. As Nicholas Clark wrote in 1982, King "sometimes relied upon Dutch prints for formal solutions." The prints were sources of valued composition. Many of King's paintings include features that show the influence of Dutch art. As noted above, King incorporated the techniques of Dutch painting into his portraits, though he recognized that the United States was not yet as familiar with "references to the style as it would be in the sphere of "post-Civil War materialism…". King was especially influenced by the Dutch tradition of trompe l'oeil, a technique that resulted in illusions capable of deceiving the viewer. King especially used this technique in his still-life paintings.

King is known to have been especially committed to staying within the confines of the traditional style of painting which he learned in his youth: "it is apparent that the artist would adapt, time and again, traditional European mannerisms to his new and native subject matter".

While King completed a number of paintings that invoked Dutch painting technique, he is better known as an important figure for his numerous portraits of Native Americans, commissioned by the federal government. He was also commissioned by the government for portraits of celebrated war heroes, and privately by the political elite. Painting was used to portray important men before the time of photography. Despite his popularity at the time, King is often overlooked in the broad scope of art history. His relative obscurity may be due in part to his lack of innovation in his work. It is also surely due to the loss of most of his numerous Indian portraits to a fire in the Smithsonian. With his most unique work destroyed, he was overlooked by succeeding generations.

== Dedication to Native Americans ==
The Smithsonian art historian Herman J. Viola notes in the preface to The Indian Legacy of Charles Bird King that he compiled the book in order to acknowledge the importance of King, as well as his Native American subjects, as part of the creation of a federal collection of Indian portraits. The government, private collectors, and museums hold portraits by a number of talented United States' painters, including George Catlin, James Otto Lewis, and George Cooke. King's work makes up a bulk of the Indian portrait collection, with more than 143 paintings done from 1822 to 1842.

Thomas McKenney, who served as the United States superintendent of Indian trade in Georgetown and later as the head of the Bureau of Indian Affairs, initiated the government's commissioning of the portraits. Like many others, at the time he believed that the indigenous people were nearing extinction, and he was seeking ways to preserve their history and culture. Some scholars have described this view of Native American culture as a product of "imperialist nostalgia," which the art historian Frances K. Pohl, building on the work of the cultural anthropologist Renato Rosaldo, defines as "a yearning for that which one has indirectly or directly participated in destroying." McKenney sought to preserve Native American culture while carrying out governmental policies that were responsible for its erasure. He first tried to collect artifacts from various tribes, then thought of having portraits painted for the government. About this time, he met King, whose talent he appreciated. "The arrival of Charles Bird King on the Washington scene inspired the imaginative McKenney to add portraits to his archives." King painted the subjects in his own studio, as McKenney easily obtained the consent for the portraits from Native American leaders coming to Washington to do business with the US through his new department. King's 20-year role in painting works for the collection was profitable for the artist. He charged at least $20 for a bust, and $27 for a full-figure portrait, allowing him to collect an estimated $3,500 from the government.

The portraits gained widespread publicity beyond Washington during this period as McKenney broadened his project by publishing a book on Native Americans. In 1829 he began what would become many years' worth of work on the three-volume work, History of the Indian Tribes of North America. The project featured the many portraits of Native Americans, mostly King's, in lithograph form, accompanied by an essay by the author James Hall.

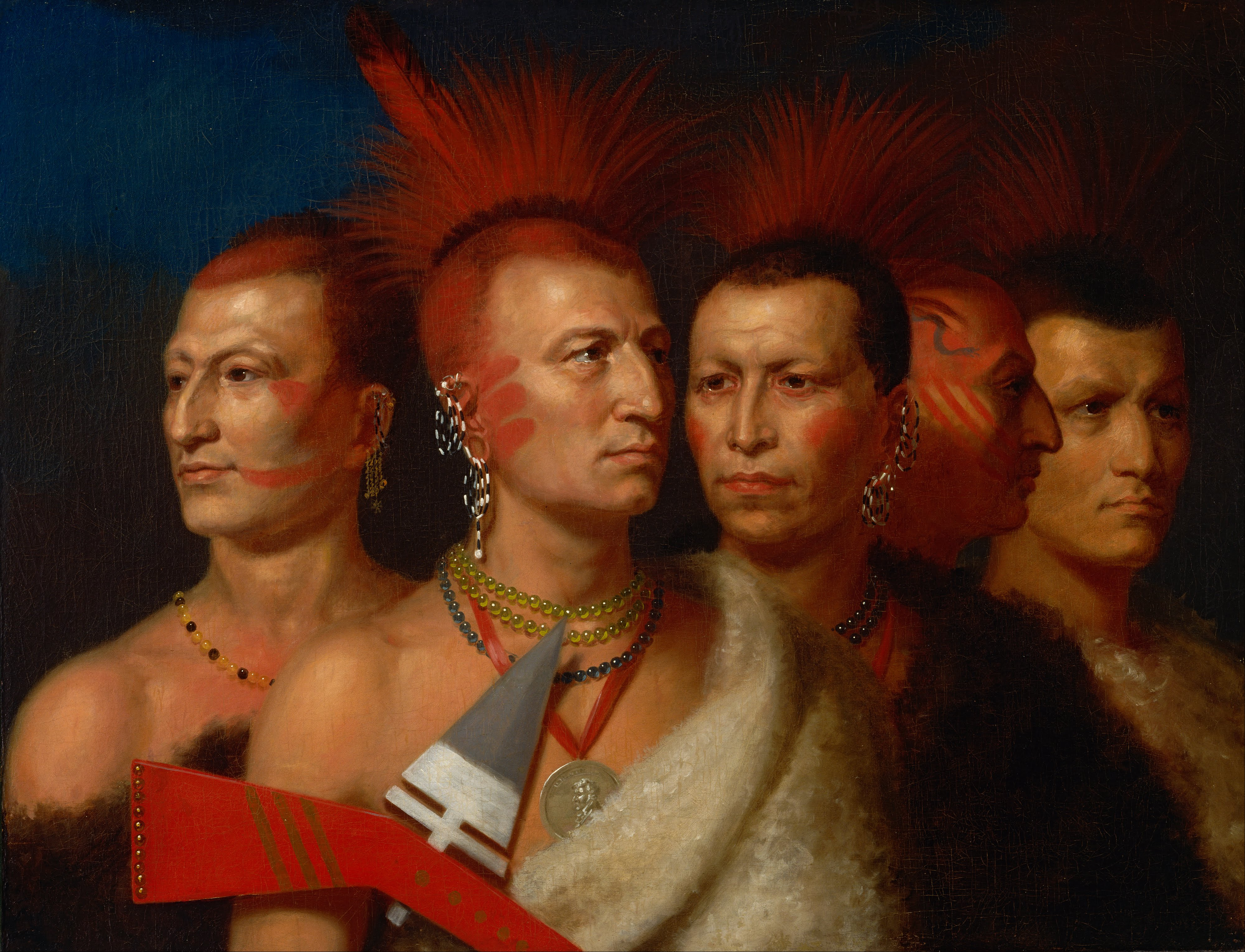
Charles Bird King, Young Omahaw, War Eagle, Little Missouri, and Pawnees, 1821, now in the Smithsonian Institution.

One of King's most renowned pieces in the project, Young Omahaw, War Eagle, Little Missouri, and Pawnees, focused on different Native American subjects. The artwork has been described as a "profound study of Indian character," a magnificent image of a "newly discovered and exotic race," and is composed of a "felicitous amalgam of the real and the ideal." Some art historians, however, have taken a more critical approach to King's representation of Native Americans in this work. The portrayal of the Native American men in the painting is, according to this more critical view, merely a stereotypical conglomerate of different Native American tribes. King has seemingly "sacrificed their individuality, creating a facial composite that he hoped would draw a sympathetic response from a white audience." King, these scholars suggest, structured his piece around the interests of his audience rather than portraying a true account of Native American tribes.

Although King tailored his piece to his audience, he has been praised for being the first white artist to "paint an Indian wearing a flowing-feather bonnet of eagle feathers" and "Plains Indian women."

After the administration changed and McKenney left the BIA, the agency donated the Native American portrait collection to the National Institute, but shoddy care and shoddy displays kept it from the public eye. When the National Institute deteriorated, it gave its work in 1858 to the Smithsonian Institution. King's portraits were displayed among similar paintings by the New York artist John Mix Stanley, in a gallery containing a total of 291 paintings of Native American portraits and scenes. On January 24, 1865, a fire destroyed the paintings in this gallery, though a few of King's were saved before the flames spread. Representations of many of the lost paintings have been found in McKenney's lithograph collection that supported the book.

== Criticisms ==
Although King's work was widely appreciated, his portrayals of Native American subjects and still life paintings also received criticism. An artist colleague of King's, Charles Robert Leslie, argued that while King's "greatest excellence was in his coloring of flesh" and his ability to be accurate in drawing "heads", he fails to add a "happiness of expression" on all of his subjects.

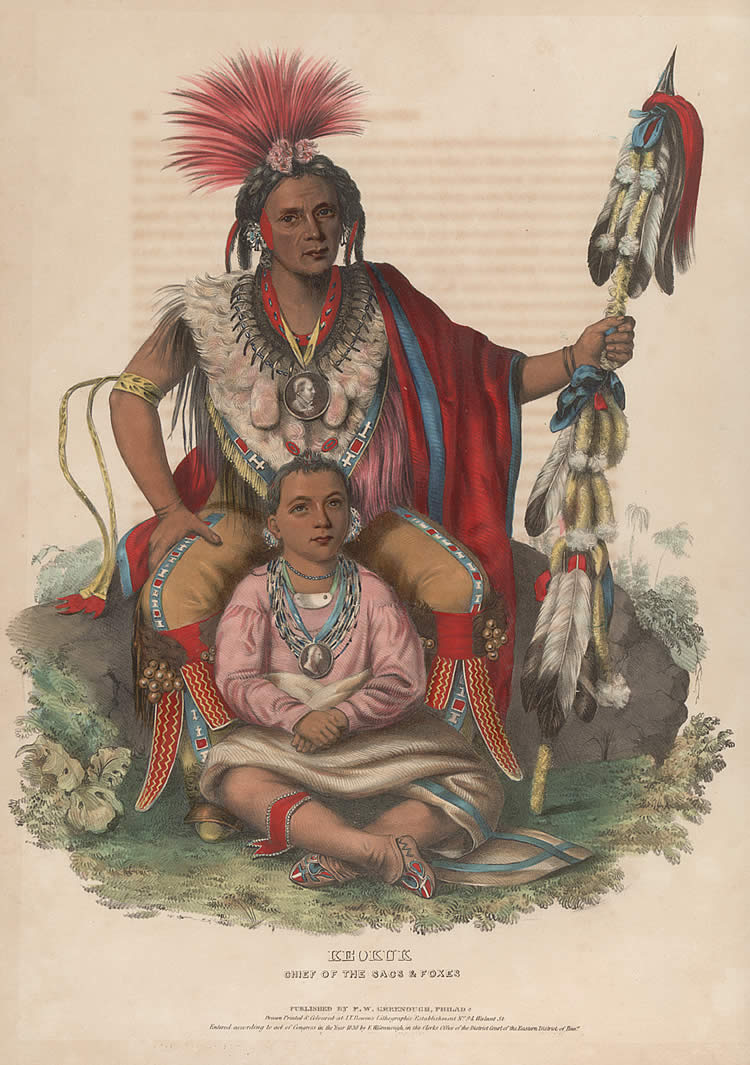
Charles Bird King, Keokuk, Chief of the Sacs and Foxes, ca. 1838

King's depictions of Native American subjects have particularly been questioned. In some cases, King's portrayal of Native American men as "muscular" and having "large stature" has been seen as conforming to the stereotype of the "noble savage." However, the cultural elements that King added into his portraits granted insight on the rich culture of Native American tribes. The hairstyles, facial designs, and robes often provide authentic documentation of Native American culture. Some art historians continue to critique the accuracy of the cultural elements that King put into his Native American portraits.

A Native American portrait that was notably criticized is King's Keokuk, Chief of the Sacs and Foxes. Some art historians have argued that the Native American tribal leader being depicted in King's artwork has been "radically decontextualized" and has been painted in such a way that emphasizes a "viewer's cultural superiority." However, others have argued the opposite. This particular piece has been praised for its representation of "ethnographic elements in its true sense" and is said to have portrayed an "accurate record of a Sauk or Fox chief."

== The Poor Artist's Cupboard ==
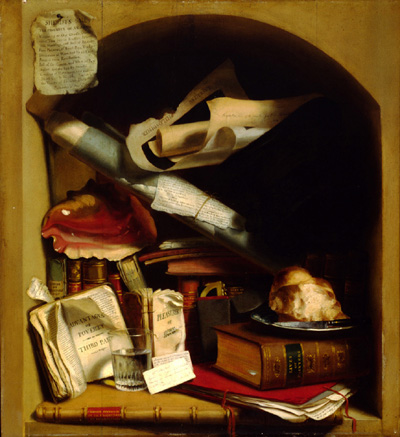
The Poor Artist's Cupboard, c. 1815

In King's The Poor Artist's Cupboard, he attempts to criticize how "Philadelphians preferred reading about art exhibitions rather than purchasing art themselves." As an artist who only profited off of others buying his art, King became upset over the lack of art patronage in the academy's exhibitions in Philadelphia and turned his criticisms into art. Through the depiction of the cup of water and piece of bread that surrounds the flurry of news articles in the cupboard, King tries to send the message that artists are starving because of the lack of commissions being offered to artists.

Although King meant for The Poor Artist's Cupboard to be a criticism towards the general public, some art historians have praised his piece for being a gracious representation of "illusionism" and "effectively artistic in technique and design."

== Gallery ==
=== Portraits ===
Portraits by Charles Bird King

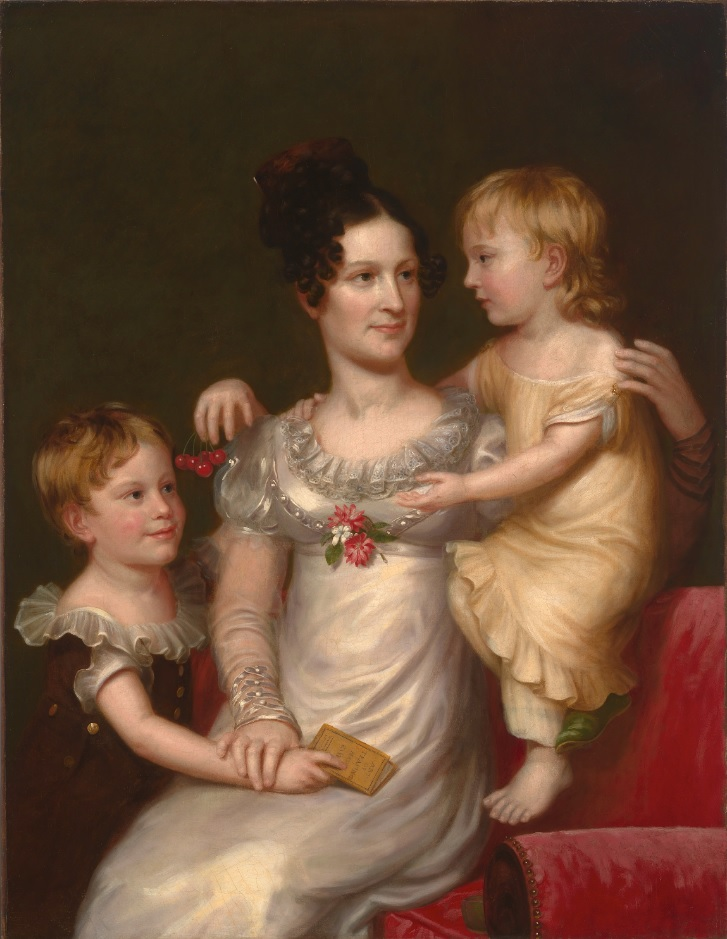
Sarah Weston Seaton, wife of William Winston Seaton, and two of their children, c. 1815

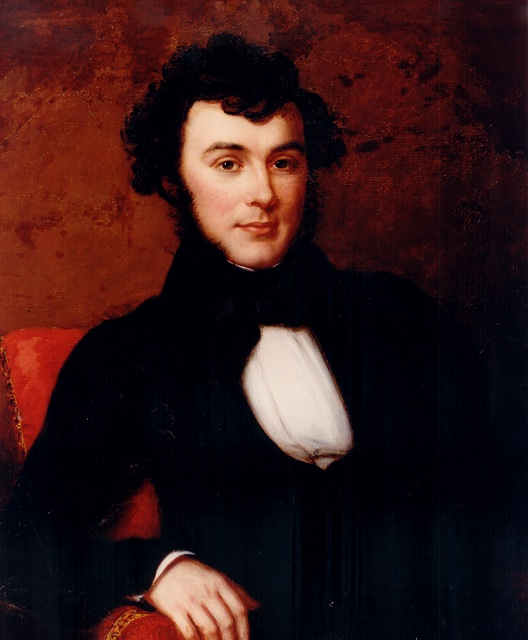
George Washington Adams, c. 1820

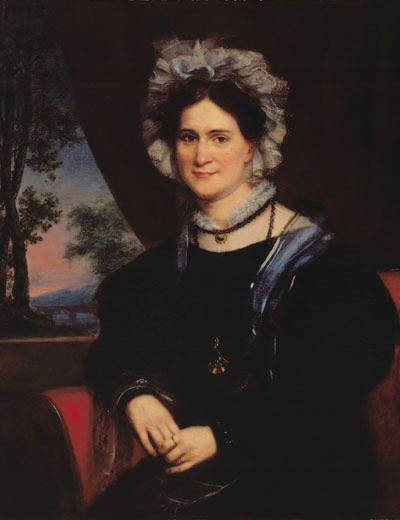
Elizabeth Meade Creighton, c. 1820

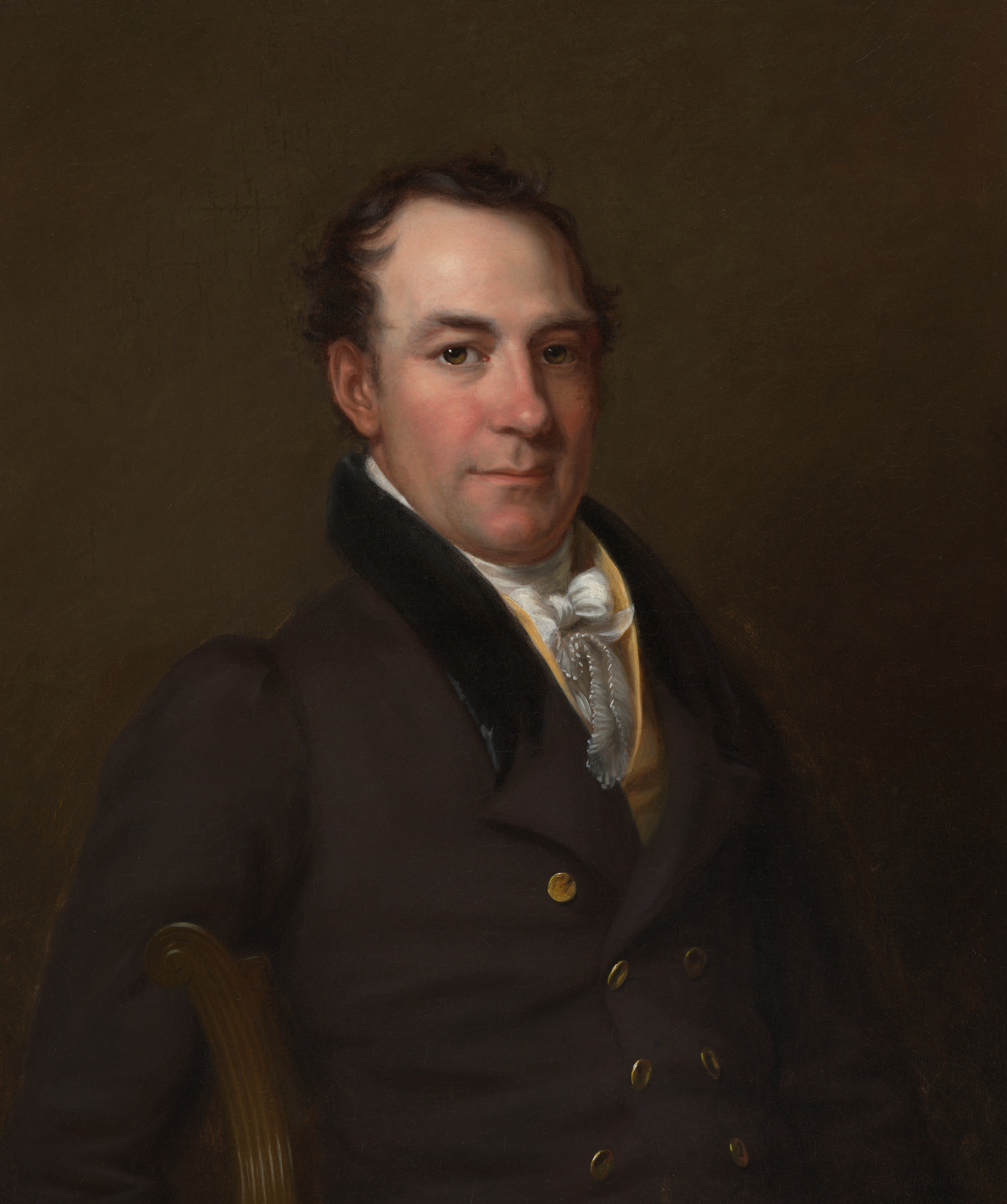
Representative Louis McLane of Delaware, c. 1820

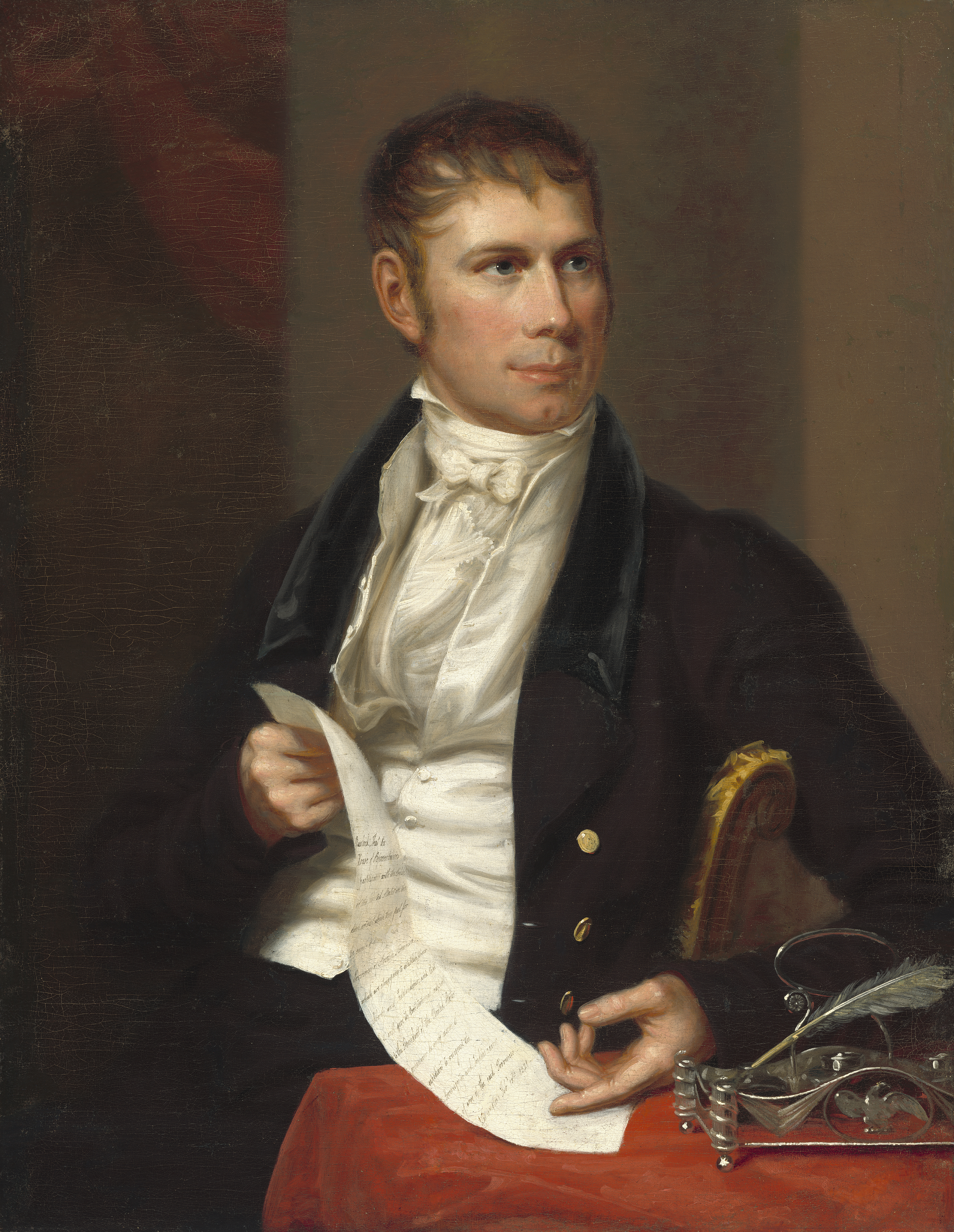
Representative Henry Clay of Kentucky, c. 1821

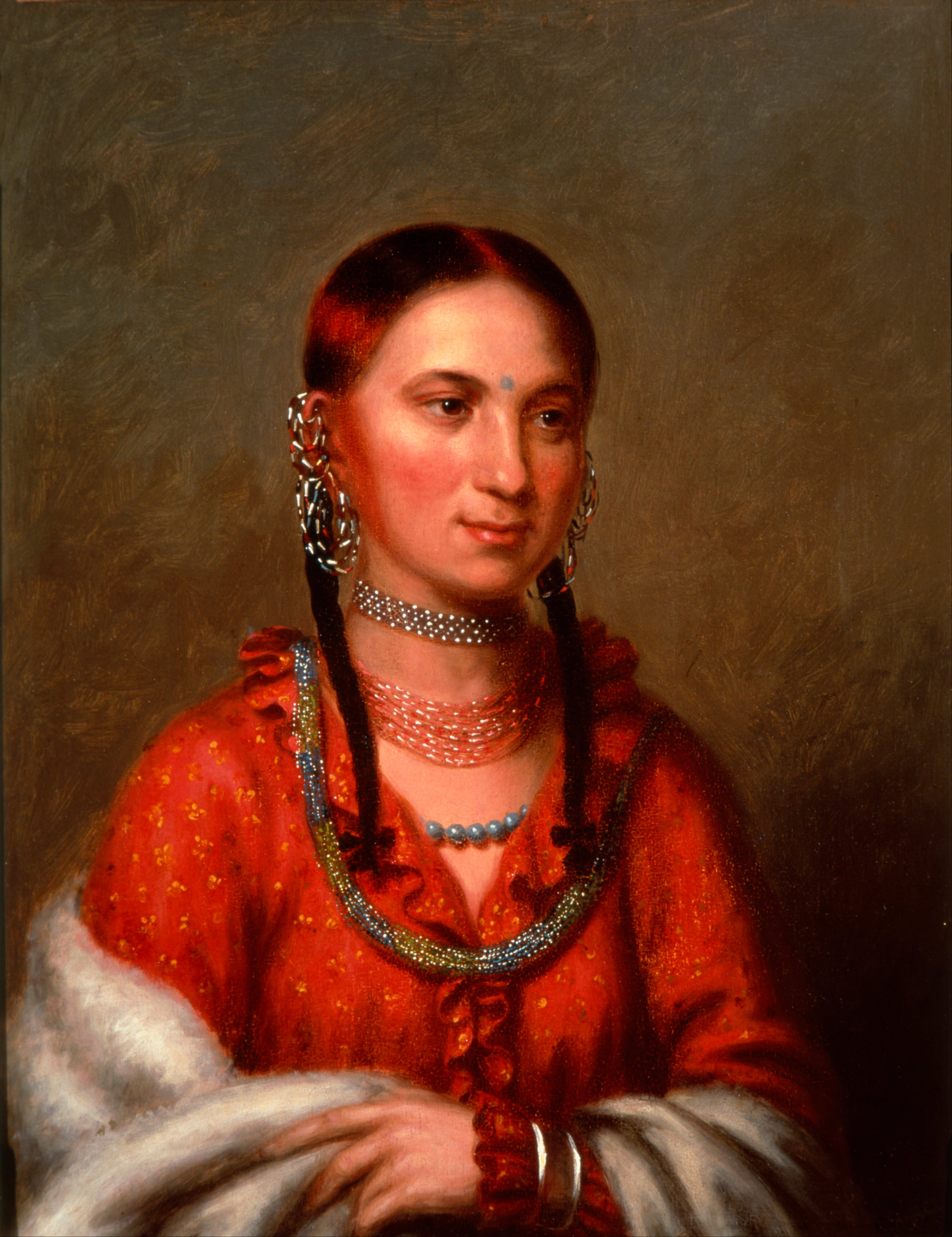
Hayne Hudjihini (Eagle of Delight) Otoe c. 1822

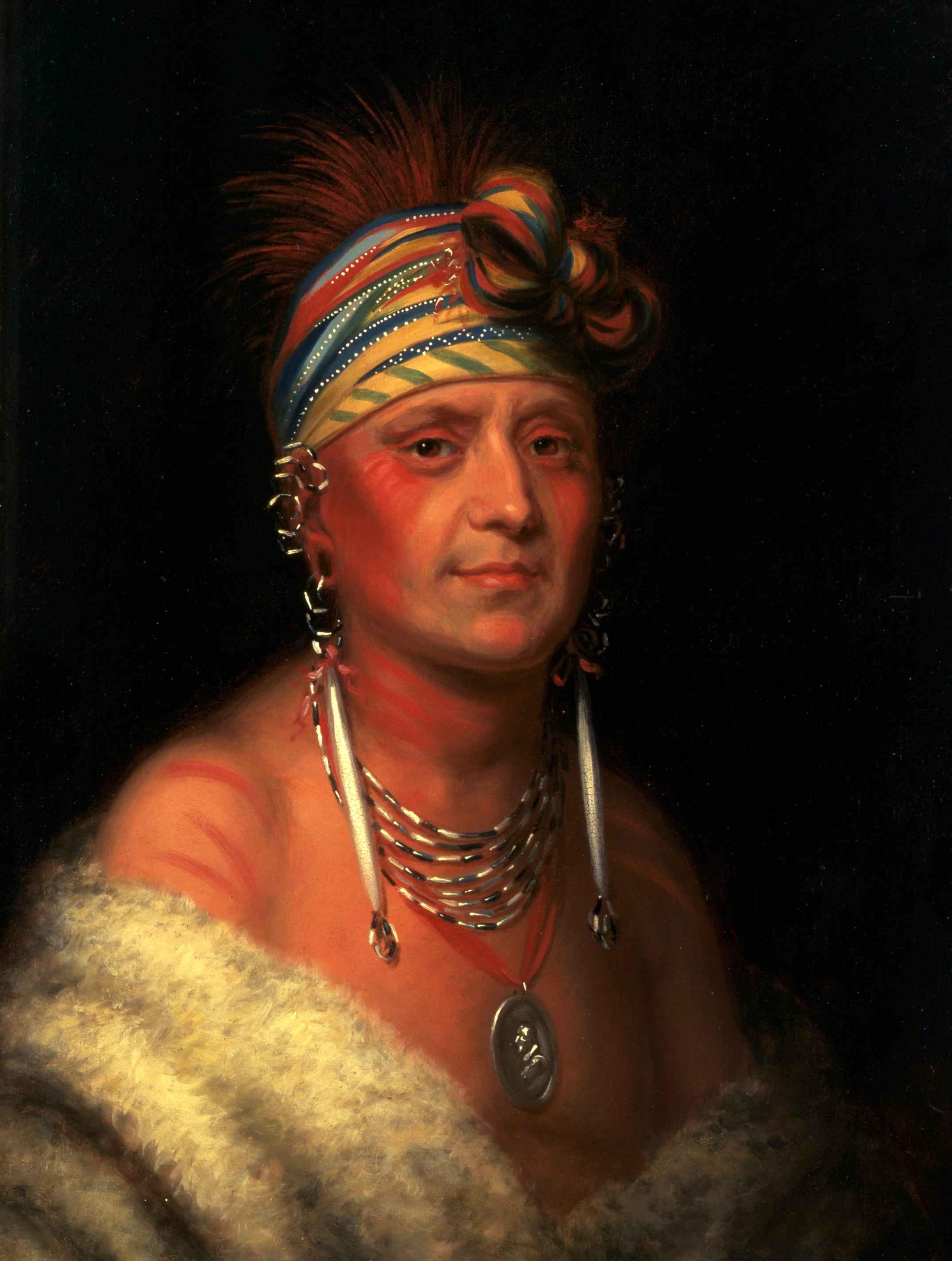
Monchousia (White Plume) Kansa c. 1822

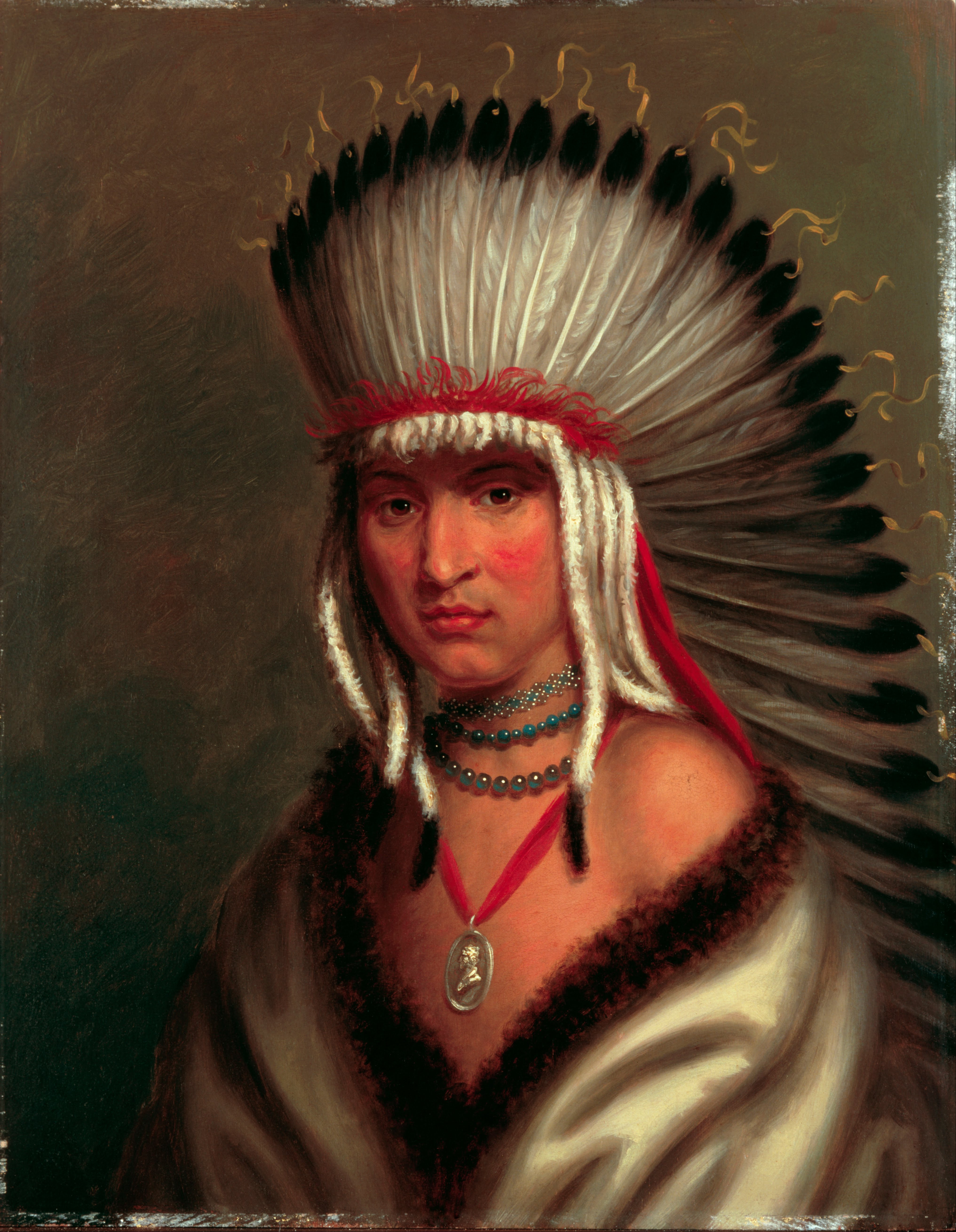
Petalesharo (Generous Chief) Pawnee c. 1822

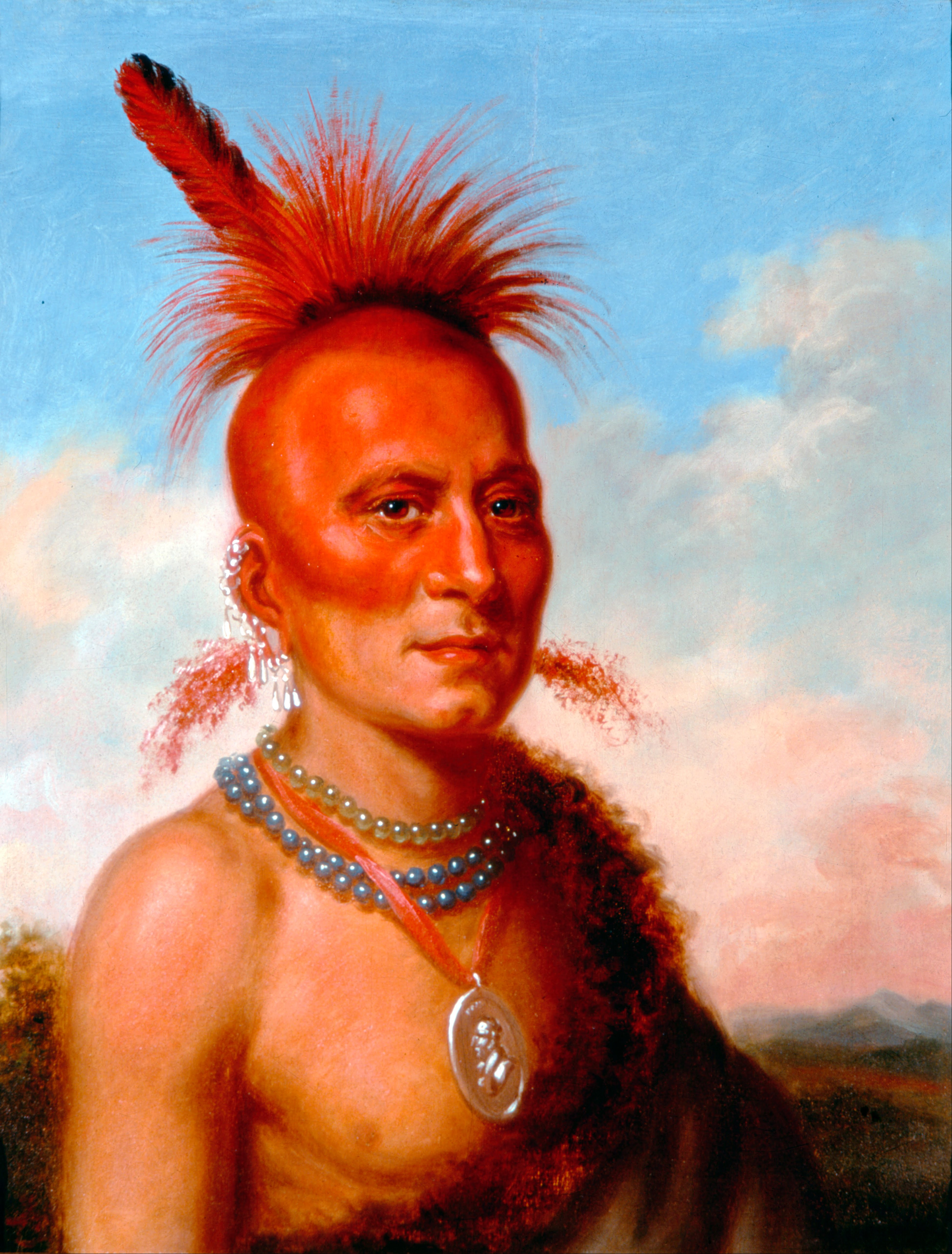
Sharitarish (Wicked Chief) Pawnee c. 1822

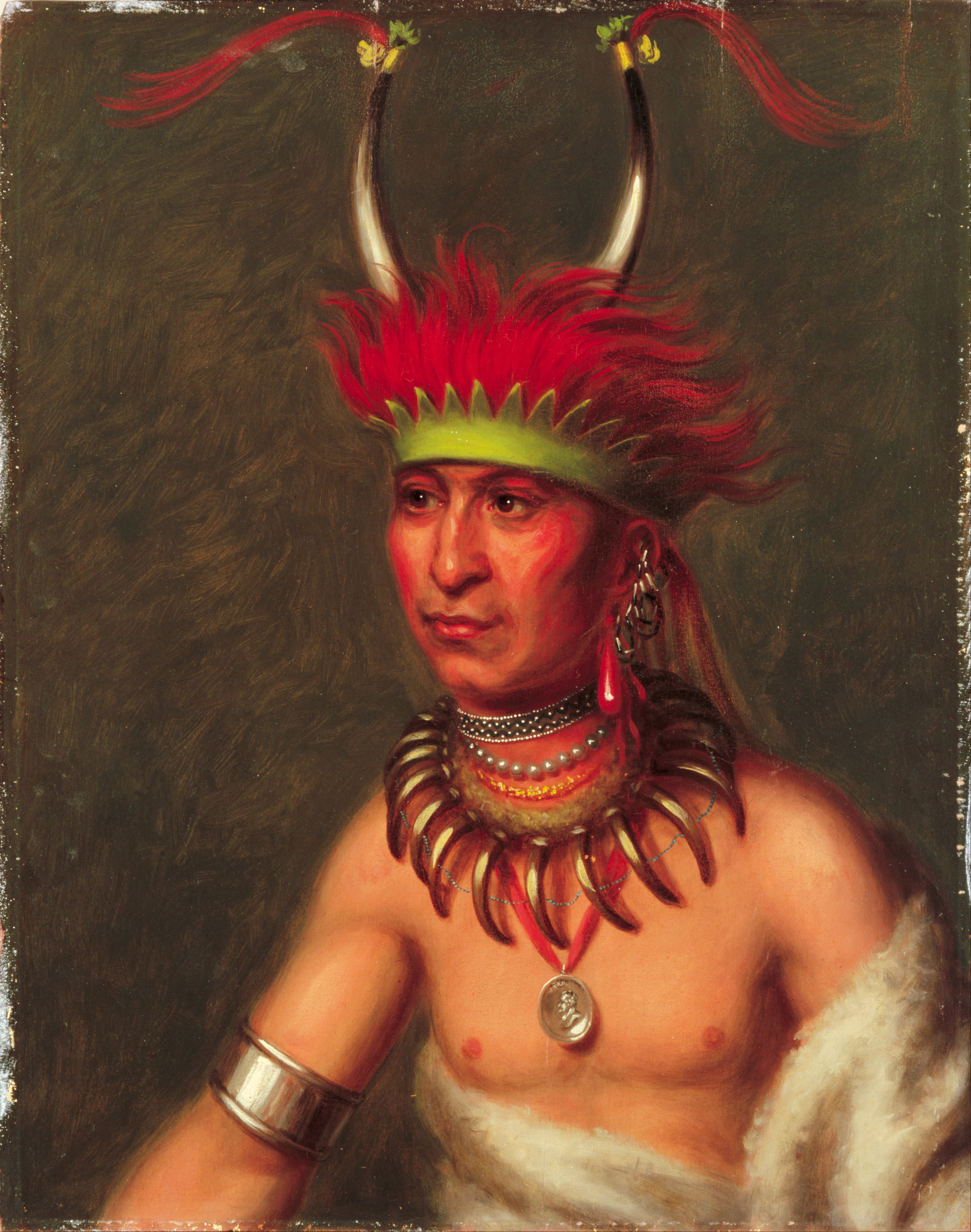
Shaumonekusse (Prairie Wolf) Otoe c. 1822

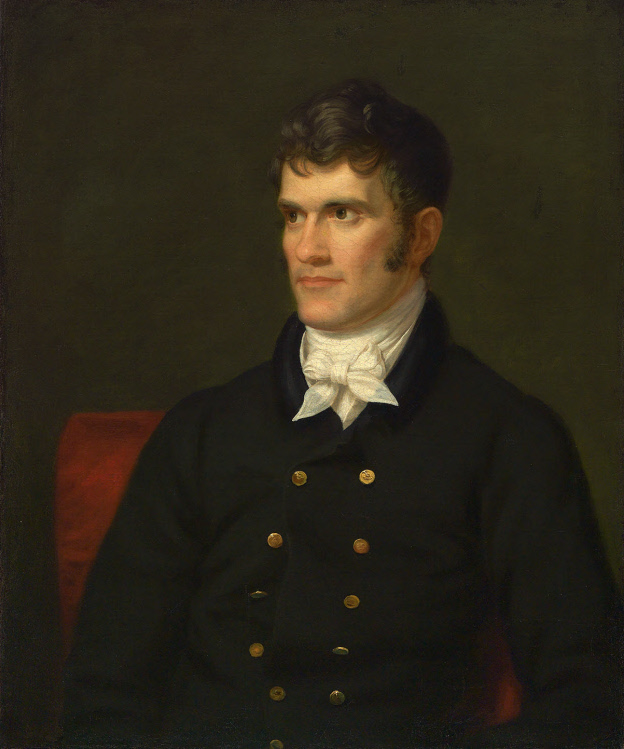
Vice President John C. Calhoun, c. 1822

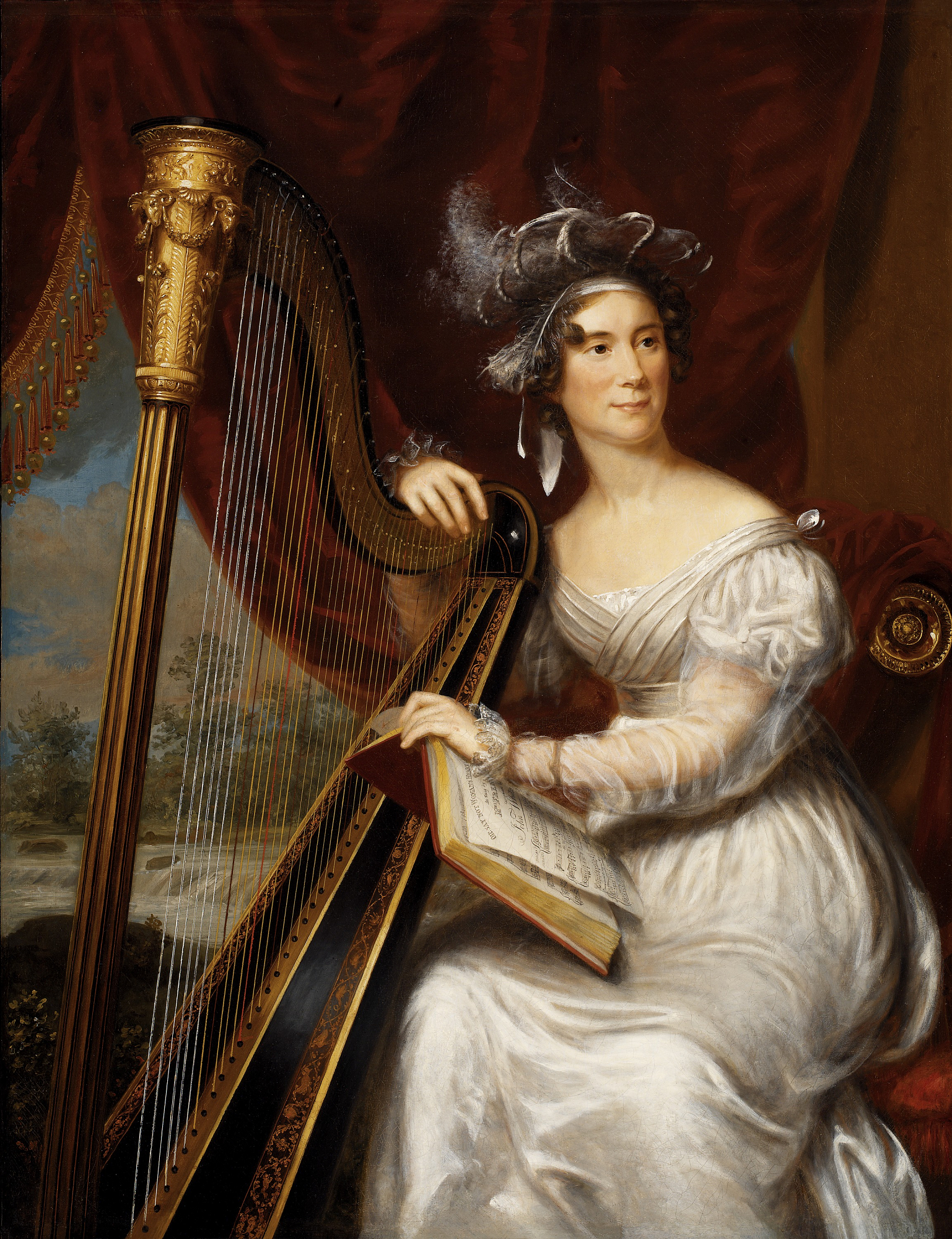
First Lady Louisa Adams, c. 1821–1825

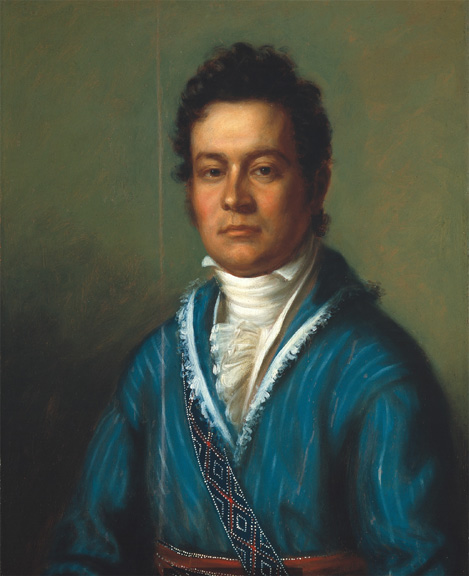
David Vann, later Treasurer of the Cherokee Nation, c. 1825

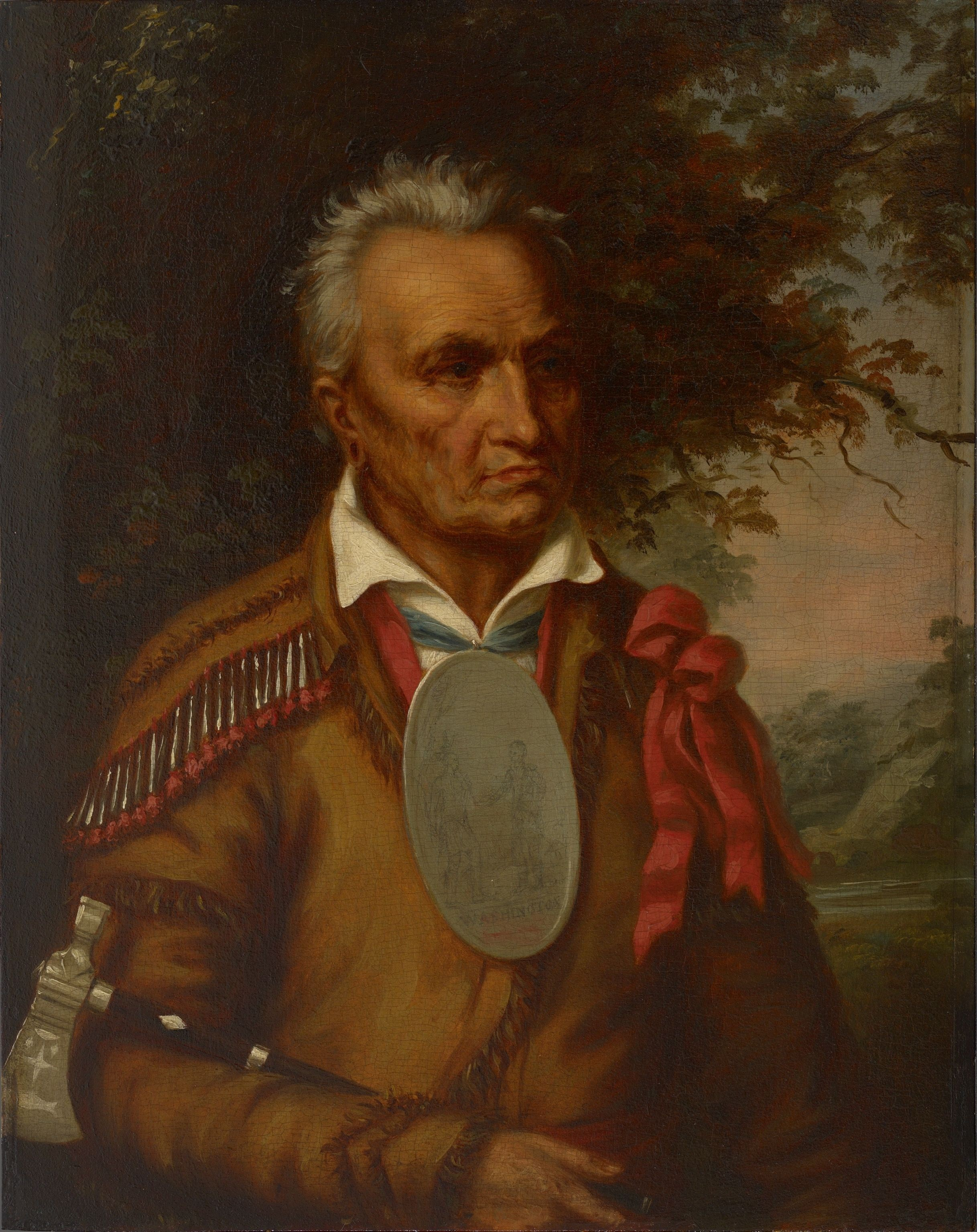
Red Jacket, Sagoyewatha, or Keeper Awake - A Seneca War Chief, c. 1828

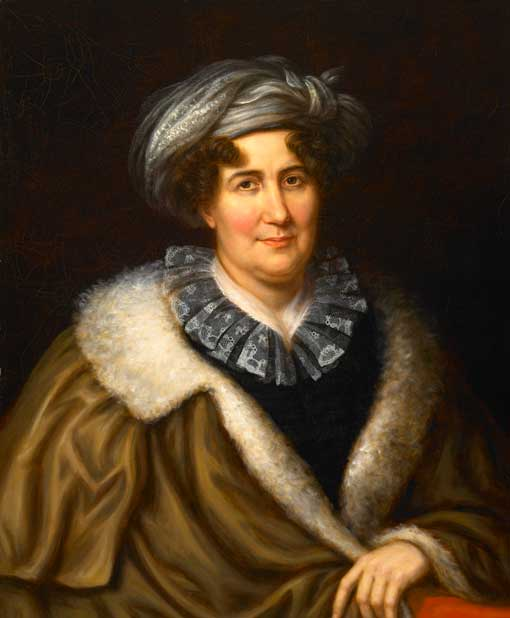
Novelist and biographer Margaret Bayard Smith, c. 1829

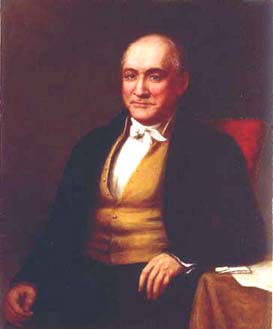
Senator Joseph Kent of Maryland, before 1837

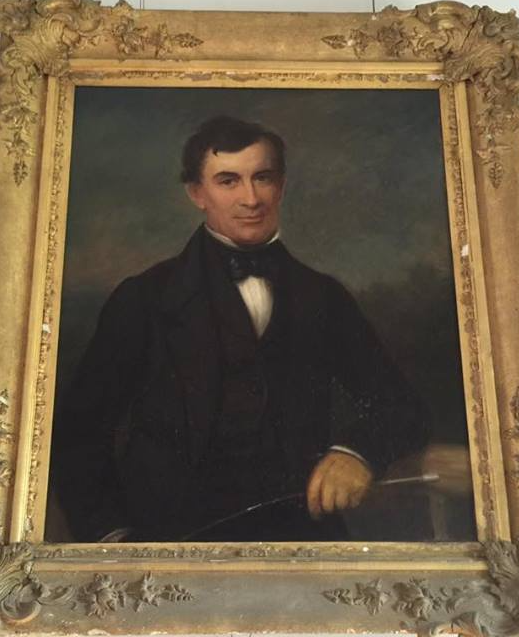
Plantation owner William Henry Tayloe, after 1837

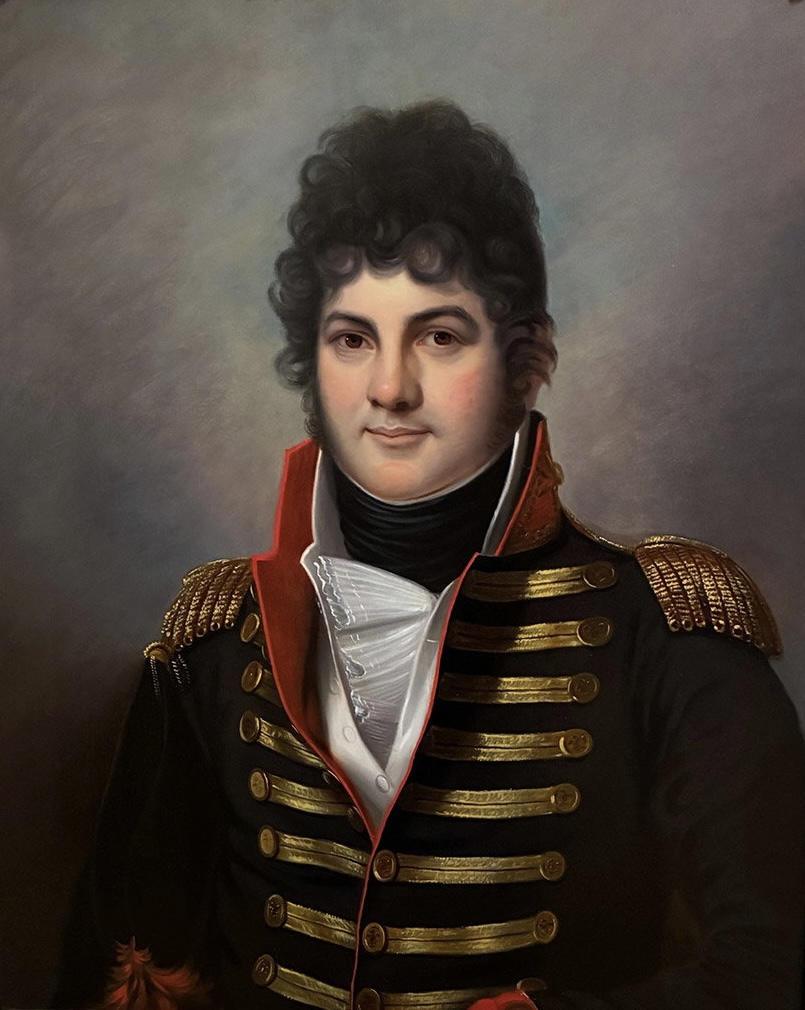
Governor George Izard of the Arkansas Territory, c. 1862

=== Lithographs of Native Americans ===
Lithographs from Thomas L. McKenney & James Hall. History of the Indian Tribes of North America. Philadelphia: F.W. Greenough, 1838–1844

Lithographs of Native Americans by Charles Bird King

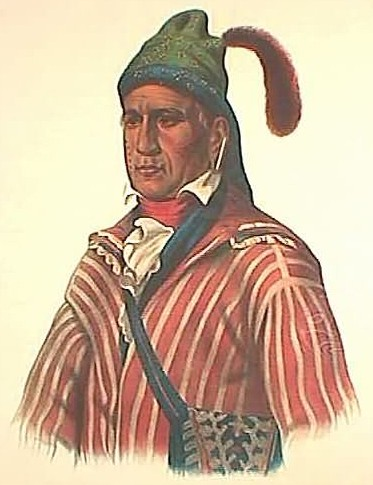
Menawa, a Creek chief

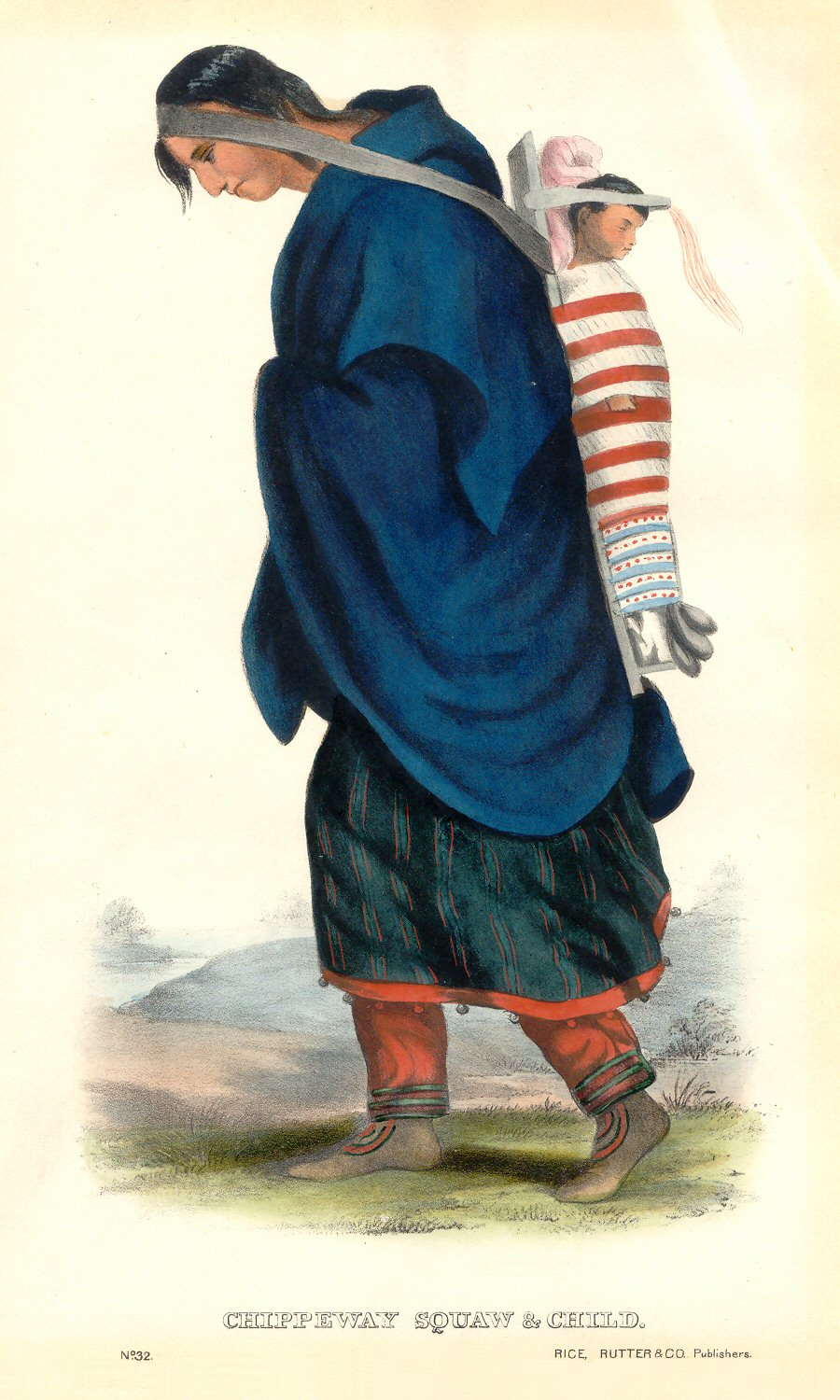
Ojibwa woman and child

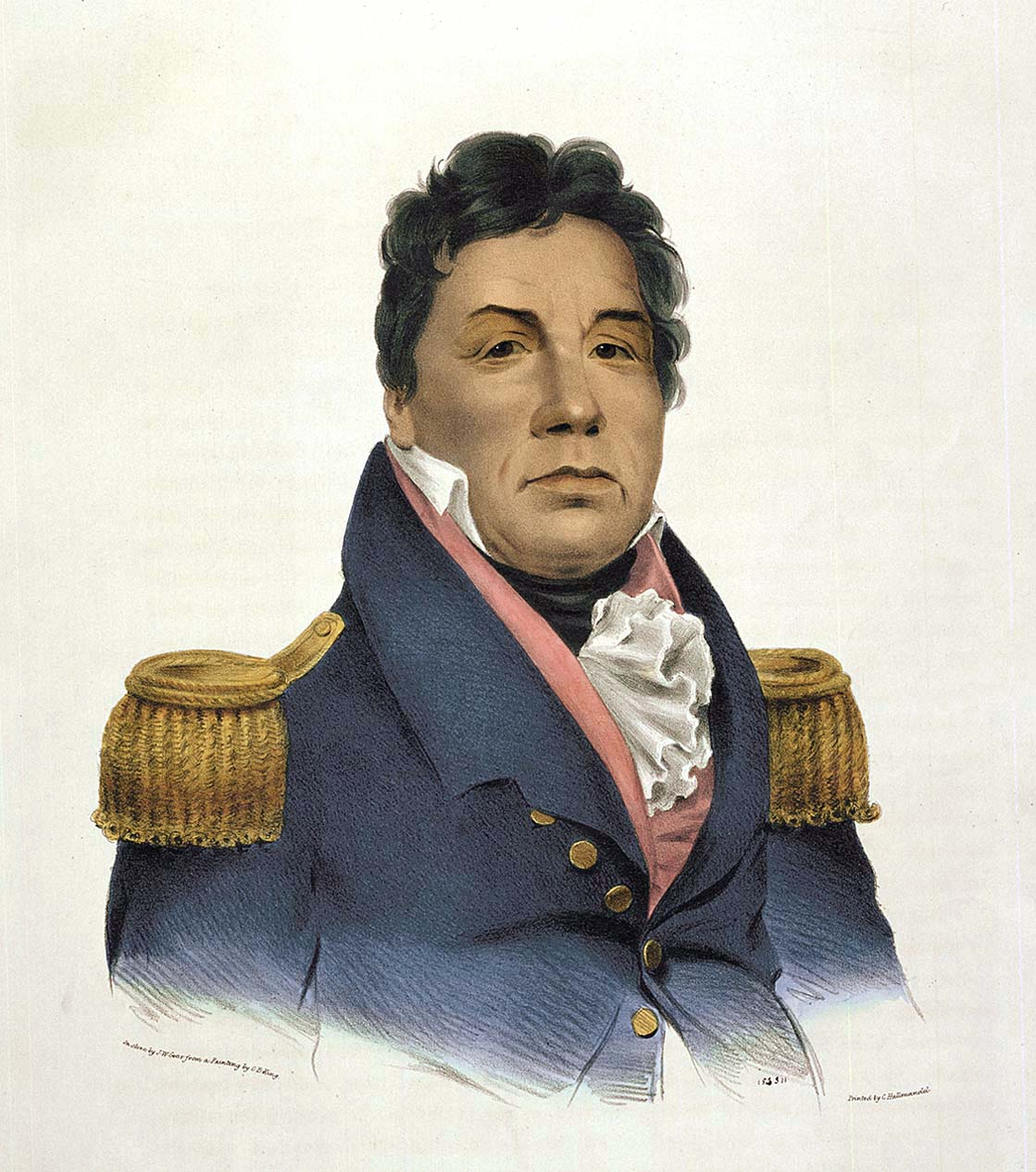
The Choctaw chief Pushmataha, c. 1824

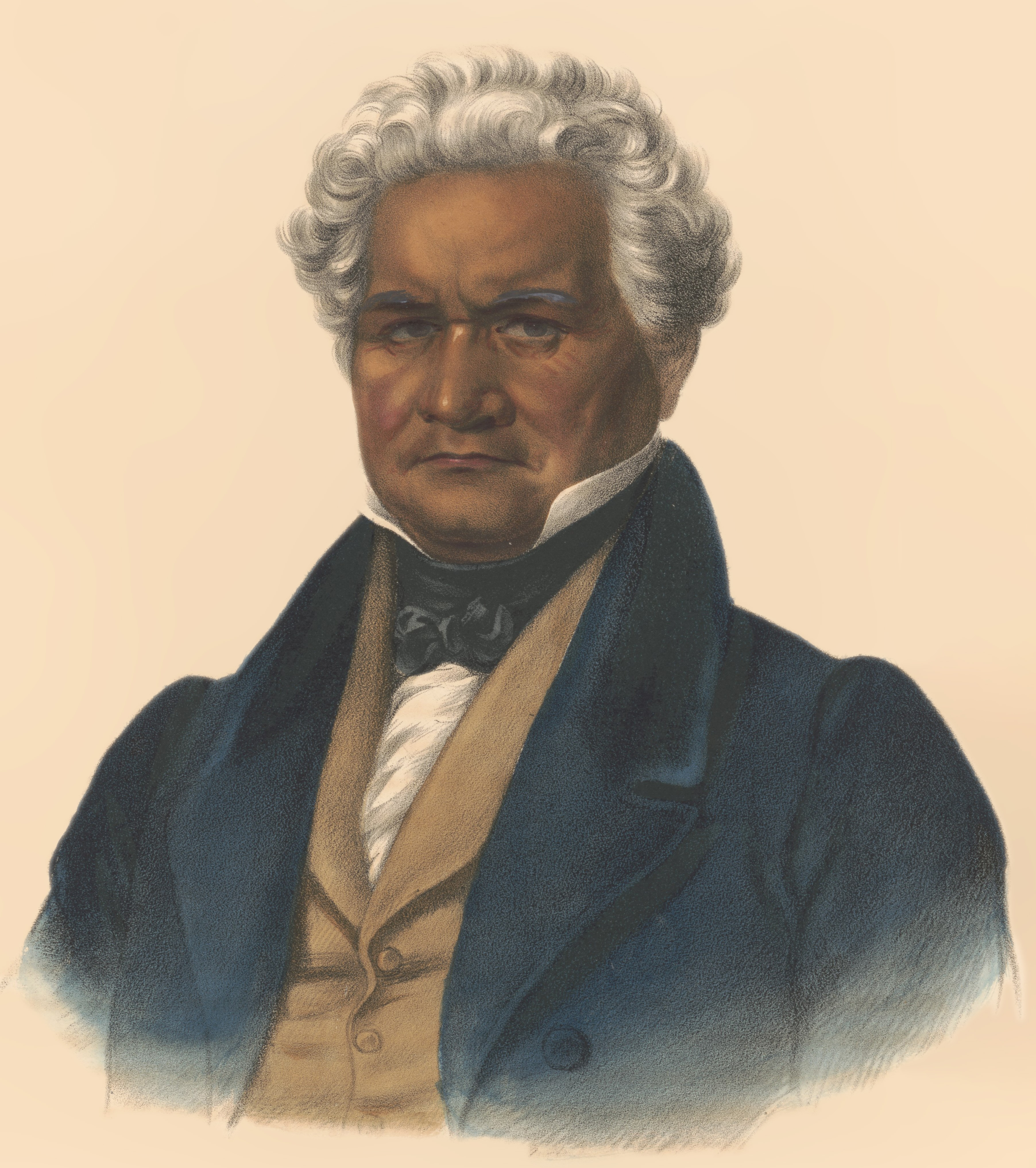
Major Ridge, c. 1834

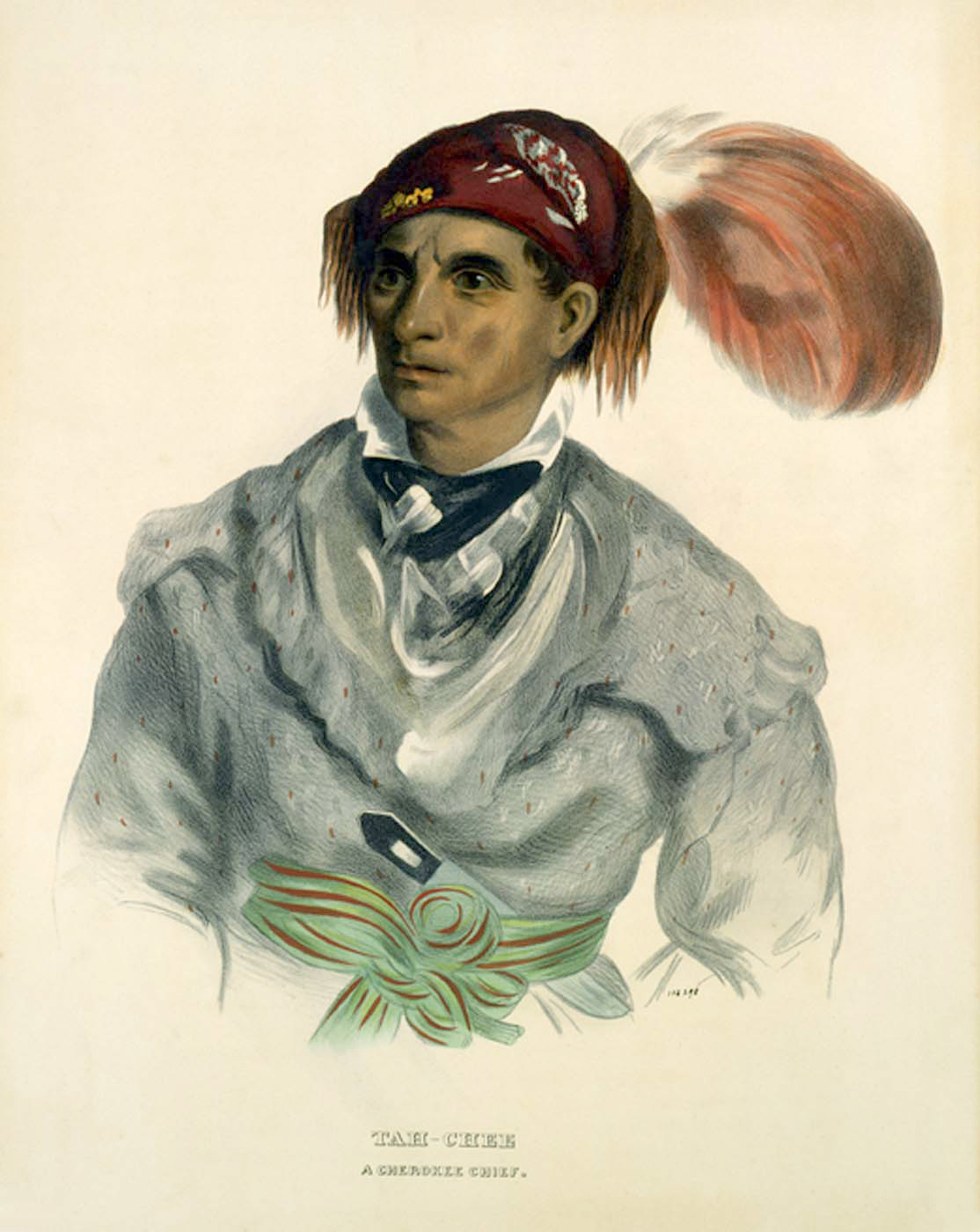
Tah-Chee (Dutch), A Cherokee Chief

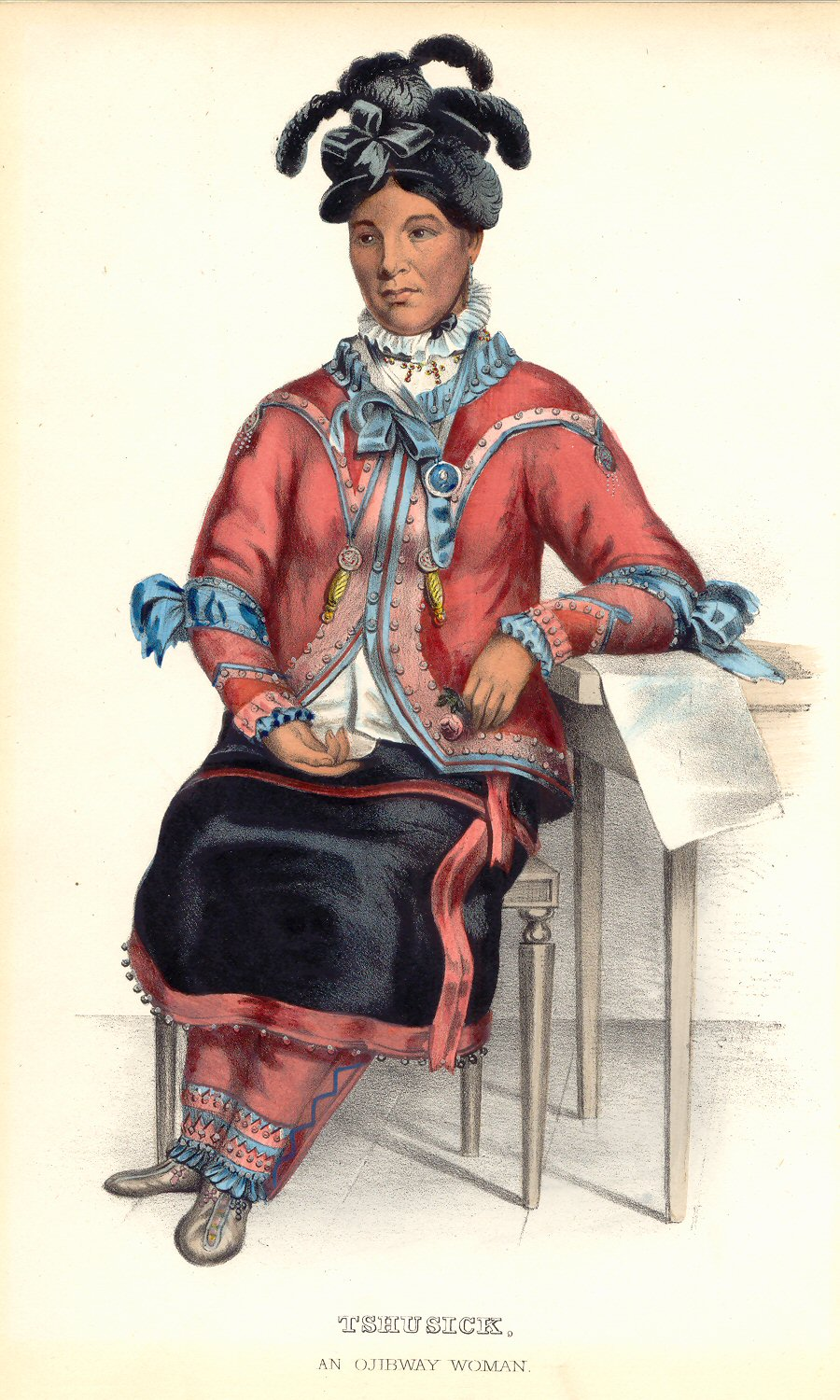
Tshusick, an Ojibwa woman

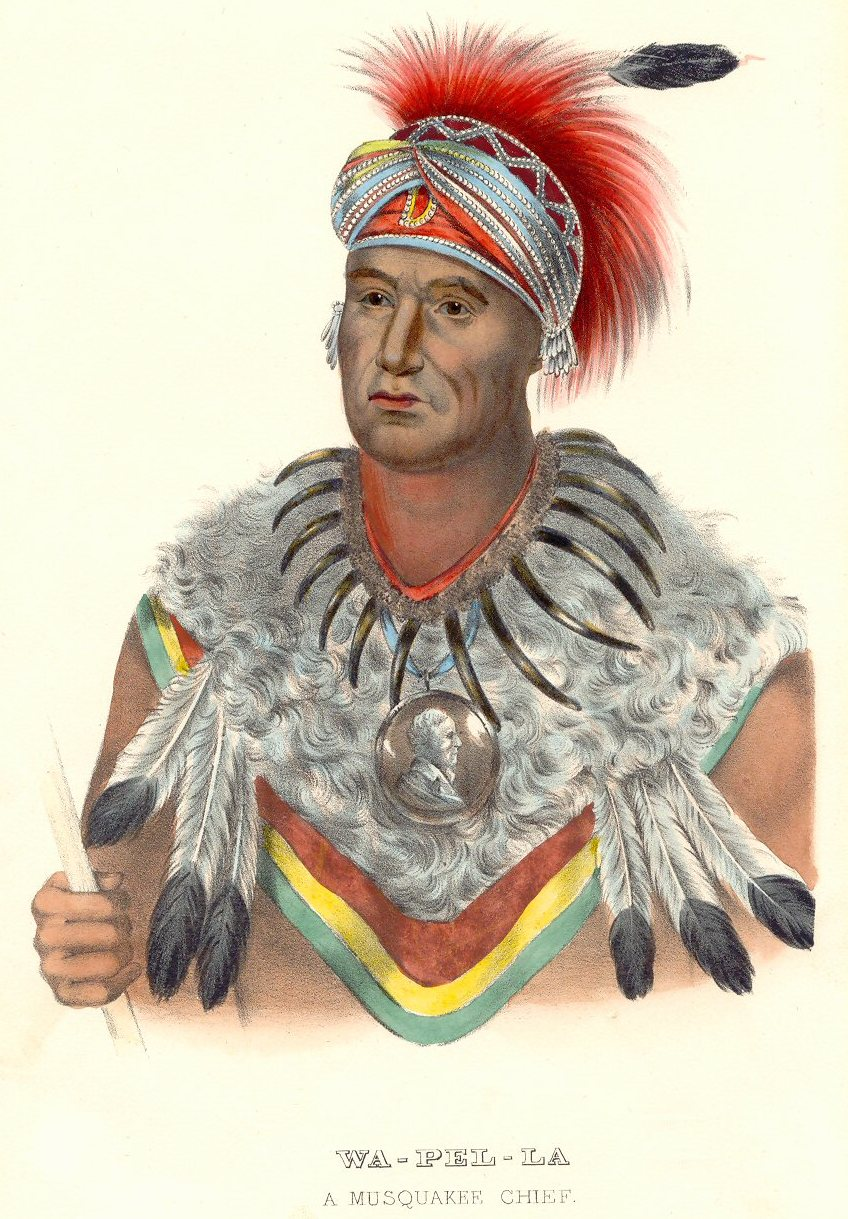
Chief Wapello; "Wa-pel-la the Prince, Musquakee Chief"

=== Still life ===
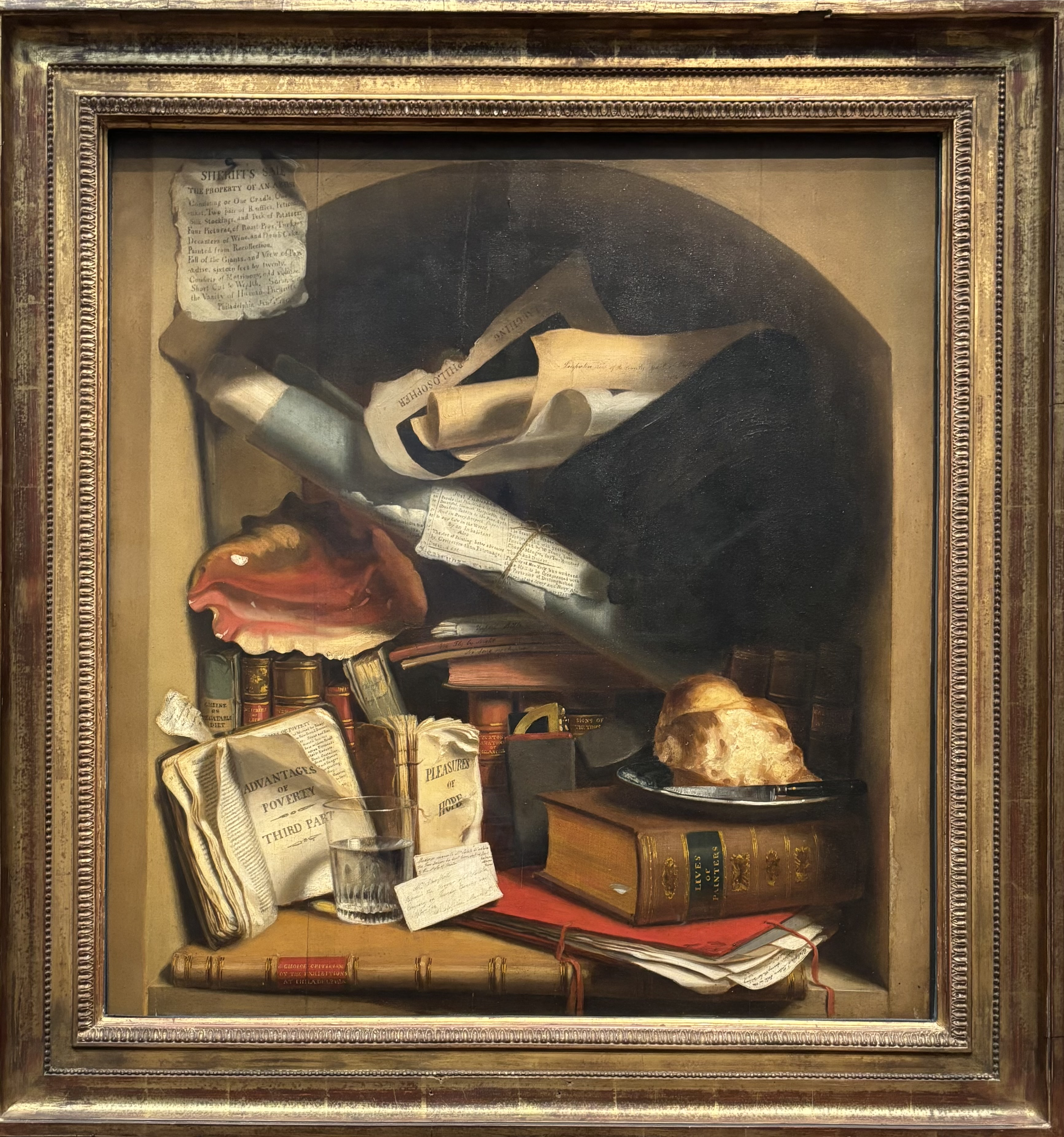
The Poor Artist's Cupboard, c.1815

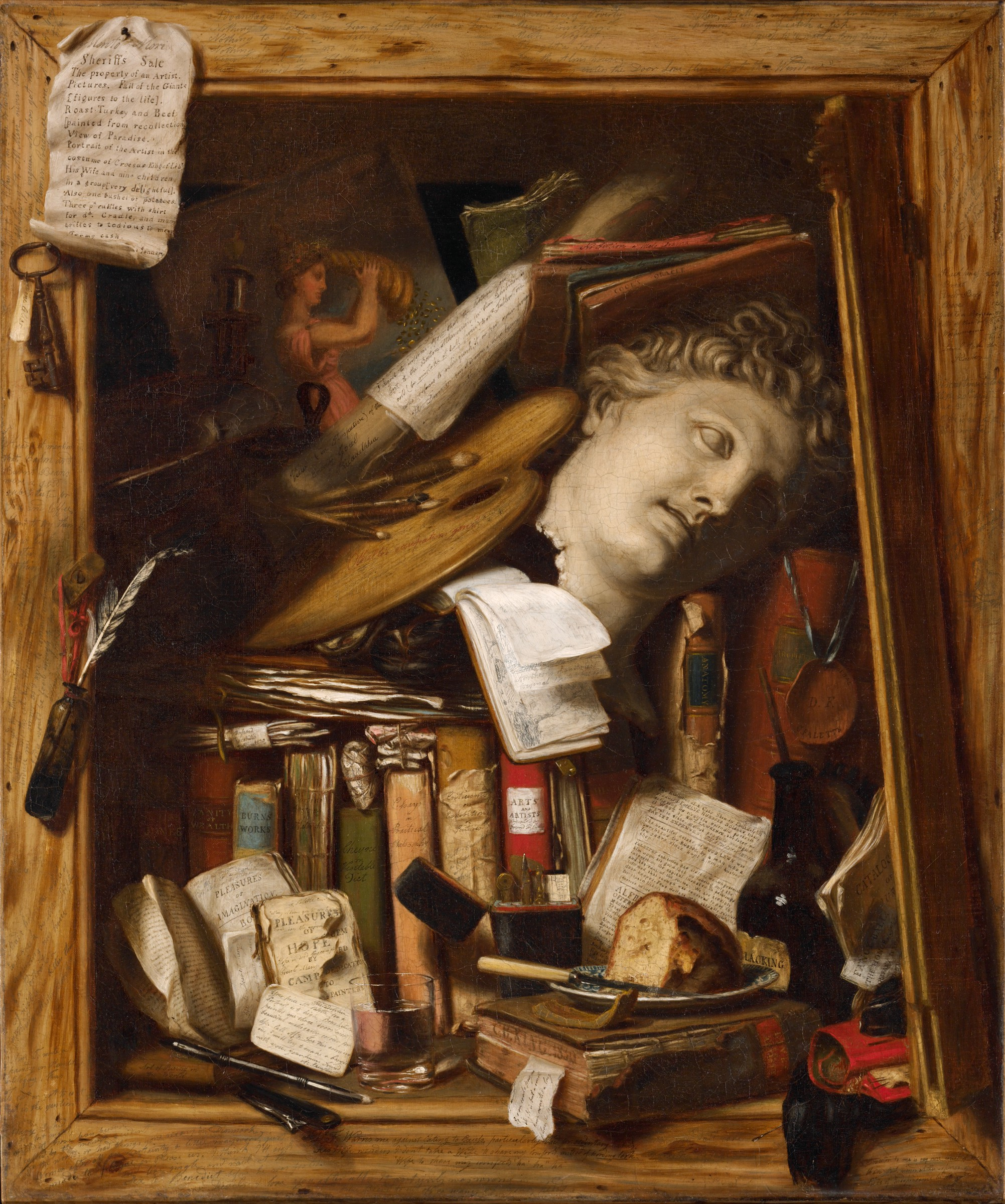
The Vanity of the Artist's Dream, 1942

== Exhibitions ==
- The Annual Exhibition Record of the Pennsylvania Academy of the Fine Arts, Philadelphia, Pennsylvania, August 1813
- Louisville Museum, Louisville, Kentucky, May 1834
- Philadelphia Artists, Philadelphia, Pennsylvania, April 8, 1839
- Artists' Fund Society, Philadelphia, Pennsylvania, c. 1845
- The McKenney & Hall Lithographs of Charles Bird King's Portraits of American Indians, Smithsonian Institution Building, 1990–1996

== Sampling of works ==
- General George Izard (1813) Arkansas Museum of Fine Arts Foundation Collection
- William Pinkey (1815) Maryland Historical Society
- General John Stricker (1816) Maryland Historical Society
- The Poor Artist's Cupboard (c. 1815) National Gallery of Art, formerly in the Corcoran Gallery of Art
- Grandfather's Hobby (c. 1820) Winterthur Museum, Garden and Library
- Wicked Chief (c. 1822) White House Library
- Vanity Of An Artist's Dream (1830) Fogg Art Museum, Harvard University
- Fruit Piece with Pineapples (1840) John S. H. Russell, Newport, Rhode Island
- Young Omahaw, War Eagle, Little Missouri, and Pawnees (c. 1821) Smithsonian American Art Museum, Smithsonian Institution
- Hoowaunneka [Little Elk], Winnebago, (1828), Peabody Museum, Harvard University.
- Wajechai [Crouching Eagle], (1824), Gulf States Paper Corporation, Tuscaloosa, Alabama.
- Pushmataha, The Sapling is Ready for Him, (1824), Gulf States Paper Corporation Collection, Tuscaloosa, Alabama.
- Joseph Porus [Polis], Penobscot, (1842), Thomas Gilcrease Institute of American History and Art, Tulsa, Oklahoma.

== See also ==
- Elbridge Ayer Burbank
- George Catlin
- Seth Eastman
- Paul Kane
- W. Langdon Kihn
- Joseph Henry Sharp
- John Mix Stanley
