= Chono Ca Pe =

Chief of the Otoe tribe

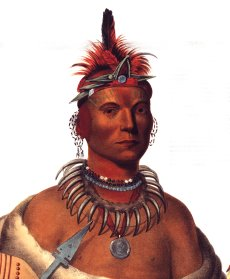
Chono Ca Pe, painted by Charles Bird King

Chono Ca Pe was a Native American chief of the Otoe tribe. He was a member of the O'Fallon delegation of 1821.
