= Sharitahrish =

Pawnee chief

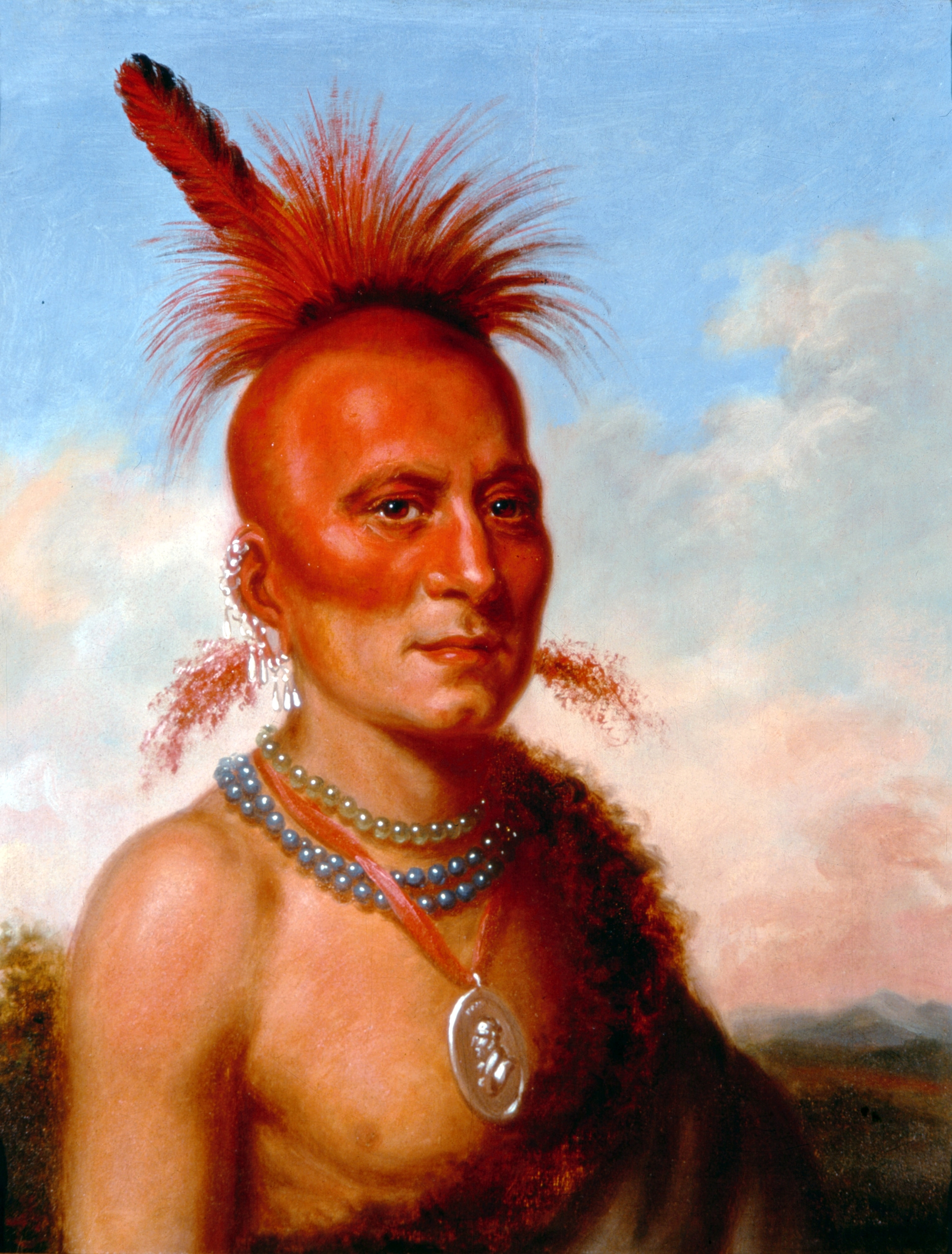
1822 portrait of Sharitahrish by Charles Bird King, on display in the Library of the White House

Sharitahrish was a Pawnee chief. He was descended from a line of chiefs and, according to the law of descents, which selects the next of kin who is worthy of succession, succeeded his elder brother, Tarecawawaho (Long Hair or Big Hair). They were sons of Sharitahrish, the first, a chief, who is mentioned in Pike's Expedition under the name of Characterish.

== Relations with American government ==
When Tarecawawaho (Long Hair or Big Hair) was invited to visit the United States President James Monroe, he refused to do so, upon the ground that it would be too great a condescension. The Pawnees, he asserted, were the greatest people in the world, and himself the most important chief. He was willing to live at peace with the American people, and to conciliate the government by reciprocating their acts of courtesy. But he argued that the President could not bring as many young men into the field as himself; that he did not own as many horses, nor maintain as many wives; that he was not so distinguished a brave, and could not exhibit as many scalps taken in battle; and that therefore he would not consent to call him his great Father. He did not object, however, to return the civilities of the President, by sending a delegation composed of some of his principal men; and among those selected to accompany Indian Agent Benjamin O'Fallon to Washington on this occasion, was his brother Sharitahrish. Sharitahrish returned with enlarged views of the numbers and power of the white men, and with a more accurate assessment of the relative power of his nation.

As he traveled over the broad expanse of the American territory, Sharitahrish became convinced of the vast disparity between his nation and the white man, and was satisfied that his people would suffer great loss by a state of warfare with that power.

== Death and succession ==
Sharitahrish, the second, was a chief of noble form and fine bearing; he was six feet tall, and well proportioned; and when mounted on the fiery steed of the prairie, was a graceful and very imposing personage. His people looked upon him as a great brave, and the young men especially regarded him as a person who was designed to great distinction. After his return from Washington, his popularity increased so greatly as to excite the jealousy of his elder brother, Tarecawawaho, the head chief, who, however, did not long survive that event. He died a few weeks after the return of Sharitahrish, who succeeded him, but who also died during the succeeding autumn, at the age of little more than thirty years. He was succeeded by his younger brother Iskatappe (Rich Man or Wicked Chief), a name given to him by the Omahas.
