= Young Omahaw, War Eagle, Little Missouri, and Pawnees =

1821 painting by Charles Bird King

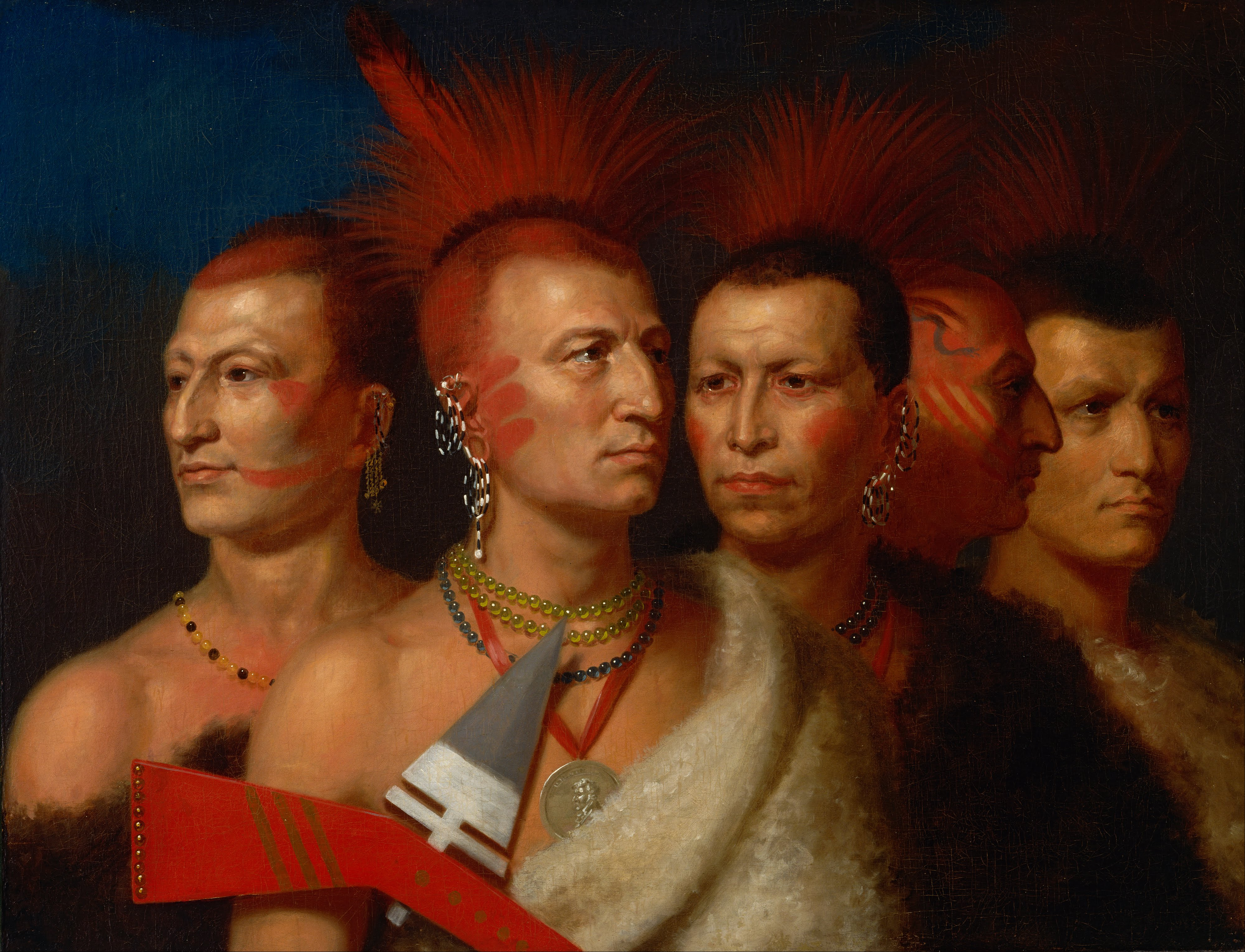
- Artist: Charles Bird King
- Year: 1821
- Medium: Oil on canvas
- Dimensions: 71.1 cm × 91.8 cm (28.0 in × 36.1 in)
- Location: Smithsonian American Art Museum

Young Omahaw, War Eagle, Little Missouri, and Pawnees is an 1821 painting by the American portrait artist Charles Bird King (1785–1862), who is best known for his portrayals of significant Native American leaders and tribesmen.

The painting portrays Plains Indian chiefs, who among many others traveled to Washington to meet with the president to negotiate Native American territorial rights with the government. At the White House, the Capitol, and in private homes, policymakers employed bribery, dazzle, and intimidation to win the cooperation of these men. In his Seventh Street studio, Charles Bird King painted their portraits, creating a gallery of allies in the government's plan to settle the Indian question peacefully.

Young Omahaw, War Eagle, Little Missouri, and Pawnees portrays Chief War Eagle with a presidential peace medal, valued by Native Americans as a sign of status and worn on all formal occasions. King painted the chiefs with a war axe, blood-red face paint, and eagle feathers atop their heads, reinforcing the romantic image of Indians as savages.
