= Eagle of Delight =

Native American woman (c. 1795 – 1822)

- Hayne Hudjihini
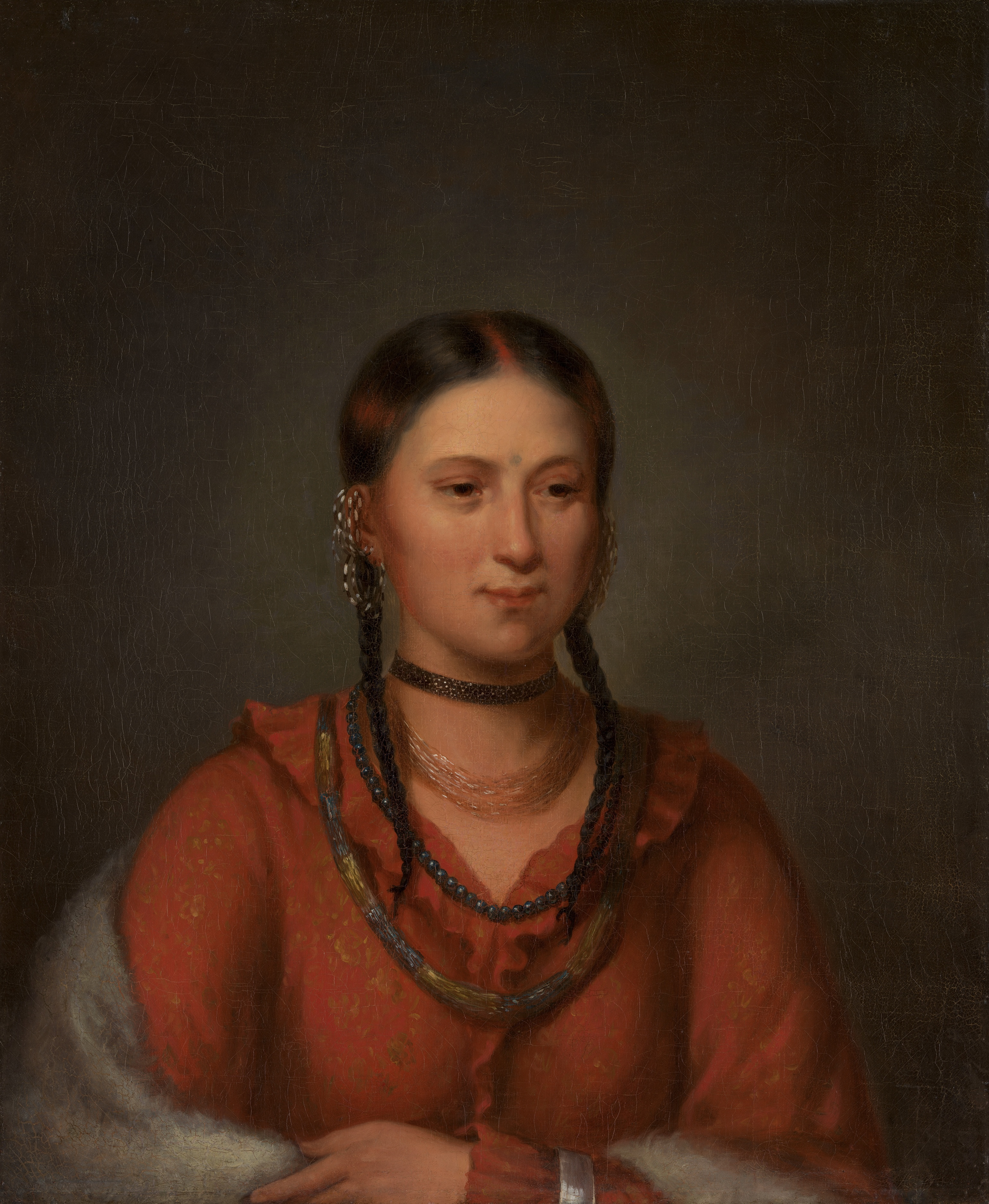
- Posthumous portrait by Henry Inman, c. 1832–1833

Otoe leader

Personal details
- Born: 1795
- Died: 1822 (aged 26–27) Nebraska
- Cause of death: Measles
- Resting place: Nebraska
- Spouse: Sų Manyi Kathi

Hayne Hudjihini or Eagle of Delight (1795 – 1822) was a prominent Otoe woman from what is now Nebraska.

The daughter of a chief, Hayne Hudjihini belonged to the Eagle clan. She became one of the five wives of Chief Sų Manyi Kathi, or Shaumonekusse (Otoe, ca. 1785–1837), who belonged to the Bear clan.

== Travels ==
In 1822, Hayne Hudjihini accompanied her husband with an Indian delegation of chiefs to Washington D.C., where they met James Monroe, the President of the United States. She was described by those who met her as beautiful and charming. The Bureau of Indian Affairs (BIA) commissioned Charles Bird King to paint portraits of Hudjihini and Shaumonekusse.

== Death ==
Shortly after her visit, Hayne Hudjihini died of measles, probably contracted during her travels.

== Portrait ==
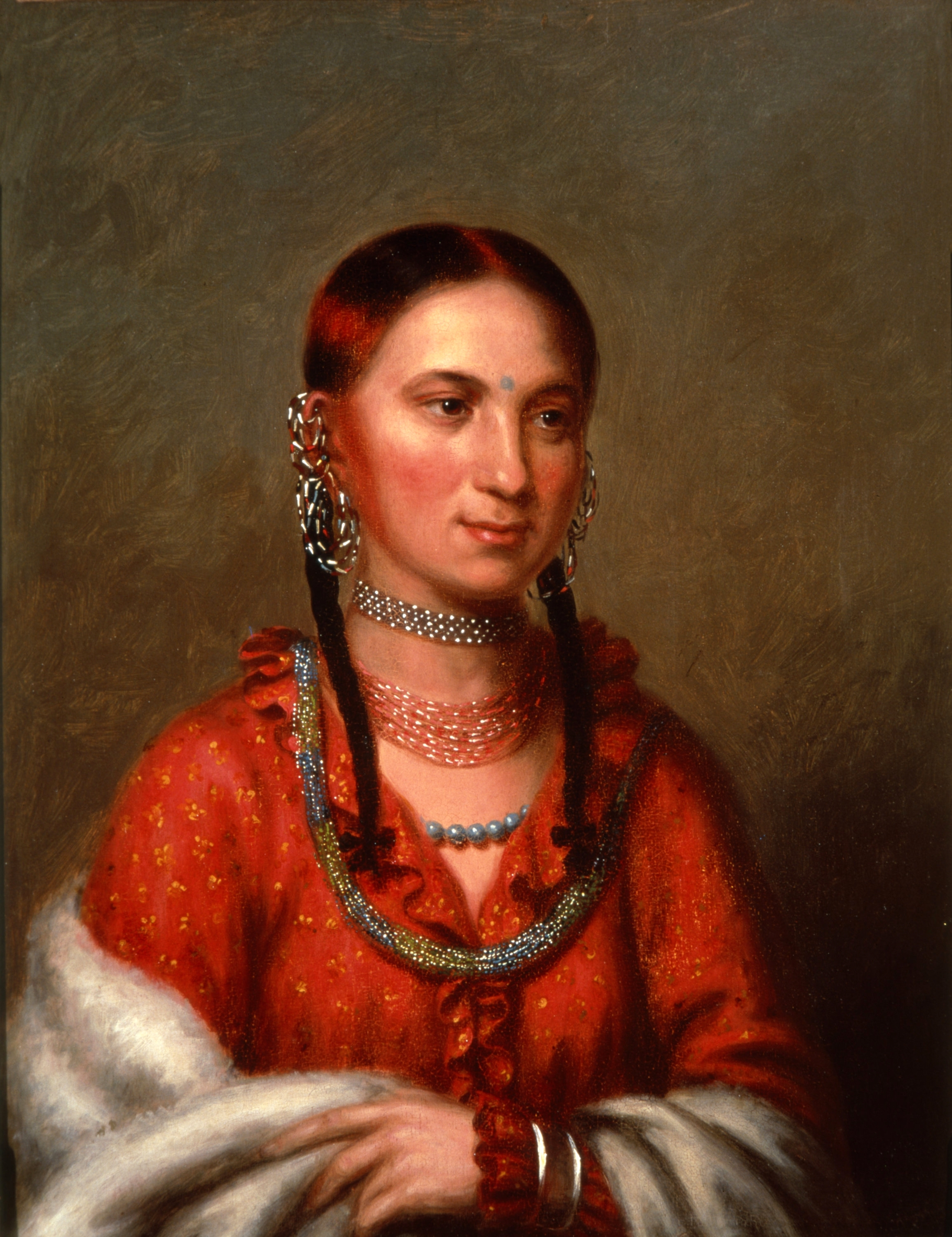
Portrait by Charles Bird King, c. 1822, used in the White House.

When Chief Mahaska of the Ioway tribe saw Eagle of Delight's portrait in winter 1836 and 1837 on a visit to Washington, DC, he was certain that she was his mother. However, at nearby King's gallery, a copy of Eagle of Delight's portrait hung next to the portrait of Rantchewaime (Female Flying Pigeon), his mother, whom he recognized by her fan. It turned out that Mahaska was mistaken because his mother, who had died when he was four, had been a neighbor and close friend of Eagle of Delight. The two women had often dressed in similar colors and braided their hair the same way. The copy of Eagle of Delight's portrait had added the blue forehead spot, the mark of royalty, which helped him tell the two women apart. Arrangements were made to send copies of the paintings to Chief Mahaska and to Shaumonekusse, who were pleased to have a painting of their mother and wife respectively.

Although the original portrait of Eagle of Delight was destroyed in a fire at the Smithsonian Institution in 1865, a patron donated King's personal copy to the White House in 1962. The portrait now hangs in the White House Library.
