= Shaumonekusse =

Otoe chief (d. 1837)

- Shúⁿmáñikathi
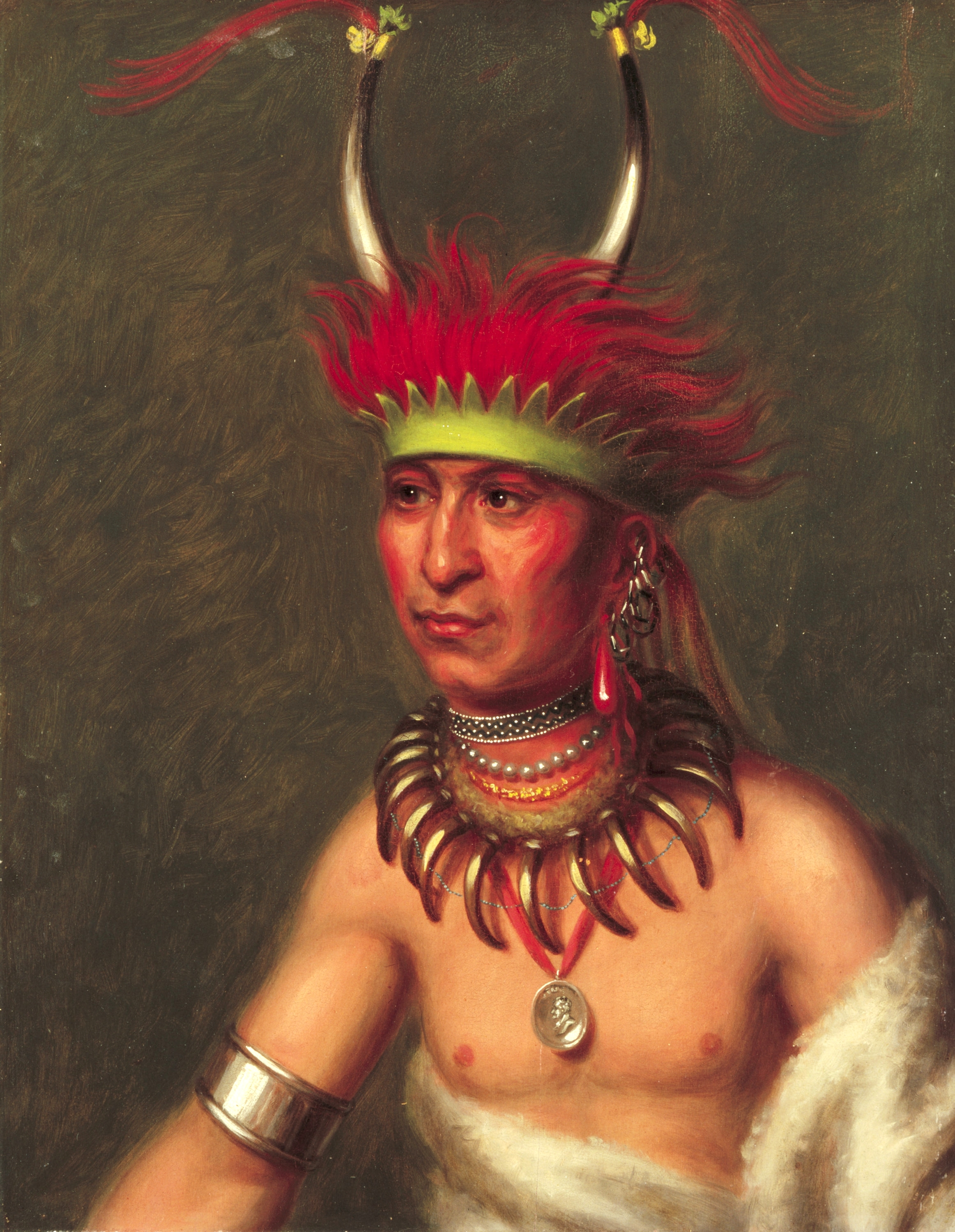
- Portrait of Shaumonekusse, painted by Charles Bird King circa 1822. On display in the White House Library

Otoe leader

Personal details
- Born: c. 1785
- Died: 1837
- Spouse: Eagle of Delight
- Nickname(s): Letan, L'Letan

Chief Shaumonekusse (Iowa-Oto: Shúⁿmáñikathi, c. 1785 – 1837) was a leader of the Otoe Native American tribe in the early 19th century. The Otoe are a Central Plains tribe, closely related to the Ioway, Missouria, and Ho-Chunk.

== Name ==
The subchief was known as Shaumonekusse, Chonmonicase, Ietan, Letan, and L'Letan. Shúⁿmáñikathi in the Chiwere language means "Prairie Wolf." His name is also spelled Sų Manyi Kasisooⁿ, Sų Manyi Kathi, and Shųmanyikathi.

== Personal ==
Sų Manyi Kathi belonged to the Bear clan. Shaumonekusse was described as a witty and sociable person, and "a daring, active, and successful warrior. We are not aware of his having any hereditary claims to the chieftainship of his tribe, to which he has risen gradually by his own merits. He is a person of deep penetration, and is capable of acting with much duplicity on any occasion when he may consider it politic to conceal his real views."

== Career ==
"He recounted his deeds in 1819 during a dance performed before members of the Stephen Long Expedition to the Rocky Mountains. Later in life he killed his brother after a fight in which the latter bit off the end of his nose."

Shaumonekusse traveled with an American Indian delegation to Washington, DC in 1821 to meet with high-ranking officials, including President James Monroe. Of his five wives, he took the youngest, Eagle of Delight, with him to the American capital. Charles Bird King painted both of their portraits on that trip.
