= Chonos =

Chonos may refer to:

- Chonos tribe, a Mongolian tribe of Russia, Mongolia and China
- Chono people, an extinct culture of Chile
- Chonos Archipelago, in Chile
- Chonos Metamorphic Complex, in Chile
