= Otoe =

Native American people of the Midwestern United States

Jiwére
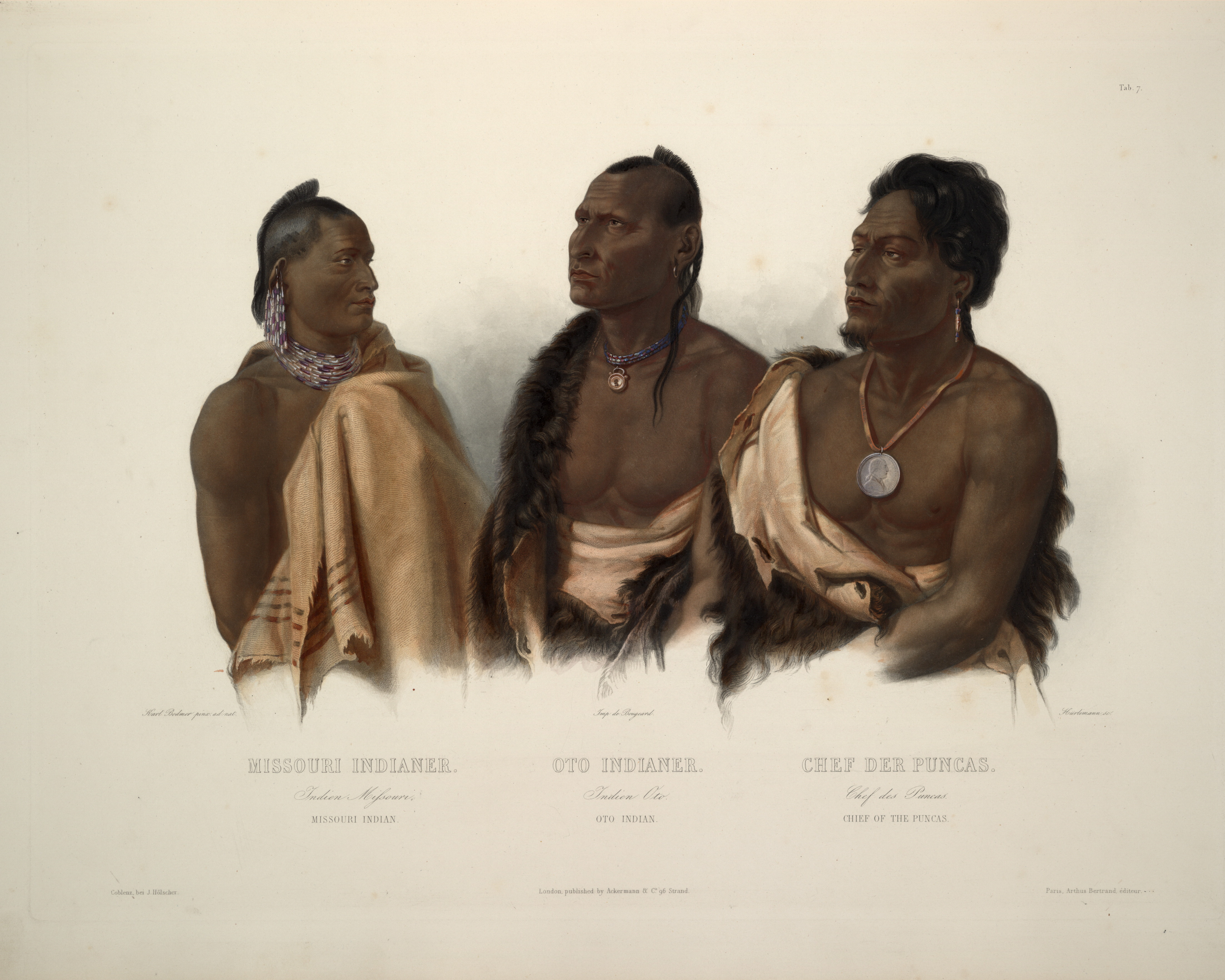
- Missouri Indian, Otoe Indian, and chief of the Ponca by Karl Bodmer, c. 1840–1843

Total population
- 4,655 enrolled members

Regions with significant populations
- United States (Oklahoma, formerly Nebraska)

Languages
- English, formerly Chiwere

Religion
- Native American Church, Christianity

Related ethnic groups
- Ioway, Missouria, Ho-Chunk, and Winnebago

- People: Jiwére
- Language: Jiwére ich'é, Hand Talk
- Country: Jiwére Máyaⁿ

The Otoe (Chiwere: Jiwére) are a Native American people of the Midwestern United States. The Otoe language, Chiwere, is part of the Siouan family and closely related to that of the related Iowa, Missouria, and Ho-Chunk tribes.

Historically, the Otoe tribe lived as a semi-nomadic people on the Central Plains along the bank of the Missouri River in Nebraska, Kansas, Iowa, and Missouri. They lived in elm-bark lodges while they farmed, and used tipis while traveling, like many other Plains tribes. They often left their villages to hunt buffalo.

In the early 19th century, many of their villages were destroyed due to warfare with other tribes. European-American encroachment and disease also played a role in their decline. Today, Otoe people belong to the federally recognized tribe, the Otoe-Missouria Tribe of Indians, headquartered in Red Rock, Oklahoma.

== History ==
The Otoe were once part of the Ho-Chunk and Siouan-speaking tribes of the Western Great Lakes and Upper Midwest. Around the 16th century, successive groups split off and migrated west and south. These became distinct tribes, the Otoe, the Missouria, and the Ioway. The Otoe settled in the lower Nemaha River valley. They adopted the horse culture and semi-nomadic lifestyle of the Great Plains, making the American bison central to their diet and culture.

=== European contact ===
When the Lewis and Clark Expedition headed up the Missouri River to explore the new territory the Otoe were the first tribe they encountered. They met at a place on the west bank of the Missouri River that would become known as the Council Bluff.

In the 1830s, European-American traders tried to influence tribal members through alcohol. As their dependence on alcohol grew, the men no longer hunted, but resorted to looting vacant Pawnee villages while the people were out hunting. Christian missionaries built a mission there.

In 1854 the Otoe-Missouria ceded most of their lands south of the Platte River in eastern Nebraska to the U.S. by treaty. They retained the Oto Reservation along the Big Blue River on the present Kansas-Nebraska border. They struggled to adapt to reservation life.

=== Move to Indian Territory ===
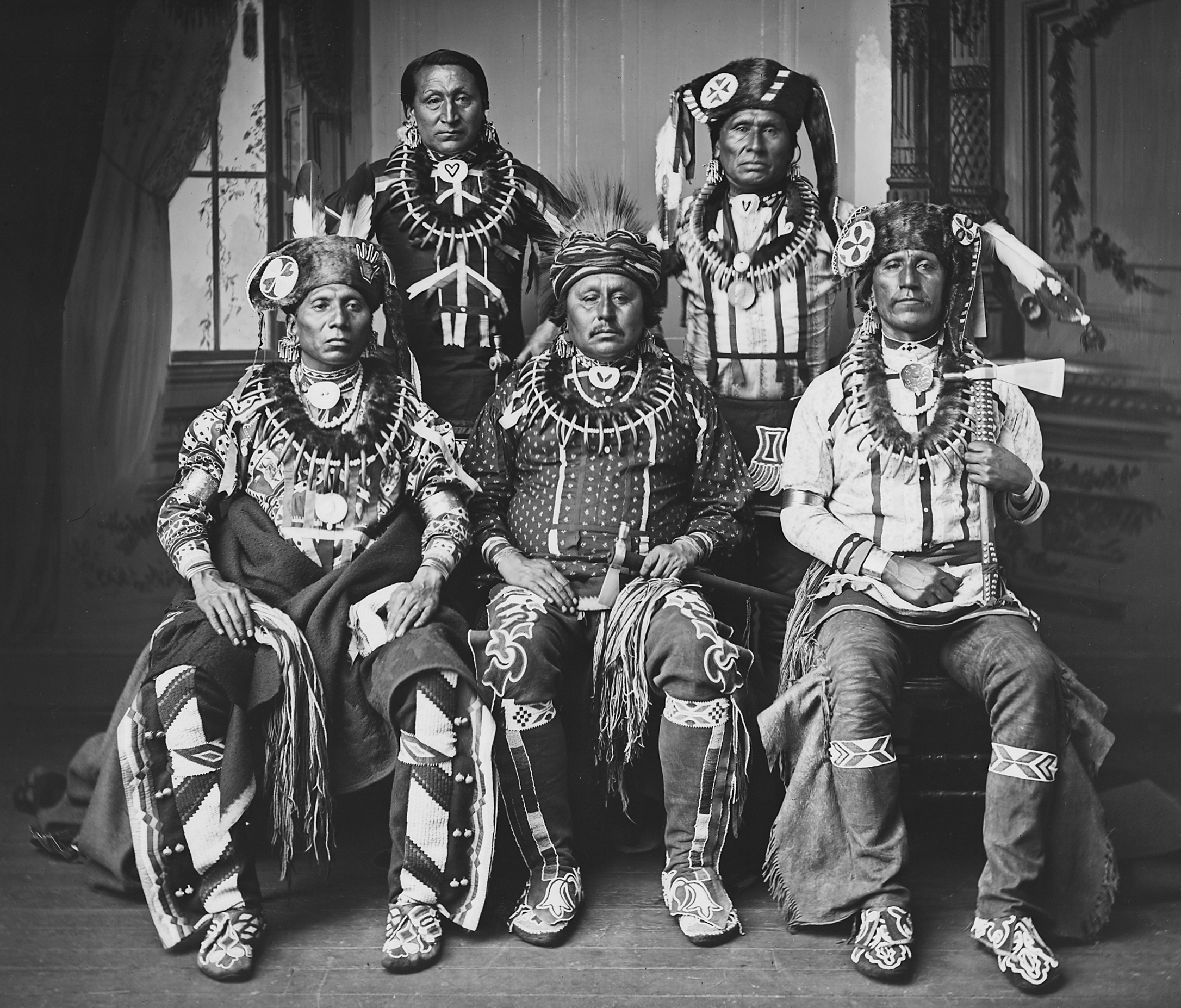
Otoe delegation, 1881. Photographer John K. Hillers

Otoe-Missouria Tribe Seal

During the 1870s, the tribe split into two factions. The Coyote band favored an immediate move to Indian Territory, where they believed they could better perpetuate their traditional tribal life outside the influence of the whites. The Quaker band favored remaining on the Big Blue River land. They were willing to sell the western half of the reservation to whites to gain income for a tribal annuity.

By the spring of 1880, about half the tribe had left the reservation and taken up residence with the Sac and Fox Nation in Indian Territory. By the next year, in response to dwindling prospects of self-sufficiency and continued pressure from white settlers, the remaining Otoe members in Nebraska sold the Big Blue reservation. They migrated to Oklahoma.

With the Otoe-Missouria already there, they purchased a new reservation in the Cherokee Outlet in the Indian Territory. This is in present-day Noble and Pawnee Counties, Oklahoma. Today the Otoe-Missouria Tribe of Indians is federally recognized. It is based in Red Rock, Oklahoma.

== Notable Otoe ==
- Annette Arkeketa, poet and playwright
- Carol Channing, actress
- Chono Ca Pe, early 19th-century leader
- Hayne Hudjihini, or Eagle of Delight (c. 1795–1822), wife of Sų Manyi Kathi
- Johny Hendricks, MMA fighter
- Tommy Morrison, former heavyweight boxer and co-star in Rocky V movie
- Sų Manyi Kathi, or Prairie Wolf (c. 1785–1837), sub-chief and diplomat
- Anna Lee Walters, author
- Della Warrior, director, New Mexico Museum of Indian Arts and Culture

== See also ==
- Fort Atkinson (Nebraska)
- Woodcliff Burials
